= Hypogymnia tenuispora =

Scientific classification
- Domain: Eukaryota
- Kingdom: Fungi
- Division: Ascomycota
- Class: Lecanoromycetes
- Order: Lecanorales
- Family: Parmeliaceae
- Genus: Hypogymnia
- Species: H. tenuispora

Binomial name
- Hypogymnia tenuispora McCune & Li S.Wang (2014)

Species of lichen

Hypogymnia tenuispora is a rare species of foliose lichen in the family Parmeliaceae. Found in China's Yunnan province, it is characterised by its uniquely narrow ascospores and crowded lobes, which help distinguish it from other similar Hypogymnia species.

== Taxonomy ==
Hypogymnia tenuispora was first described by lichenologists Bruce McCune and Li-Song Wang as a new species in 2014. The species epithet tenuispora is derived from the Latin words for thin and spore, indicating that the ascospores of this lichen are proportionately narrower than those of all other Hypogymnia species. The type specimen (holotype) was collected in September 2000 from a high plateau in Yunnan's Luquan County, specifically on Jiaozixue Mountain, north of Kunming.

== Description ==
The thallus, or vegetative body, of Hypogymnia tenuispora is appressed and can grow up to 7 cm (2.8 in) broad. It is made up of short, crowded lobes with a matte, brownish-tinged upper surface. The lobes have a height to width ratio ranging from 0.5:1 to 3:1 and often feature perforations at the tips and axils. The medulla, or inner tissue, is hollow, with the cavity ceiling being brownish to white and the floor being dark. This species lacks soredia and isidia, while lobules are rare.

Apothecia, or fruiting bodies, are common in this lichen and can grow up to 6–11 mm. The ascospores are narrowly elliptical, measuring 10.8–11.8 by 4.1–5.4 μm, and have a length to width ratio of about 2:1. This feature sets Hypogymnia tenuispora apart from other Hypogymnia species, which typically have spores shorter than 10 μm and a length to width ratio of 1.0:1 to 1.5:1.

=== Similar species ===
While Hypogymnia tenuispora shares some morphological characteristics with Hypogymnia bulbosa and Hypogymnia congesta, its spores are longer and narrower, and its lobe perforations are not typically rimmed. The other Hypogymnia species with spores longer than 10 μm, Hypogymnia macrospora and Hypogymnia pendula, have spores that are longer (12–17 μm), wider (9–14 μm), and feature a length to width ratio of typically 1.3:1. In the absence of spores, these species can be differentiated by examining the hypothecium of an apothecial section, which is POL+ (i.e., light in polarized light, indicating the presence of crystals) in Hypogymnia macrospora, while POL− (dark in polarized light) in Hypogymnia tenuispora and Hypogymnia pendula.

== Habitat and distribution ==
Hypogymnia tenuispora is known to grow on the bark of hardwood trees, such as Sorbus and Rhododendron. So far, this lichen has only been found in Yunnan province, where it is considered rare. Only two collections had been made at the time of publication, each showing considerable differences in outward appearance. The holotype specimen features darker thalli wrapped around twigs, while a second collection has larger, paler thalli that are appressed but not tightly wrapped around twigs.
