= Hypogymnia enteromorpha =

Scientific classification
- Kingdom: Fungi
- Division: Ascomycota
- Class: Lecanoromycetes
- Order: Lecanorales
- Family: Parmeliaceae
- Genus: Hypogymnia
- Species: H. enteromorpha

Binomial name
- Hypogymnia enteromorpha (Ach.) Nyl. (1900)

Synonyms
- List: Parmelia enteromorpha Ach. (1803); Lichen diatrypus * enteromorpha (Ach.) Lam. (1813); Parmelia physodes var. enteromorpha (Ach.) Tuck. (1848); Parmelia physodes f. enteromorpha (Ach.) Tuck. (1882); Parmelia physodes subsp. enteromorpha (Ach.) Nyl. (1888); Imbricaria physodes f. enteromorpha (Ach.) Arnold (1899); Imbricaria enteromorpha (Ach.) Jatta (1902); Menegazzia enteromorpha (Ach.) Gyeln. (1934)

Species of lichen-forming fungus

Hypogymnia enteromorpha, the budding tube lichen or gut lichen, is a species of foliose lichen in the family Parmeliaceae. It is most often found in moist conifer forests of western North America, where it grows on bark and weathered wood. The species forms pale grey, hollow lobes with a black underside and commonly develops small bud-like outgrowths along the margins. It is one of the larger and more conspicuous members of its genus, and is frequently identified with chemical spot tests in addition to its characteristic growth form.

== Taxonomy ==
The lichen was first formally described as a new species in 1803 by Erik Acharius, who named it Parmelia enteromorpha in his 1803 work Methodus qua omnes detectos lichenes. He set it apart from other "Parmelia" species by a combination of overall thallus form and underside coloration. He described a smooth, membranaceous thallus that is white above but black below, with crowded, overlapping lobes that are blunt at the tips and characteristically swollen or inflated. The apothecia were noted as brown and "very entire", i.e., with a neat, unbroken margin. Acharius also cited an earlier name, Lichen intestinalis D.J.E. Smith, indicating that he regarded Smith's concept as referring to the same lichen (or as part of the same circumscription). For locality, he gave "the western shores of boreal America" and credited Archibald Menzies as the collector.

William Nylander had already treated Acharius's Parmelia enteromorpha as part of the Parmelia physodes complex in his Synopsis methodica lichenum (1858–1860), writing that it represented the common form of P. physodes with unusually narrow lobe divisions. He later formalized that placement by publishing the infraspecific name Parmelia physodes subsp. enteromorpha in 1888, and in 1900 he transferred the taxon to Hypogymnia. In the same note he reported the species from Pidurutalagala (spelled "Pedrotallegalle" by Nylander) and noted it growing alongside Parmelia camtschadalis (now Xanthoparmelia camtschadalis).

Species Fungorum lists several additional names that have been applied to this lichen in the older literature, including infraspecific combinations under Parmelia physodes (as a variety, form, and subspecies) and transfers to other genera such as Lichen diatrypus, Imbricaria, and Menegazzia.

== Description ==
Hypogymnia enteromorpha is also known as the "budding tube lichen" and "gut lichen". It is a medium to large, foliose "tube lichen" with pale whitish-gray to pale greenish-gray lobes. The thallus is often about 5–15 cm (2–6 in) across, with individual lobes commonly about 2–6 mm (1/16–1/4 in) wide and sometimes reaching roughly 5–10 cm (2–4 in) in length. The lobes are inflated and hollow, and they may either drape from the substrate or sit pressed against it. On more level surfaces the lobes are often shorter and rounder, while on vertical faces they commonly elongate. Branching is irregular, and the branches may pass back and forth between constricted segments and swollen ones.

A cut lobe shows a dark inner lining to the hollow ("ceiling"), matching the generally dark interior. Many lobe ends broaden, and some finish in a small terminal opening. Small marginal outgrowths are often present, appearing as tiny round lobules or short bud-like side lobes that may be abundant or sparse on a given thallus. The underside is black, and it does not form soredia or isidia. Apothecia are frequently produced, and are typically brown. In chemical spot tests the medulla is reported as PD+ red (also described as P+ yellow turning red), K−, C−, and KC+ (pink to orange), consistent with protocetraric and physodic/physodalic chemistry alongside diffractaic acid.

== Similar species ==
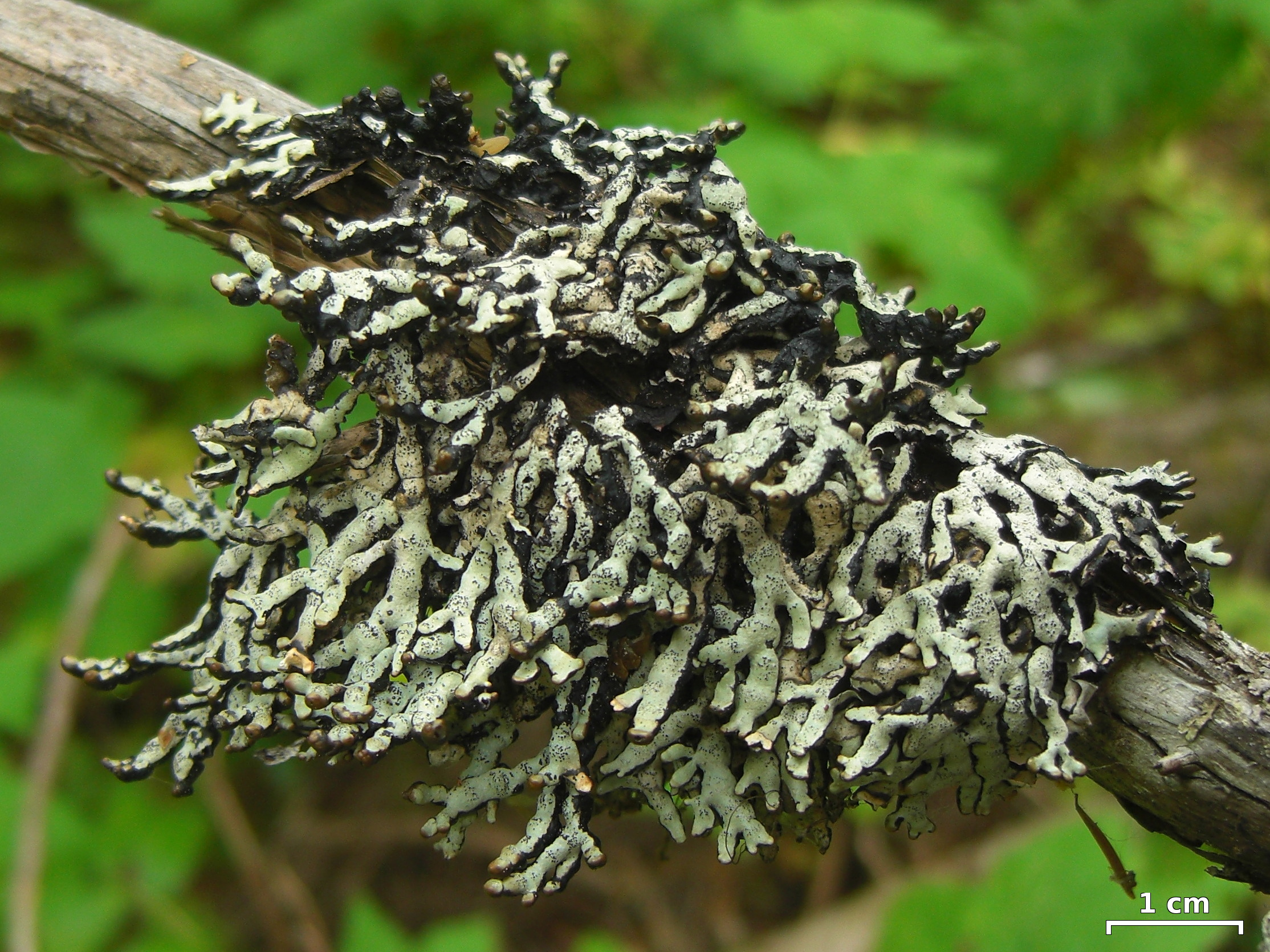
Hypogymnia apinnata is a lookalike species with a distribution similar to H. enteromorpha.

Several western North American Hypogymnia can resemble H. enteromorpha at a glance, especially other broad-lobed, hollow species with irregular branching. The most easily confused species is H. apinnata, but H. enteromorpha more often shows short, bud-like side lobes and tends to have marginal lobules, and it also differs chemically by being consistently P+ and KC+ rather than P− (or only pale yellowish) and KC−. In the Pacific Northwest, H. enteromorpha is described as the only member of the genus that combines broad lobes with a P+ reaction that turns red (P+R), which helps separate it from superficially similar species when spot tests are available.

Other look-alikes can be separated by growth form and a few structural features. H. imshaugii and its PD− counterpart H. inactiva tend to branch in a cleaner forked pattern and often grow with an upward-angled habit, especially on twigs, and H. imshaugii also differs in having a white medullary ceiling rather than a dark one. H. duplicata is typically narrower-lobed and hangs more loosely from the surface, with tips that often curve upward. Among PD− species with irregular branching, H. occidentalis has round lobules but is smaller and lacks the alternating constrictions seen in H. enteromorpha, while H. apinnata is described as lacking the small marginal lobules (and typically the bud-like side lobes). H. metaphysodes is usually more tightly flattened against the substrate than these species, and it often has somewhat concave or upturned lobe tips.

== Habitat and distribution ==
Hypogymnia enteromorpha grows on bark and wood, especially on conifers, and it may occur directly on conifer bark or across dry, weathered wood. It is associated with moist low- to mid-elevation forests, and it tolerates sites ranging from fairly exposed to more shaded situations on the bark or wood surface.

In western North America it is described as common and conspicuous in many areas, with a documented range extending from Alaska south to California. It is very common in the western Cascade Range, but becomes uncommon to rare eastward toward the Continental Divide.
