= Hypogymnia saxicola =

Scientific classification
- Domain: Eukaryota
- Kingdom: Fungi
- Division: Ascomycota
- Class: Lecanoromycetes
- Order: Lecanorales
- Family: Parmeliaceae
- Genus: Hypogymnia
- Species: H. saxicola

Binomial name
- Hypogymnia saxicola McCune & L.S.Wang (2014)

Species of lichen

Hypogymnia saxicola is a rare species of foliose lichen in the family Parmeliaceae. Found in Yunnan and Sichuan provinces of China, it forms delicate cushions on mossy rocks in subalpine regions. It is characterised by its slender, glossy brown lobes and unique chemistry.

== Taxonomy ==
Hypogymnia saxicola was formally described as a new species in 2014 by lichenologists Bruce McCune and Li-Song Wang. The type specimen was collected by the first author from Jiaozixue Mountain, Luquan County, Yunnan, at an altitude of 4,200 m (13,800 ft), where it was found growing among subalpine Rhododendron and Juniperus scrub. The species epithet saxicola highlights the species' unusual preference for rocky substrates, which is an uncommon preference among Hypogymnia lichens.

== Description ==
The thallus of Hypogymnia saxicola forms fragile, papery cushions up to 10 cm (4 in) wide, with lobes that are typically 0.5–1.4 mm wide. The lobes are smooth and glossy, with colours ranging from pale greenish-grey to dark brown. The lichen has dark cavities on its lower surface and lacks soredia and isidia, which are reproductive structures (propagules) commonly found in other lichens. Hypogymnia saxicola reproduces through fragmentation, a process similar to that of H. fragillima and H. duplicata. Its open branching and fragile lobes facilitate this mode of reproduction.

=== Similar species ===
Hypogymnia saxicola is similar in appearance to H. irregularis and H. vittata, but can be distinguished by its more fragile texture, dark brown lobe tips, and absence of pycnidia and apothecia. Unlike H. irregularis, the perforations on the lower surface of H. saxicola are sparse and mostly centred.

The brown colour of H. saxicola distinguishes it from the white to pale greenish-grey lobes of H. fragillima and H. duplicata. Additionally, H. saxicola can be differentiated from these species by its unique chemistry, as it lacks the P+ chemical reaction and nodulose (alternating pinched and swollen) lobes found in H. duplicata.

== Habitat and distribution ==
This species grows on rocks and moss in subalpine environments, typically at elevations between 3,500 and 4,200 m (11,500 and 13,800 ft). Hypogymnia saxicola is found on mossy boulders and outcrops in Rhododendron-Juniperus shrubland and open slopes with dwarf bamboo. At the time of publication, it had only been found in Yunnan and Sichuan Provinces in China.
