= Hypogymnia canadensis =

Scientific classification
- Kingdom: Fungi
- Division: Ascomycota
- Class: Lecanoromycetes
- Order: Lecanorales
- Family: Parmeliaceae
- Genus: Hypogymnia
- Species: H. canadensis

Binomial name
- Hypogymnia canadensis Goward & McCune (2007)
- Holotype: Kispiox Valley, Canada

Species of lichen

Hypogymnia canadensis is a species of corticolous (bark-dwelling), foliose lichen in the family Parmeliaceae. Found in western North America, it was formally described as a new species in 2007. Although Hypogymnia canadensi shares its habitat with several related species, it can be reliably identified through a combination of its morphological traits—such as narrower lobe width and smoother upper surface—and its unique chemical composition.

== Taxonomy ==
Hypogymnia canadensis was formally described as a new species in 2007 by the lichenologists Trevor Goward and Bruce McCune. The type specimen was collected 36 km (22 mi) north-northwest of Kispiox, British Columbia, at an elevation of 750 m (2,460 ft). The habitat is characterised as an interior cedar-hemlock zone or lower oroboreal subzone, situated at the lower end of a slope in a wet and open area of a swamp that had been disturbed or damaged. The area is an old-growth forest with Abies amabilis and Tsuga heterophylla as the predominant trees. The lichen, collected by Goward, was found growing on a Tsuga branch on 23 June 1996.

== Description ==
Hypogymnia canadensis is a corticolous lichen, meaning it predominantly grows on tree bark. The thallus is appressed and can reach over 6 cm (2.4 in) in diameter, with a cartilaginous texture. The branching pattern ranges from isotomic (equal branching) to irregularly dichotomous, with occasional short, bud-like lobes. The upper surface is whitish to pale greenish-grey or brownish, smooth to weakly rugose (wrinkled), with minimal or sparse dark mottling. A black border (a prothallus) may sometimes be visible.

The lobes that make up the thallus of Hypogymnia canadensis are contiguous to separate, soon becoming imbricate (overlapping like shingles). They have an even profile, are not intestiniform (not resembling intestines), and are 0.4 to 2.0 mm broad, with a width-to-height ratio of 1–2:1. The lobe tips are imperforate (solid). The lower surface of the lichen is also imperforate and black, with a heavily rugose texture. The inner layer, or medulla, is hollow, with the cavity ceiling ranging from pale brown to dark brown and the cavity floor from brown to dark brown, noticeable at least 5 mm back from the lobe tip. This lichen lacks asexual propagules.

Apothecia (fruiting bodies) are fairly common in Hypogymnia canadensis. They are somewhat stipitate (having a short stalk) and can reach up to 6 mm in diameter. The receptacle is mainly funnel-shaped, with the stipe (stalk) being hollow or filled with white cottony hyphae. The disc of the apothecia ranges from tan to dark brown. The exterior of the thalline exciple (the outer layer of the apothecium) is pruinose, covered with a loose mass of hyphae heavily encrusted with crystals. The spores are nearly spherical to broadly ellipsoid, measuring 4.5–7.5 by 4.7–5.5 μm.

Pycnidia, which are structures that produce conidia (asexual spores), are common and form black spots on the upper cortex. The conidia are rod-shaped to weakly bifusiform (spindle-shaped), measuring 3–5 by 0.4–0.6 μm.

== Chemistry ==
In Hypogymnia canadensis, various spot tests reveal distinct chemical reactions. The cortex shows a P+ (pale yellow) and K+ (yellow) reaction, while showing no reaction to C and KC−. The medulla, on the other hand, reacts with K+ (slowly turning reddish brown), KC+ (orange-red), but does not react to P or C.

Thin-layer chromatography has identified the presence of several lichen substances in Hypogymnia canadensis. These include atranorin, physodic acid, and 3-hydroxyphysodic acid. The K+ (reddish-brown) reaction specifically associated with 3-hydroxyphysodic acid is noteworthy. As described by McCune and colleagues (2006), this colour change first appears through cracks in the cortex, followed by a gradual reddening of the medulla, visible through the translucent upper cortex.

== Similar species ==
Hypogymnia canadensis can be distinguished from other species within the genus Hypogymnia by its distinct morphological and chemical characteristics. One similar species is Hypogymnia wilfiana, which shares some overlapping habitat preferences. However, H. wilfiana is characterised by a broader lobe width of 1.0–3.0 mm, compared to the narrower 0.4–2.0 mm lobes of H. canadensis. Furthermore, H. wilfiana has a more consistently blackened lower surface with a broader and more conspicuous black border on the upper surface, whereas the black border in H. canadensis is either absent or less pronounced.

Another species, Hypogymnia recurva, also exhibits differences that help in distinguishing it from H. canadensis. H. recurva features recurved lobe tips, a trait not observed in H. canadensis. Additionally, H. recurva has a thicker thallus and the upper surface tends to be more rugose compared to the relatively smoother surface of H. canadensis.

Both H. wilfiana and H. recurva have distinct chemical compositions that further differentiate them from H. canadensis. H. canadensis contains atranorin, physodic acid, and 3-hydroxyphysodic acid as constant lichen substances, whereas the chemical profiles of H. wilfiana and H. recurva include other secondary metabolites that can be detected through thin-layer chromatography.

== Habitat and distribution ==
Hypogymnia canadensis is found in the cool, moist conifer forests of the coastal mountains in western North America. Its range extends from southeastern Alaska to northern Oregon, reaching inland to southeastern British Columbia. In the southern part of its range, it is relatively rare and typically absent from lower elevations. In Oregon, it is found at elevations between 730 and 1,400 m (2,400 and 4,590 ft), whereas in coastal Alaska, it can be found near sea level. Since its original publication in 2007, the lichen has been documented from several locations across coastal southern Alaska, typical growing on conifers and Betula.

The habitats occupied by H. canadensis experience cool, wet winters, often with substantial snowfall, and mild, relatively dry summers.
