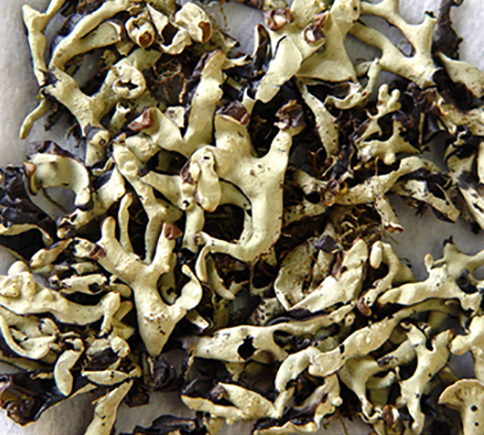
- Image of holotype specimen

Scientific classification
- Kingdom: Fungi
- Division: Ascomycota
- Class: Lecanoromycetes
- Order: Lecanorales
- Family: Parmeliaceae
- Genus: Hypogymnia
- Species: H. flavida

Binomial name
- Hypogymnia flavida McCune & Obermayer (2001)

= Hypogymnia flavida =

Species of lichen

Hypogymnia flavida is a species of foliose lichen in the family Parmeliaceae. It is found in mountainous locations of east Asia, where it grows on the bark and wood of woody plants. It has a relatively large yellowish thallus.

== Taxonomy ==
Hypogymnia flavida was described as a new species in 2001 by lichenologists Bruce McCune and Walter Obermayer. The type specimen was collected from the Jiaozi Snow Mountain north of Kunming, at an altitude of 3,700 m (12,100 ft). Here it was found growing on a fir tree.

== Description ==
The lichen has a foliose (leafy) pale yellowish-green thallus up to 20 cm (8 in) broad. Soredia, isidia, and lobules are absent from the thallus surface. Apothecia are common; they have a reddish-brown disc in an urn-shaped receptacle, and measure up to 17 mm (0.67 in) in diameter. The ascospores are more or less spherical, measuring 5.5 by 5.0 μm. Pycnidia are also common; the pycnidiospores are cylindrical, with dimensions of 5.5–5.0 long by 0.5–0.8 μm thick. The expected results of chemical spot tests are: cortex P−, C−, KC+ (yellow); medulla P+ (orange-red), K−, C−, KC−. It contains the secondary compounds usnic acid and physodalic acid as major components, and protocetraric acid as a minor component.

Hypogymnia hypotrypa is morphologically and chemically similar to Hypogymnia flavida, but it lacks apothecia and instead has soredia. These two species are one of three fertile/sorediate species pairs in genus Hypogymnia. H. hypotrypa has a wider range and greater altitudinal distribution, as it is found in locales at altitudes between 65–4,300 m (213–14,100 ft) height, compared with 2,150–4,300 m (7,050–14,100 ft) for H. flavida.

== Habitat and distribution ==
Hypogymnia flavida frequently occurs on both the bark and wood of conifers as well as Rhododendron, but it also occurs less frequently on hardwoods, such as oak. In China, it has been recorded from Sichuan, Tibet, and Yunnan. It also occurs in Nepal and Taiwan.
