= Hypogymnia capitata =

Scientific classification
- Domain: Eukaryota
- Kingdom: Fungi
- Division: Ascomycota
- Class: Lecanoromycetes
- Order: Lecanorales
- Family: Parmeliaceae
- Genus: Hypogymnia
- Species: H. capitata

Binomial name
- Hypogymnia capitata McCune (2014)

Species of lichen

Hypogymnia capitata is a species of foliose lichen in the family Parmeliaceae. Found in high-elevation conifer forests in Sichuan Province, China, it was described as a new species in 2014. The lichen is characterized by its capitate terminal soralia (i.e., asexual propagules with rounded or club-shaped ends), brownish lobes with white cavities, and the presence of olivetoric acid. This lichen is distinguished from similar species by its specific morphological, chemical, and habitat characteristics.

== Taxonomy ==
Hypogymnia capitata was first scientifically described by lichenologist Bruce McCune in 2014. The species name capitata originates from the Latin word capitatus, which refers to the capitate terminal soralia. The type specimen was found in the Upper Yalong basin, Cho La (Sichuan, at an altitude of 4,730 m (15,520 ft).

== Description ==
Hypogymnia capitata features an appressed to pendulous (hanging) thallus, measuring up to 4 cm (1.6 in) or more in width. The thallus has a cartilaginous texture with variable branching patterns. The upper surface of the lobes is pale greenish-grey to brown and exhibits dark mottling. Lobes have a width-to-height ratio of 1:1 to 8:1 and are sparsely perforated on the lower surface. The medulla is hollow, with white ceilings and white to greyish floors.

The lichen produces powdery soredia in terminal capitate soralia. Apothecia are not observed, but brown to black pycnidia are common. The spermatia are cylindrical and may have slight swellings at one end or slightly off-centre.

=== Similar species ===
Hypogymnia capitata is similar to Hypogymnia submundata, H. tubulosa, and H. bitteri, which also produce terminal soralia. However, it can be distinguished by its more variable branching, black mottling on the upper surface, and sparse perforations in the lower surface. Additionally, the presence of olivetoric acid and absence of physodic acid set it apart chemically from the other species.

== Chemistry ==
Hypogymnia capitata is characterized by the presence of atranorin and olivetoric acid, with accessory physodalic and protocetraric acids. The species is unique within the genus for its absence of physodic acid and the presence of olivetoric acid. The cortex and medulla exhibit various colour reactions when tested with different reagents, helping to differentiate this species from lookalikes.

== Habitat and distribution ==
This lichen is known to inhabit high-elevation conifer forests in Sichuan Province, China. One known occurrence was in a streamside conifer forest. Due to the limited number of known sites, its specific habitat requirements are not well understood.
