= Hypogymnia nitida =

Scientific classification
- Domain: Eukaryota
- Kingdom: Fungi
- Division: Ascomycota
- Class: Lecanoromycetes
- Order: Lecanorales
- Family: Parmeliaceae
- Genus: Hypogymnia
- Species: H. nitida

Binomial name
- Hypogymnia nitida McCune & Li S.Wang (2014)

Species of lichen

Hypogymnia nitida is a species of foliose lichen in the family Parmeliaceae. It has a glossy dark brown upper surface and a strongly wrinkled, convoluted lower surface. Found in China, it was described as a new species in 2014.

== Taxonomy ==
Hypogymnia nitida was first scientifically described by Bruce McCune and Li-Song Wang in China in a 2014 publication. The species epithet nitida was chosen to highlight the lichen's glossy upper surface. The type specimen was collected in Yunnan province, China, at Bei Ma Xue Shan in Dêqên County, at an elevation of 4,200 m (13,800 ft).

== Description ==
The Hypogymnia nitida thallus is appressed to imbricate or somewhat pendant and can grow up to 7–10 cm (2.8–3.9 in) in length. The upper surface is smooth or rugose, glossy, and brown to dark brown, occasionally with black mottling. The lower surface is black, except for the brown lobe tips, and features strong wrinkles and convolutions. The lobes are hollow, imperforate, and cartilaginous in texture, typically measuring 0.5–2 mm in width.

Apothecia occur occasionally in this species; they are somewhat to fully stipitate, and can reach 5–10 mm (0.2–0.4 in) in diameter. The lichen's spores are ellipsoid, measuring 6.3–7.7 by 4.4–5.3 μm. The secondary chemistry of Hypogymnia nitida includes several lichen products: atranorin, physodic acid, 2'-O-methylphysodic acid, and vittatolic acid. The expected results of standard chemical spot tests on this lichen are: cortex K+ (yellow), P+ (pale yellow), C−, KC− (except the pink-orange reaction of the medulla showing through); medulla K−, C−, KC+ (orange red), P−.

=== Similar species ===
Hypogymnia nitida may be related to H. delavayi and H. stricta. However, its glossy brown upper surface, imperforate lobes, and absence of 3-hydroxyphysodic acid set it apart from these species. Hypogymnia nitida also shares similarities with H. austerodes, which also has shiny, brown, often appressed lobes and lacks perforations. However, Hypogymnia austerodes and its close relative H. bitteri are sorediate and do not typically develop separate lobes or become somewhat pendant. The circumboreal species H. subobscura is similar in its brown colouration but differs from H. nitida by having frequent, small perforations in the lobe tips.

== Habitat and distribution ==
Hypogymnia nitida is primarily found on conifers, such as larch and spruce, in the Hengduan Mountains area of northwest Yunnan Province and southwest Sichuan Province in China. The species inhabits conifer forests at elevations ranging from 3,700–4,200 m (12,100–13,800 ft).
