= Hypogymnia papilliformis =

Scientific classification
- Domain: Eukaryota
- Kingdom: Fungi
- Division: Ascomycota
- Class: Lecanoromycetes
- Order: Lecanorales
- Family: Parmeliaceae
- Genus: Hypogymnia
- Species: H. papilliformis

Binomial name
- Hypogymnia papilliformis McCune, Tchaban. & X.L.Wei (2015)

Species of lichen

Hypogymnia papilliformis is a rare species of foliose lichen in the family Parmeliaceae. Found in China and the Russian Far East, it was formally described as a new species in 2015 by Bruce McCune, Svetlana Tchabanenko, and Xin Li Wei. The type specimen was collected by the second author in the Lazovsky Nature Reserve (Primorsky Krai, Russia) at an altitude of 600 m (2,000 ft); here, in a mixed conifer–broadleaved forest, it was found growing on Korean pine (Pinus koraiensis). The lichen has also been recorded from a mixed forest in the mountains of Shaanxi Province in China, at an altitude of 1,500 m (4,900 ft). The specific epithet papilliformis alludes to the papillose texture (i.e., covered with pimple-like structures) of the upper thallus surface. Secondary compounds that occur in Hypogymnia papilliformis include atranorin, and physodic acid as major metabolites, and minor amounts of 2'-O-methylphysodic acid and vittatolic acid.
