= Hypogymnia laxa =

Scientific classification
- Domain: Eukaryota
- Kingdom: Fungi
- Division: Ascomycota
- Class: Lecanoromycetes
- Order: Lecanorales
- Family: Parmeliaceae
- Genus: Hypogymnia
- Species: H. laxa

Binomial name
- Hypogymnia laxa McCune (2003)

Species of lichen in the family Parmeliaceae

Hypogymnia laxa is a species of foliose lichen in the family Parmeliaceae. Found in the Chinese Himalayas, it was described as a new species by Bruce McCune in 2003. The type specimen was collected from the Jiaozi Snow Mountain in Luquan County (Yunnan), at an elevation of 3,750 metres (12,300 ft). Here it was found growing on the bark and wood of Abies, Pinus, and Rhododendron. The lichen is characterized by a thallus with soredia, the presence of physodalic acid in the medulla, and rimmed holes on the lower surface. This latter feature distinguishes it from the morphologically similar Hypogymnia pseudophysodes, which always has unrimmed holes.
