= Hypogymnia diffractaica =

Scientific classification
- Domain: Eukaryota
- Kingdom: Fungi
- Division: Ascomycota
- Class: Lecanoromycetes
- Order: Lecanorales
- Family: Parmeliaceae
- Genus: Hypogymnia
- Species: H. diffractaica

Binomial name
- Hypogymnia diffractaica McCune (2003)

Species of lichen in the family Parmeliaceae

Hypogymnia diffractaica is a species of foliose lichen in the family Parmeliaceae. Initially reported from Southwest China, it was described as a new species by Bruce McCune in 2003. The type specimen was collected in Jiulong County (Sichuan Province), at an elevation of 3,000 metres (9,800 ft). Here it was found growing on the bark and wood of Rhododendron; it has also been recorded on birch. It is characterized by its slender lobes, the rimmed holes on the lower surface, and the presence of the chemical diffractaic acid as the main secondary metabolite in the medulla. It has a lower surface that is expanded and puffed out. Hypogymnia hengduanensis, the only other Hypogymnia species containing diffractaic acid as the main medullary substance, is quite similar in appearance, but can be distinguished from H. diffractaica by the presence of isidia. It also tends to grow at slightly lower elevations. In 2018, H. diffractaica was recorded from Bhutan.
