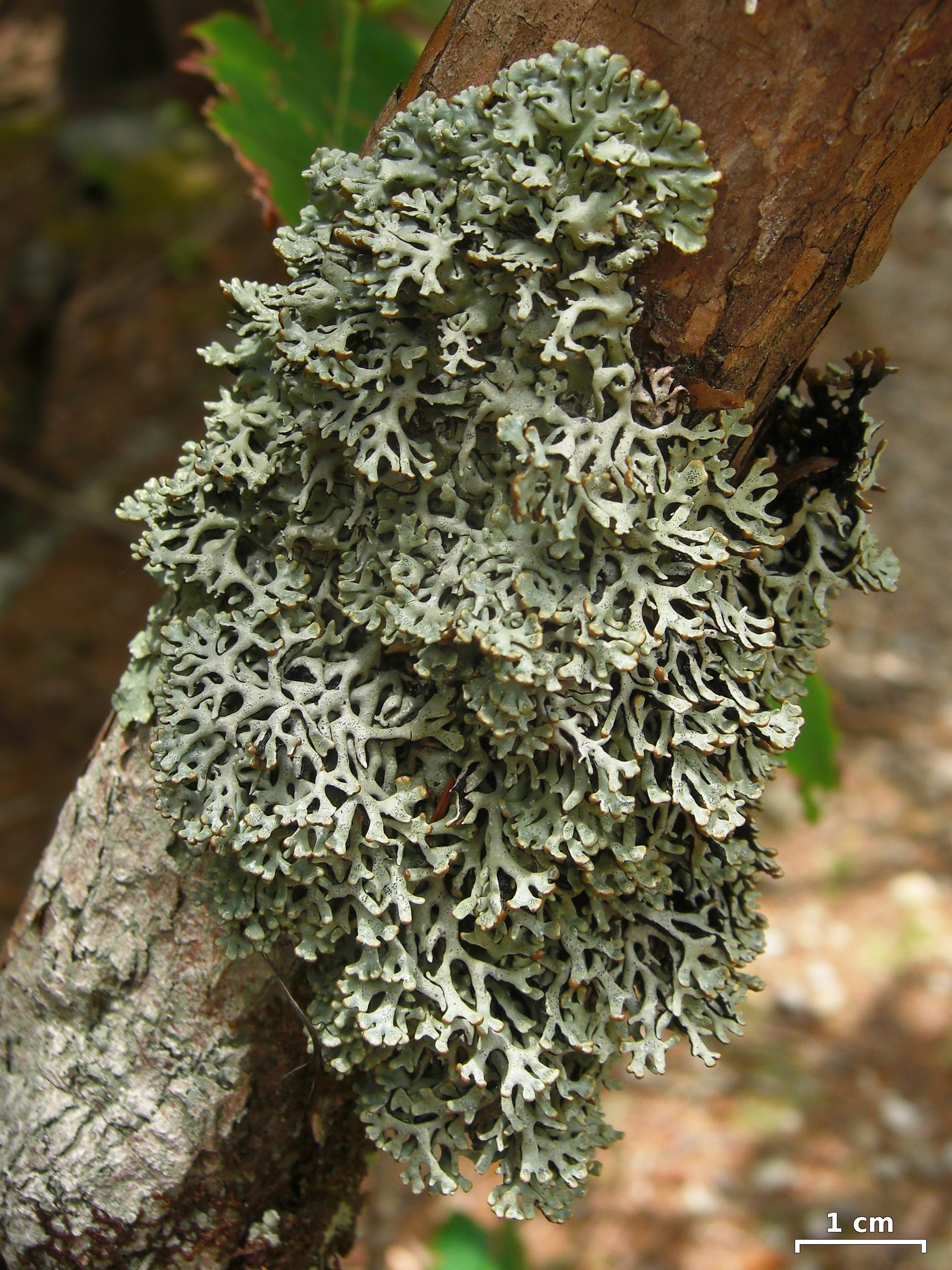

Conservation status
- Secure (NatureServe)

Scientific classification
- Kingdom: Fungi
- Division: Ascomycota
- Class: Lecanoromycetes
- Order: Lecanorales
- Family: Parmeliaceae
- Genus: Hypogymnia
- Species: H. krogiae

Binomial name
- Hypogymnia krogiae Ohlsson (1973)

= Hypogymnia krogiae =

Species of lichen

Hypogymnia krogiae, commonly known as the freckled tube lichen, is a species of foliose lichen in the family Parmeliaceae. Found in North America, it was described as a new species in 1973 by Karl Ohlsson. The type specimen was collected near Cheat Bridge, West Virginia by Mason Hale in 1956.

== Description ==
The lichen has a greenish-gray thallus measuring up to 8 cm (3 in) in diameter. The thallus comprises individual overlapping lobes that are 0.8–2.5 mm (0.03–0.10 in) wide, with slightly upturned edges on the marginal lobes. The thallus undersurface is dark brown to black and wrinkled, but becoming lighter-colored near the lobe tips. Apothecia (sexual fruiting bodies) are common on the thallus surface; they are on a small stalk (stipitate), have a brown disc and are 2.0–3.0 mm wide. The ascospores number 8 per ascus and measure 4.0–6.0 μm. Hypogymnia krogiae contains the secondary compounds atranorin, chloroatranorin, physodic acid, physodalic acid, and trace amounts of protocetraric acid. The expected results for standard chemical spot tests on the medulla are PD+ (red), K−, KC+ (pink), and C−.

Hypogymnia krogiae reproduces by sexual means (via the apothecia) and does not have any soredia. It has a sorediate counterpart, Hypogymnia incurvoides, which is also found in North America. This pair is one of three such fertile/sorediate species pairs in the genus Hypogymnia.

== Habitat and distribution ==
Hypogymnia krogiae occurs in eastern North America from Tennessee and North Carolina, north to Quebec in Canada. It is a corticolous lichen, and grows on fir and spruce trees in both open and shaded forests.
