= Hypogymnia amplexa =

Scientific classification
- Kingdom: Fungi
- Division: Ascomycota
- Class: Lecanoromycetes
- Order: Lecanorales
- Family: Parmeliaceae
- Genus: Hypogymnia
- Species: H. amplexa

Binomial name
- Hypogymnia amplexa Goward, Björk & T.B.Wheeler (2011)
- Holotype site: Spokane, Washington

Species of lichen

Hypogymnia amplexa is a species of corticolous (bark-dwelling), foliose lichen in the family Parmeliaceae. It is found in the western United States and Canada.

== Taxonomy ==
The lichen was described as new to science in 2011 by the lichenologists Trevor Goward, Curtis Björk, and Timothy Wheeler. The type specimen was collected by the second author from Riverside State Park in Spokane, Washington, where it was found growing on the branches of a Pinus ponderosa tree. The species name amplexa is derived from the Latin word for "embracing" or "clasping", alluding to the unique characteristic of the lichen's peripheral lobes, which have a tendency to curl around and enclose the twig or branch they grow on.

== Description ==
Hypogymnia amplexa is a foliose lichen that typically spreads up to 6–8 cm (2.4–3.1 in), although occasionally up to 10 cm (4 in) across. Its structure is corticate, meaning it has a cortex, both above and below. One of its defining features is its hollow lobes, which typically have two distinct morphological types: peripheral and central. The peripheral lobes are short, often as broad as they are long, and tend to be nearly or completely contiguous. They generally flare outward towards their rounded tips and sometimes wrap around the supporting branch. These lobes are usually between 2–3 mm wide, but can sometimes extend up to 4 mm. Small subapical perforations are often present over the upper surface, and occasionally at the lobe tips.

In contrast, the central lobes are less dense, more elongated, and tend to be partly ascending. Initially, their branching is isotomic dichotomous, meaning they branch symmetrically, but later this becomes predominantly anisotomic, resulting in more asymmetrical branching with rather pointed tips. The broadest of these central lobes are between 1.5 and 2.5 mm wide, and occasionally have small lateral or axillary perforations, especially near the margin of the lower surface.

The upper surface of the thallus is typically whitish or pale pastel green, with a dull appearance that can become brownish when exposed. It does not show black mottling and is generally rugose (wrinkled), often becoming cerebriform (resembling a brain's surface) towards the centre of the thallus. The medullary ceiling is predominantly white but may show weak brown discolouration near ruptures in the lower surface.

The lower surface of Hypogymnia amplexa is black, thin, easily torn, and sharply wrinkled or folded. It lacks rhizines, which are root-like structures found in some lichens. This species does not produce soredia or isidia, which are propagules of asexual reproduction.

The photobiont, the photosynthesizing component of the lichen, is trebouxioid. The apothecia (fruiting bodies) are laminal (occurring on the lamina of the thallus), ranging from sparse to numerous. They are stalked, with pale, often scabrid stalks, and the excipulum (the rim of the fruiting body) is not much expanded and often incurled at the rim. The disk is brown, and the largest apothecia are deeply cup-shaped, measuring between 2 and 8 mm across. The ascospores are ellipsoid, averaging 6.8 to 9.0 μm in length and 4.8 to 7.0 μm in width.

Pycnidia, the asexual reproductive structures, are copious over the upper surface, appearing as tiny black dots. The conidia, or asexual spores, measure approximately 6.5 to 8.0 μm in length and 1 μm in width.

Chemically, Hypogymnia amplexa contains atranorin and physodic acid as major and constant components, along with an occasionally present unknown compound. The cortex reacts to a solution of potassium hydroxide (K+) by turning yellow, while the medulla shows a sudden pink coloration when exposed to potassium chloride (KC+).

== Habitat and distribution ==
Hypogymnia amplexa is predominantly found in western intermontane regions of North America, with its presence primarily noted in eastern Washington, north and central Idaho, and western Montana. It also extends, albeit rarely, into southern intermontane areas of British Columbia. The species is most commonly found growing on the branches of Pinus ponderosa, though it has also been observed on Abies lasiocarpa, Artemisia tridentata, Pinus albicaulis, and Pseudotsuga menziesii. It tends to favor well-lit environments and is often the most prevalent Hypogymnia species in certain areas of eastern Washington and neighboring Idaho. In these regions, it can be a dominant macrolichen, especially on conifer branches in open, dry forests.
