= Hypogymnia pseudocyphellata =

Scientific classification
- Domain: Eukaryota
- Kingdom: Fungi
- Division: Ascomycota
- Class: Lecanoromycetes
- Order: Lecanorales
- Family: Parmeliaceae
- Genus: Hypogymnia
- Species: H. pseudocyphellata

Binomial name
- Hypogymnia pseudocyphellata McCune & E.P.Martin (2003)

Species of lichen in the family Parmeliaceae

Hypogymnia pseudocyphellata is a rare species of foliose lichen in the family Parmeliaceae. Found only in the Chinese Himalayas, it was described as a new species by Bruce McCune and Erin Martin in 2003. The type specimen was collected from the Tian Chi alpine lake in Shangri-La City (Yunnan), at an elevation of 3,750 metres (12,300 ft). Here it was found growing on the bark and wood of fir. The lichen is characterized by the presence of whitish pseudocyphellae on the tips of the lobes (unusual for the genus Hypogymnia); rimmed holes; lobes that are narrow and separated; and a complex secondary chemistry with several unknown chemical compounds as well as barbatic acid, but without diffractaic acid.
