= Hypogymnia congesta =

Scientific classification
- Kingdom: Fungi
- Division: Ascomycota
- Class: Lecanoromycetes
- Order: Lecanorales
- Family: Parmeliaceae
- Genus: Hypogymnia
- Species: H. congesta

Binomial name
- Hypogymnia congesta McCune & C.F.Culb. (2003)

Species of lichen

Hypogymnia congesta is a rare species of foliose lichen in the family Parmeliaceae. Found in China, it was formally described as a new species in 2003. The lichen grows on the bark and wood of conifers and bamboo. Hypogymnia congesta has a brown to brownish-grey foliose thallus measuring up to 8 cm (3.1 in) long or broad, with a cartilage-like texture. The lichen is chemically distinct, containing physodic acid and virensic acid; the latter substance is otherwise unknown from genus Hypogymnia.

== Taxonomy ==
Hypogymnia congesta was first formally described by lichenologists Bruce McCune and Chicita F. Culberson in 2003. The type specimen was collected near Wei Den village, behind Lou Ma Deng Mountain in Wei Xi County (Yunnan province) at an elevation of 3,000 m (9,800 ft).

== Description ==
The thallus of Hypogymnia congest is appressed to somewhat erect and can reach up to 8 cm (3.1 in) in width or length. It has a cartilaginous texture with variable branching patterns, and the lobes are typically 1.7–3.5 mm wide. The upper surface is smooth to weakly rugose and varies in colour from brown to brownish-grey. The lobes often have a pinched and swollen outline, with perforated tips and axils.

This lichen species lacks soredia and isidia, but often has lobules. Apothecia are common, measuring up to 6 mm in diameter. The ascospores are 7.0–8.0 by 5.0–5.5 μm in size, and pycnidia are also common. Spermatia are rod-shaped to weakly bifusiform, with dimensions of 5.0–6.0 by 0.8–1.1 μm.

== Chemistry ==
Hypogymnia congesta is unique within its genus for containing virensic acid as a major constituent. Virensic acid produces pale violet-gray spots in thin-layer chromatography, with specific retardation factor (Rf) values that help identify this unique chemical constituent. Other chemical components include atranorin and physodic acid. The cortex and medulla exhibit various colour reactions when tested with different reagents, providing another means to differentiate this species from others. Specifically, in the cortex they are K+ (yellow), C−, KC−, P+ (pale yellow); and in the medulla they are K−, C−, KC−, P+ (slowly yellow orange, often weak).

== Habitat and distribution ==
This lichen species is known to occur only in the type locality.
