= Hypogymnia irregularis =

Scientific classification
- Domain: Eukaryota
- Kingdom: Fungi
- Division: Ascomycota
- Class: Lecanoromycetes
- Order: Lecanorales
- Family: Parmeliaceae
- Genus: Hypogymnia
- Species: H. irregularis

Binomial name
- Hypogymnia irregularis McCune (2011)

Species of lichen

Hypogymnia irregularis is a species of corticolous (bark-dwelling) and lignicolous (wood-dwelling), foliose lichen in the family Parmeliaceae. Found in Asia, it was formally described as a new species in 2011 by lichenologist Bruce McCune. The type specimen was collected by the author from Jiaoxi Mountain (north of Kunming, Yunnan) at an altitude of 3,700 m (12,100 ft), where it was found growing on the bark of Abies. It has since been recorded growing on the wood and bark of both conifers (including Picea, Pinus, Tsuga) and hardwood trees (including Rhododendron, Quercus, Sorbus, and dwarf bamboo). In addition to southwest China (Yunnan and Sichuan), where it is most common, it has also been collected from India, Nepal, Tibet, and Taiwan. The species epithet alludes to the irregular positioning of perforations on the lower surface of the thallus.
