= Hypogymnia pruinoidea =

Scientific classification
- Domain: Eukaryota
- Kingdom: Fungi
- Division: Ascomycota
- Class: Lecanoromycetes
- Order: Lecanorales
- Family: Parmeliaceae
- Genus: Hypogymnia
- Species: H. pruinoidea

Binomial name
- Hypogymnia pruinoidea X.L.Wei & J.C.Wei (2012)

Species of lichen

Hypogymnia pruinoidea is a species of foliose lichen in the family Parmeliaceae. Found in China, it was formally described as a new species in 2012 by Xin-Li Wei and Jiang-Chun Wei. The type specimen was collected from Mt. Taibaishan (Shaanxi) at an elevation of 2,800 m (9,200 ft), where it was found growing on the trunk of Abies. It is only known to occur at this location, a cool and moist montane environment supporting lichen-rich forests and woodlands. The species epithet refers to the pruinose upper thallus surface and lobe tips.

== Description ==
The thallus (body of the lichen) is leaf-like and can be up to 6 cm (2.4 in) wide. It has a tough texture and is loosely attached to its surface. The lobes of the thallus are flat, crowded, and hollow, with a width of 0.5–1.0 mm and length of 0.5–2.0 mm. The tips of the lobes are blunt. The upper surface of the thallus is grayish-green and has a bumpy texture. It may have a thin, powdery substance (called pruina) limited to the tips of the lobes. There is a clear line where the pruina stops and the rest of the surface begins. There are no soredia or isidia present, but lobules are present. The lower surface is black and can be brown at the tips of the lobes. There are holes present on many tips of the lobes, in the axils (where the lobes meet), and on the lower surfaces, but they are not surrounded by a raised rim. The medulla is hollow, and both the ceiling and floor of the cavity are white to dirty brown.

No apothecia (a reproductive structure) were observed, but pycnidia (another type of reproductive structure) are present at the tips of the lobes. They are mostly black and small, and the conidia (spores) they produce are long and tapered, measuring 6.0–7.5 by 1.0 μm.

Atranorin, physodic acid, and 3-hydroxyphysodic acids are lichen products consistently found in specimens of this species, while vittatolic acid is usually present.
