= Hypogymnia pendula =

Scientific classification
- Domain: Eukaryota
- Kingdom: Fungi
- Division: Ascomycota
- Class: Lecanoromycetes
- Order: Lecanorales
- Family: Parmeliaceae
- Genus: Hypogymnia
- Species: H. pendula

Binomial name
- Hypogymnia pendula McCune & Li S.Wang (2014)

Species of lichen

Hypogymnia pendula is a rare species of foliose lichen in the family Parmeliaceae. It is characterised by its pendulous (hanging) growth form and distinct chemical composition.

== Taxonomy ==
Hypogymnia pendula was first described by Bruce McCune and Li-Song Wang in 2014. The species was named pendula due to its tendency to grow in a pendulous manner. The holotype specimen was collected in Yunnan, China, in the Jianchuan County at the trailhead to Lao Juen Shan, within an Abies delavayi–Rhododendron forest near a hotel.

== Description ==
The Hypogymnia pendula thallus is pendulous and can grow up to 10–12 cm (3.9–4.7 in) in length. Its texture is cartilaginous, and its branching is mostly isotomic dichotomous with budding present. The upper surface of the thallus is smooth, later becoming rugose or verrucose, and is whitish to pale greenish-grey in colour. It often has a black border and lacks pruina, sometimes displaying dark mottles. The lobes range from 0.5–3 mm in width, and can be separate or contiguous to imbricate. The lobe tips and axils are perforate, as is the lower surface, which has rimmed holes.

Hypogymnia pendula is unique in its genus due to its large spores, which measure 12–16 by 9–12 μm. Most Hypogymnia species, in contrast, have spores that are less than 10 μm long.

Hypogymnia pendula is chemically distinct from its close relative, Hypogymnia macrospora, as it contains physodalic, protocetraric, and physodic acids instead of 4-O-demethylbarbatic acid. This results in a P+ (orange-red) reaction, in contrast to the P− reaction of H. macrospora. Additionally, H. pendula has a POL− hypothecium, while H. macrospora's hypothecium is POL+–indicating the presence of crystalline substances.

== Habitat and distribution ==
This lichen species has been found on the bark of fir trees. Its known distribution is limited to Yunnan Province, specifically Jianchuan and Zhongdian Counties. At the time of publication, only three well-developed specimens had been discovered.
