= Hypogymnia australica =

Scientific classification
- Domain: Eukaryota
- Kingdom: Fungi
- Division: Ascomycota
- Class: Lecanoromycetes
- Order: Lecanorales
- Family: Parmeliaceae
- Genus: Hypogymnia
- Species: H. australica

Binomial name
- Hypogymnia australica Elix (1989)

Species of lichen

Hypogymnia australica is a species of foliose lichen in the family Parmeliaceae. Found in Australia, it was formally described as a new species by lichenologist John Elix in 1989. The type specimen was collected from the Great Dividing Range in New South Wales (about 12 km east of Bungendore) at an altitude of 850 m (2,790 ft). Here it was found growing on a species of Leptospermum.

The lichen has a foliose (leafy), light grey thallus that is loosely attached to its bark substrate and reaches up to 7 cm (2.8 in) in diameter. It contains the secondary compounds atranorin, chloroatranorin, and physodic acid as major metabolites.
