= Jiaozi (disambiguation) =

Jiaozi may refer to

- Jiaozi (simplified Chinese: 饺子; traditional Chinese: 餃子; pinyin: jiǎozi), a kind of Chinese dumplings
- Jiaozi (director), Chinese animation director, screenwriter, and producer
- Jiaozi (currency) (Chinese: 交子), Chinese banknote in the 10th century
- Litter (vehicle), known in Chinese as Jiaozi (Chinese: 轎子)
- Jiaozi Snow Mountain, in northern central Yunnan, China

== See also ==
- Jiaozhi
