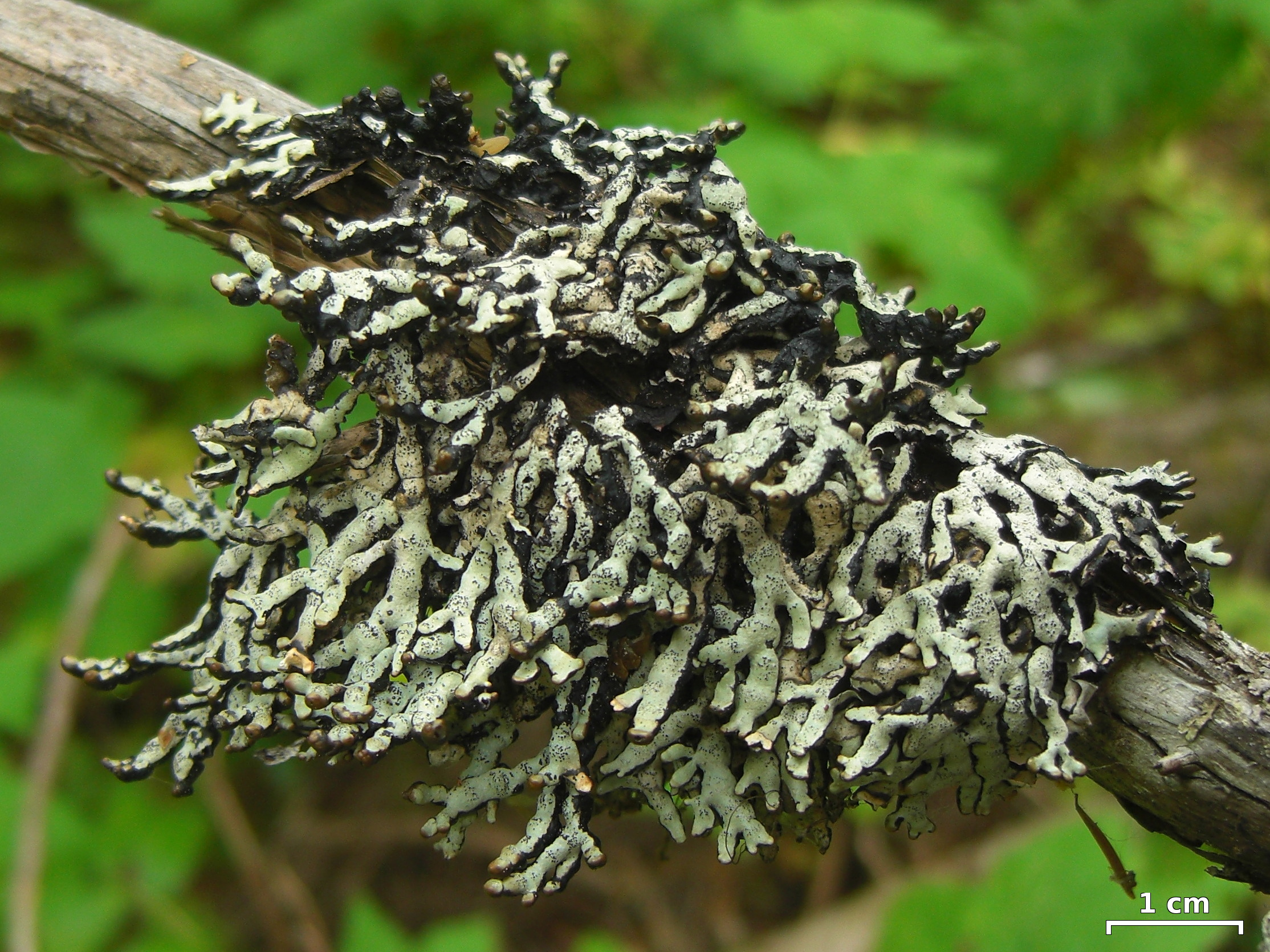

Scientific classification
- Kingdom: Fungi
- Division: Ascomycota
- Class: Lecanoromycetes
- Order: Lecanorales
- Family: Parmeliaceae
- Genus: Hypogymnia
- Species: H. apinnata

Binomial name
- Hypogymnia apinnata Goward & McCune (1993)
- Type locality: Cabinet Range, Montana

= Hypogymnia apinnata =

Species of lichen-forming fungus

Hypogymnia apinnata, the beaded tube lichen, is a corticolous (bark-dwelling) foliose lichen in the family Parmeliaceae. It is found along the Pacific coast of North America from Alaska to the northwestern United States, and also occurs inland in parts of the Pacific Northwest. A separate population is also known from the Canadian Arctic. The lichen forms pale grey, hollow lobes (strap-like sections of the thallus) that are often somewhat swollen and typically lack the small edge projections found in closely related species. It grows mainly on conifer trees in coastal and inland forests, and is most common in cool, humid climates at low to moderate elevations. Brown fruiting bodies are frequently produced, but the species does not form soredia (powdery propagules) typical of many similar lichens.

== Taxonomy ==
Hypogymnia apinnata was described as a distinct species by Trevor Goward and Bruce McCune in 1993. They found that Pacific Northwest material then identified as H. enteromorpha actually fell into two recurring forms that differed in chemistry and morphology. Specimens lacking the usual medullary chemicals (PD– in a standard spot test of the medulla) also tended to have few or no marginal lobules, and they showed a different distribution pattern from chemically typical H. enteromorpha. The epithet apinnata refers to the usual absence of the small, perpendicular marginal lobules, which in related material can create a somewhat pinnate (feather-like) look.

The type specimen was collected from Granite Creek in the Cabinet Range of northwestern Montana, on a branch of western redcedar (Thuja plicata) at 1,070 m (3,510 ft) elevation on August 17, 1982. The common name for the species is "beaded tube lichen".

== Description ==
The thallus (lichen body) is foliose and can be rather closely attached to the substrate or loosely pendulous (hanging), forming a roughly circular to irregular patch up to about 15 cm (6 in) across. The lobes are hollow, typically about 3–4 mm wide but sometimes 2–5 mm. They are often somewhat swollen or nodulose (with small bumps) and may have small holes near the tips. Small edge lobules (bud-like sublobes) are usually absent, though they can occur sparsely in some thalli. The upper surface is pale mineral grey to nearly white and typically shiny. It is mostly smooth, with faint wrinkling in places. The lower surface is black, shiny, and wrinkled, and is often visible from above as a dark border along the lobe edges. Vegetative soredia (powdery propagules) are absent, and the hollow lobes often have a darkened interior.

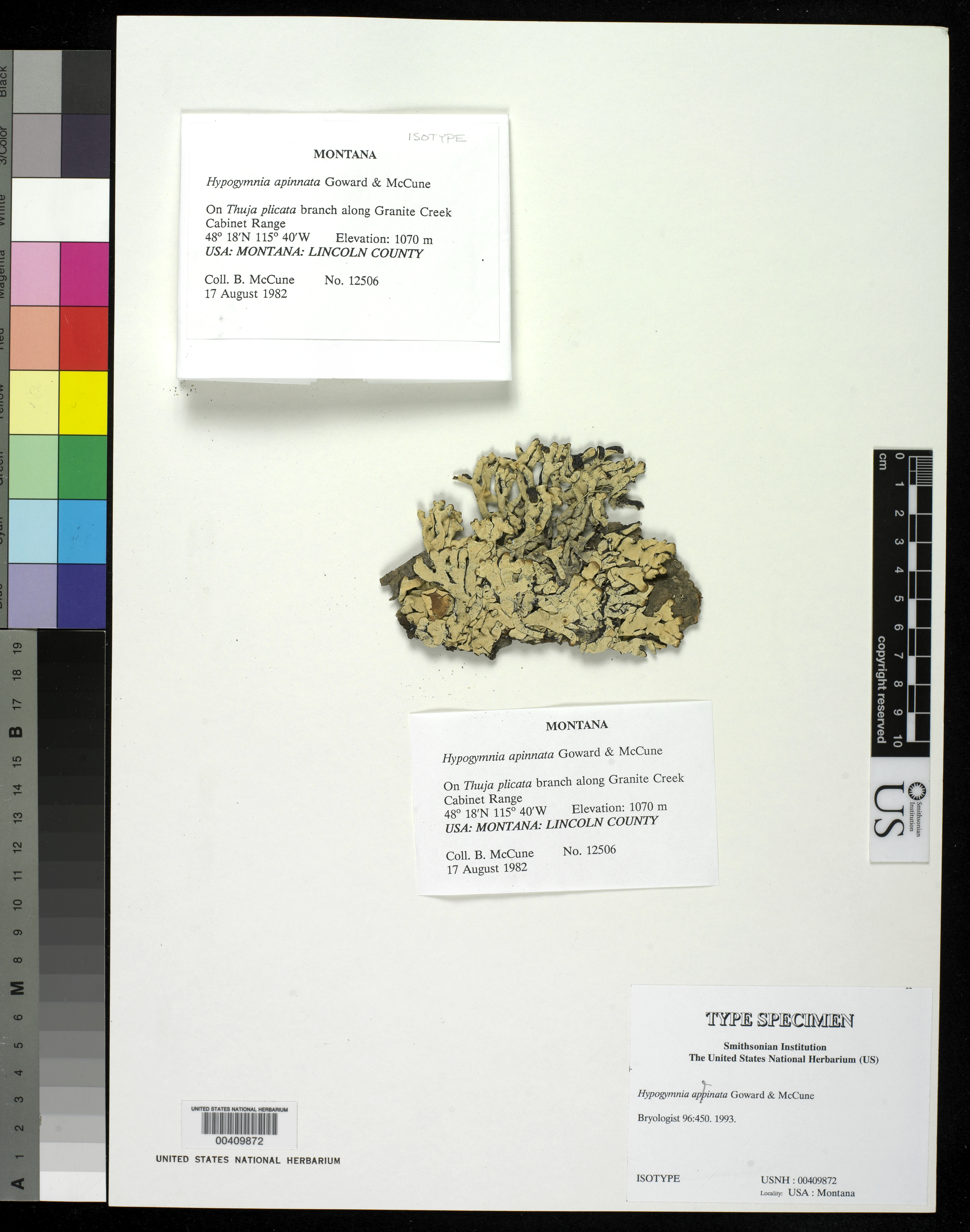
Isotype of Hypogymnia apinnata (McCune 12506), collected on Thuja plicata along Granite Creek, Cabinet Range, Lincoln County, Montana, USA (1,070 m; 17 August 1982); United States National Herbarium (US; USNH 00409872)

Apothecia (fruiting bodies) are common and short-stalked, reaching about 10 mm (0.4 in) in diameter. The disc is medium to dark brown and usually concave. Ascospores are colorless, broadly ellipsoidal to nearly spherical, measuring about 6.5–7.0 × 5.0–5.5 μm. They are produced eight at a time in each ascus (spore sac). The medulla (inner layer) is thin and cottony, white when young but soon darkening around the central cavity.

In chemical spot tests, the cortex is K+ (yellow), consistent with atranorin (with chloroatranorin also reported). Standard spot tests of the medulla are negative (K−, C−, KC−, PD−, I−), which matches the absence of the usual medullary lichen acids that occur in related Hypogymnia. Thin-layer chromatography has also detected fatty acids in North American material, including apinnatic acid (2-methylene-3R-carboxy-18R-hydroxy-nonadecanoic acid), which has been suggested to be characteristic of the species. Other fatty acids may occur as a variable mix sometimes described as an apinnatic acid complex.

== Habitat and distribution ==
Hypogymnia apinnata grows on the bark of conifers and is most frequent in coastal localities at low to moderate elevations, where it often grows alongside H. enteromorpha. It occurs in both exposed and sheltered settings, but individual thalli are reported to do best in sheltered sites. In more exposed places they may be smaller and short-lobed, making identification harder by morphology alone. It is reported to be largely absent in the shaded forest interior beneath the canopy in shady coastal forests.

Records and published range maps place H. apinnata along the Pacific coast from the northwestern United States through British Columbia and well into Alaska (as far west as Attu Island). It also occurs inland in parts of the Pacific Northwest. In southeast Alaska (Klondike Gold Rush National Historic Park), it has been recorded on the bark of Alnus incana, Betula, Picea, Pinus, Populus and Tsuga, as well as on snags. It was reported as rare to absent at the tree line. Within the original study area it was more widespread than H. enteromorpha, and is especially common in inland localities such as the Clearwater Drainage of Idaho, where it occurs in old-growth forests at low to middle elevations.

In southeast and south-central Alaska, H. apinnata was recorded in 113 of 196 forest plots. In a community analysis it was associated with cooler, drier suboceanic climates, while H. enteromorpha was associated with more oceanic conditions. In a regional analysis of conifer-dwelling macrolichens, the species was treated as an oceanic epiphyte, meaning it is adapted to cool, humid climates and occurs mainly in coastal regions. In inland north-western North America it was one of the few oceanic species classed as southern, found mainly south of about 50° N. In coastal localities it extends much farther north. In a large-scale survey of epiphytic macrolichens in western Oregon and Washington, H. apinnata was treated as an indicator of cleaner air conditions and associated with maritime lichen communities in the study's gradient model. In that survey (1,416 plots), it was recorded in 591 surveys and occurred on 32.2% of systematically sampled FIA P3 plots. A population has also been reported from the western shore of Hudson Bay in Nunavut, over 1,500 km from the Pacific Northwest. There it was found saxicolous (rock-dwelling) in tundra at Nuvuk proposed Territorial Park (Kivalliq Region).

In western Oregon, it has been recorded in the canopy of very old Douglas-fir stands. In an about 700-year-old forest it was encountered only rarely in branch sampling, but it was recovered in macrolichen litterfall (material falling from the canopy) in 30% of both forest-interior and clearcut-edge plots (0.52 kg/ha vs 0.21 kg/ha). In the Portland, Oregon metropolitan area, the species has been recorded in epiphytic macrolichen surveys in urban and ex-urban parks, including resurveys of the same plot network in 2012–13. It was also recorded in paired ground and canopy surveys in urban forested parks. In northern California, it has been recorded in old-growth redwood rain forest canopies as an epiphyte on Sitka spruce (Picea sitchensis). In that study, it was most associated with more exposed crown habitats (the outer canopy) and accounted for nearly all Hypogymnia records from the sampled trees.
