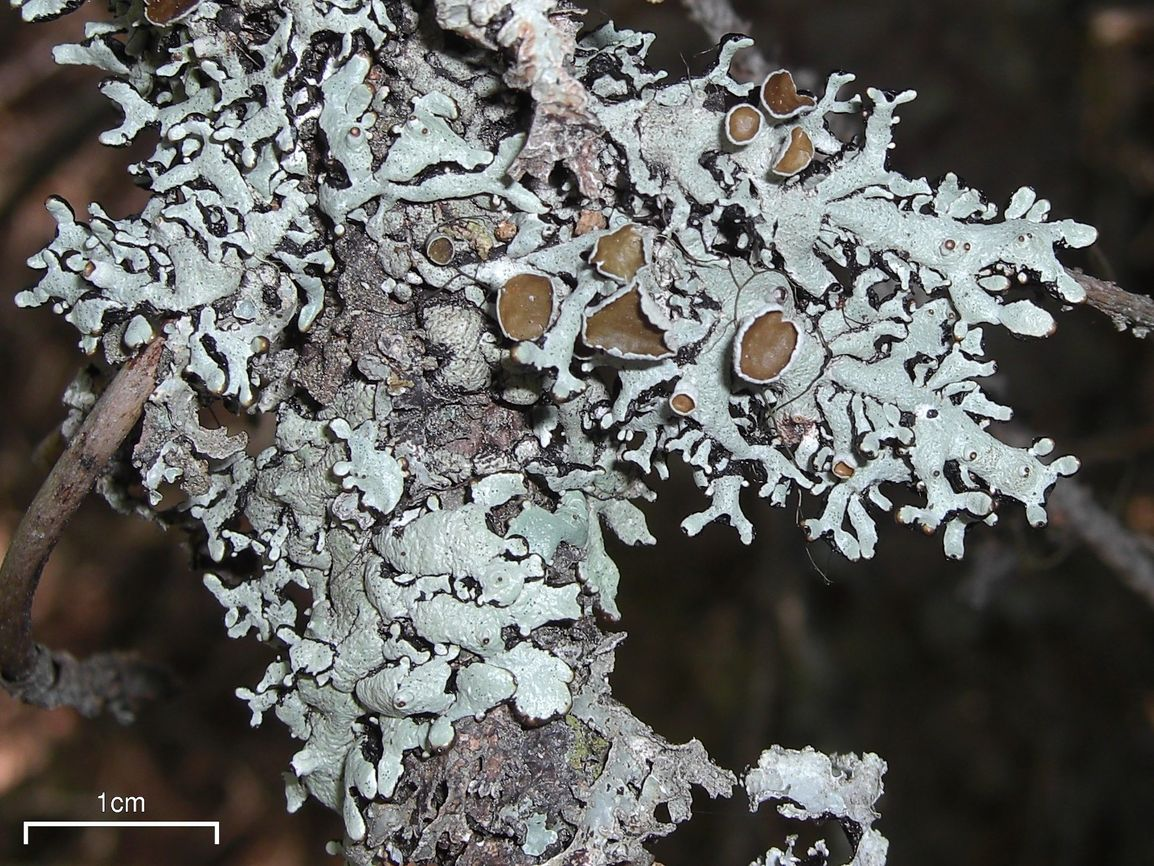

Conservation status
- Secure (NatureServe)

Scientific classification
- Kingdom: Fungi
- Division: Ascomycota
- Class: Lecanoromycetes
- Order: Lecanorales
- Family: Parmeliaceae
- Genus: Hypogymnia
- Species: H. occidentalis

Binomial name
- Hypogymnia occidentalis L.H.Pike (1982)

= Hypogymnia occidentalis =

Species of lichen

Hypogymnia occidentalis, commonly known as the lattice tube lichen, is a species of foliose lichen in the family Parmeliaceae. It is found in North America, where it grows on the lower trunks of conifers, particularly Douglas-fir.

== Taxonomy ==
Hypogymnia occidentalis was described as a new species by Lawrence Pike in 1982. The type of the species is based on a collection made in Big Canyon, Wallowa County (Oregon), which was found by botanist Edmund Perry Sheldon in 1896. The specimen was labeled as "enteromorpha", but as the authors explain, that name had been "applied indiscriminately to vitally every nonseridiate Hypogymnia species in North America at some time."

It is commonly known as "lattice tube lichen".

== Description ==
The thallus of Hypogymnia occidentalis, usually tightly pressed to its substrate, is made of small lobes (typically less than 3 wide). Although sorelia is lacking from the thallus surface, there are small, rounded lobules extending from the sides of the lobes. The lichen contains atranorin and physodic acid.

Hypogymnia rugosa is somewhat similar in appearance to H. occidentalis, but the former has broader lobes, does not have side lobules, and contains hypoprotocetraric acid.

== Habitat and distribution ==
Hypogymnia occidentalis is a common species in the Cascade Mountains and the northern Rocky Mountain area of the United States and Canada; its northern range extend to Alaska. It often grows on the lower trunks of conifers, particularly Douglas-fir, and is found at elevations ranging from sea level up to 1,500 m (4,900 ft). It prefers trees in open or shaded forests, and is rarely found along the coast.
