= Hypogymnia pseudopruinosa =

Scientific classification
- Domain: Eukaryota
- Kingdom: Fungi
- Division: Ascomycota
- Class: Lecanoromycetes
- Order: Lecanorales
- Family: Parmeliaceae
- Genus: Hypogymnia
- Species: H. pseudopruinosa

Binomial name
- Hypogymnia pseudopruinosa X.L.Wei & J.C.Wei (2006)

Species of lichen

Hypogymnia pseudopruinosa is a species of foliose lichen in the family Parmeliaceae, and one of more than 40 species of the genus Hypogymnia that is found in China. It was formally described by Xinli Wei and Jiangchen Wei in 2006. The type was collected from dead branches of Juniperus sabina, in Degen County (Yunnan), at an altitude of 4,100 metres (13,500 ft). It is quite similar in appearance to Hypogymnia macrospora, but that species lacks the dense layer of pruina that is characteristic of H. pseudopruinosa.

Later study showed that the type collection of H. pseudopruinosa was actually mixed with another species, H. laccata. For that reason the authors typified Hypogymnia pseudopruinosa with a lectotype, and revised the description of H. pseudopruinosa.
