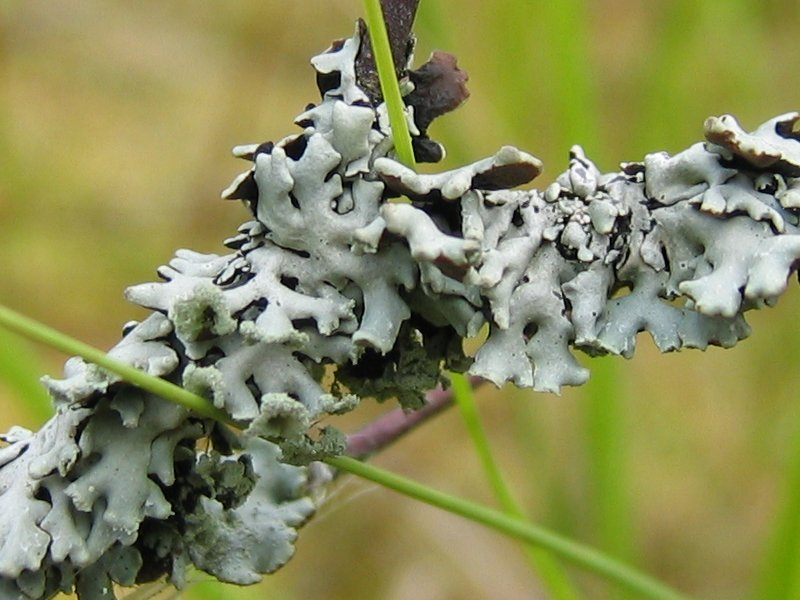
- Hypogymnia physodes

Scientific classification
- Kingdom: Fungi
- Division: Ascomycota
- Class: Lecanoromycetes
- Order: Lecanorales
- Family: Parmeliaceae
- Genus: Hypogymnia (Nyl.) Nyl. (1896)

Type species
- Hypogymnia physodes (L.) Nyl. (1896)

Synonyms
- Parmelia subgen. Hypogymnia Nyl. (1881); Cavernularia Degel. (1937); Ceratophyllum M.Choisy (1951)

= Hypogymnia =

Genus of lichens

Hypogymnia is a genus of foliose lichens in the family Parmeliaceae. They are commonly known as tube lichens, bone lichens, or pillow lichens. Most species lack rhizines (root-like attachment organs on the lower surface) that are otherwise common in members of the Parmeliaceae, and have swollen lobes that are usually hollow. Other common characteristics are relatively small spores and the presence of physodic acid and related lichen products. The lichens usually grow on the bark and wood of coniferous trees.

Hypogymnia was proposed by lichenologist William Nylander, first as a subgenus of Parmelia in 1881, and 15 years later as a distinct genus of two species, including the widespread and common type species, Hypogymnia physodes. It has since grown to about 90 recognized species. Hypogymnia has a centre of biodiversity in China, where many of its species are found.

== Taxonomy ==
Hypogymnia was first created as subgenus of Parmelia by Finnish lichenologist William Nylander in 1881. He associated it with the species Parmelia physodem (which ultimately became the type species, Hypogymnia physodes), noting the lack of rhizines as the characteristic distinguishing it from Parmelia. Nylander later promoted it to generic status in 1896. At this time, the genus contained only two species: Hypogymnia pertusa (currently named Menegazzia terebrata) as well as the type species. For many decades afterwards, the genus did not have widespread recognition, as most lichenologists preferred to include the "hypogymnioid" lichens in the classic form genus Parmelia. In 1951 Hildur Krog considered the morphology and chemistry of this group of species to be distinctive and reinstated the genus Hypogymnia. Krog included four subgenera, including H. subg. Cavernularia and H. subg.Everniiformes. These later became accepted as distinct genera (the former only temporarily; see synonymy below), the latter under the name Pseudevernia.

In 1974, Krog published an account of three Northern Hemisphere Hypogymnia species that grow on acid rock in arctic and alpine habitats. These species, namely H. atrofusca, H. intestiniformis, and H. oroarctica, make up the H. intestiniformis group. This biologically discontinuous assemblage of species was segregated from Hypogymnia by Trevor Goward under the genus name Brodoa in 1986. It differs from Hypogymnia in its compact medulla, larger spores and different cortical structure.

Hypogymnia is classified in the Parmeliaceae. The family Hypogymniaceae has been proposed in the past to contain the genus and other similar hypogymnioid lichens, but this taxonomic arrangement has not been widely accepted by other taxonomists. For example, Krog argued that no critical characters had been suggested that could be used as a defining familial characteristic. In the Parmeliaceae, Hypogymnia belongs to the hypogymnioid clade along with the genera Arctoparmelia, Brodoa, and Pseudevernia. All of these genera share the common characteristic of having a loosely compact medulla.

Hypogymnia lichens are commonly known as "tube lichens", "bone lichens", or "pillow lichens". The name Hypogymnia, derived from the Ancient Greek ὑπο- (hupó, meaning "under") and γυμνός (gumnós, meaning "naked"), refers to the bare lower surface of the thallus.

=== Synonymy ===
Synonyms of Hypogymnia are Cavernularia, created by Gunnar Degelius in 1937, and Ceratophyllum, created by Maurice Choisy in 1951. Cavernularia contained two hypogymnoid species, C. lophyrea and C. hultenii. This species pair has an array of pronounced but small depressions in the lower surface, instead of the smooth or irregularly wrinkled surface typical of Hypogymnia; Degelius called these minute cavities (about 0.1 mm diameter) "cavernulae". The two Cavernularia species are otherwise similar to Hypogymnia in terms of overall morphology, microstructure of the apothecia, and chemistry. Molecular analysis showed that Cavernularia needed to be subsumed into Hypogymnia in order for the latter genus to be monophyletic. This suggested synonymy had already been proposed several decades earlier by Veli Räsänen in 1943 and Hildur Krog in 1952, but not adopted by later authors, including Krog herself.

== Description ==
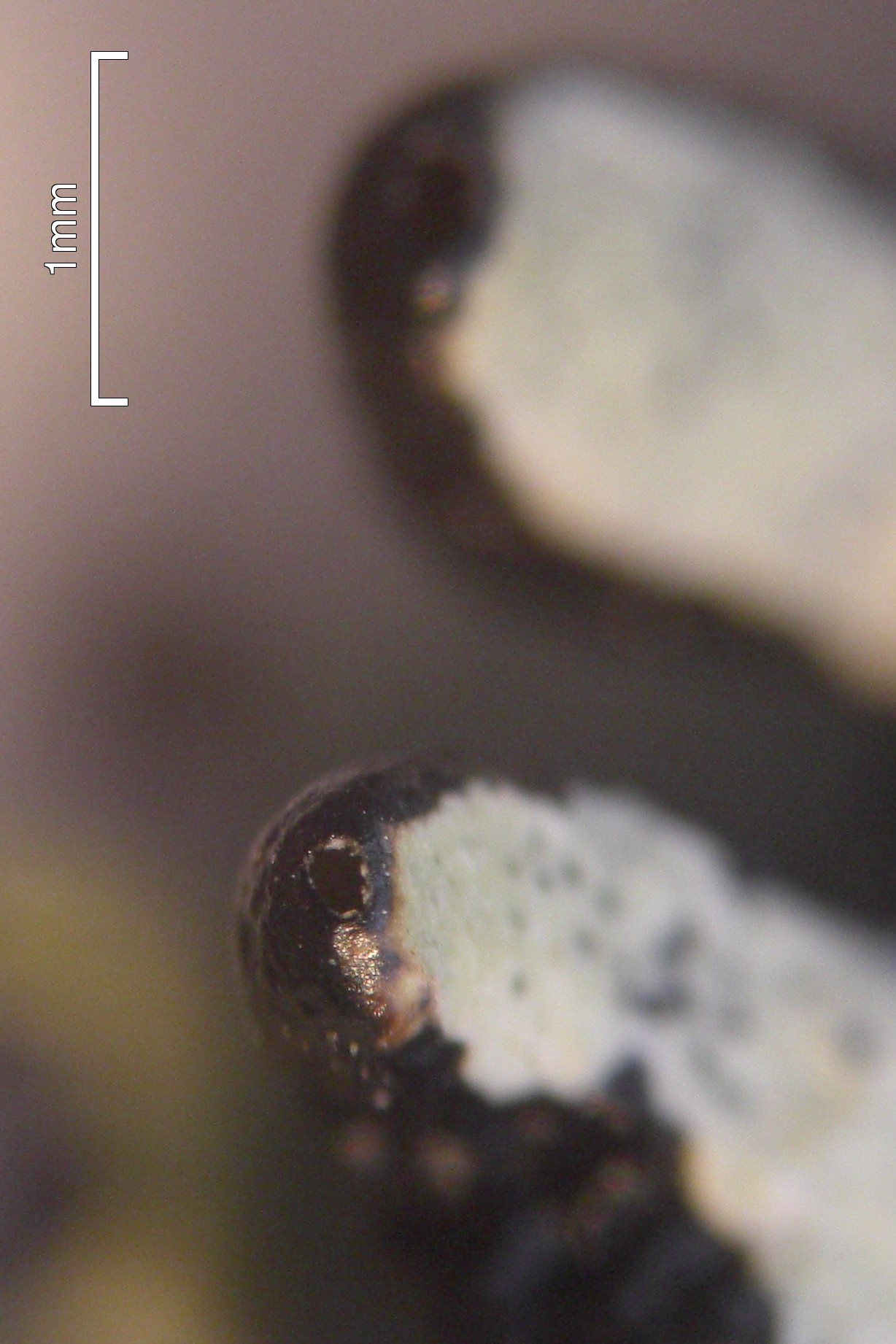
Closeup of a perforated lobe tip of H. occidentalis

Hypogymnia is a genus of medium to large foliose lichens. They are typically greenish grey to brownish grey in colour; some species are yellowish (from usnic acid). The thallus comprises more or less inflated but hollow (tube-like) lobes. These lobes often have a perforation at the tip. The colour of the ceiling of the tubes (the medullary surface) is dark brown or white, and is often used as a characteristic to distinguish between species. The lower surface of the tube is black with a smooth or wrinkled texture.

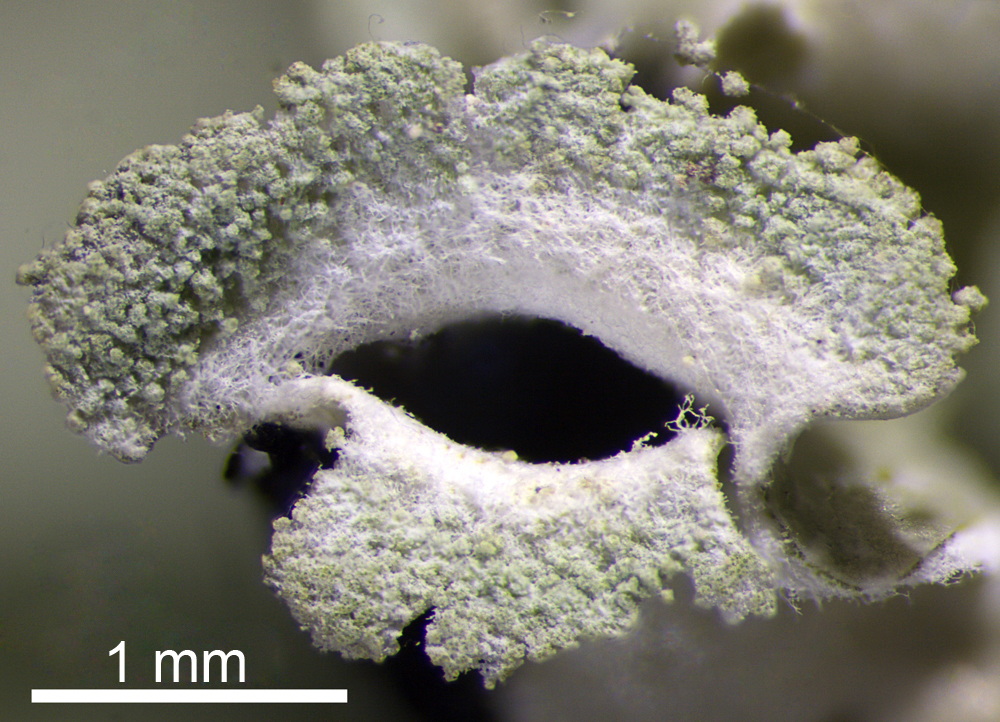
Soralia at the lobe tip of H. physodes; here the tip curls up and back

Rhizines are root-like attachment organs on the lower surface of a lichen thallus, made of elongated strands of hyphae; a shorter version of this attachment organ is called a hapter. Although many recent lichen floras and manuals describe Hypogymnia as lacking rhizines, a 2015 study challenges the universality of this assertion. In the study, researchers studied a large number of Hypogymnia collections, representing 72 species as well as 64 type specimens. They found that rhizines and hapters were occasionally present on the lower surface of 35 species. Two types of attachment organs are found: slender rhizines with fine and tapering tips (found in H. krogiae and H. subfarinacea), and the more common hapters, which are thick with broken tips. Both types are dark brown to black and usually the same colour as the lower surface. In all cases where these attachment organs are found, however, they are few in number and are sparsely distributed on the lower thallus surface.

The apothecia of Hypogymnia are lecanorine in form with a constricted base and are often raised or shaped like an urn. The apothecial discs are red-brown and typically concave. Ascospores are colourless, ellipsoid, and number eight per ascus. They are relatively small, less than 9 μm long. Pycnidia are black and appear as small dots on the surface of the lobes. The photobiont partner is trebouxioid–a green alga from the genus Trebouxia.

The cortex contains atranorin (responsible for the grey colour), while the medullae of most species have physodic acid, and some species contain other orcinol and beta-orcinol depsidones, including protocetraric acid and physodalic acid.

The genus Menegazzia contains species that could be confused with Hypogymnia; Menegazzia, however, has perforations on the upper lobe surface, unlike Hypogymnia. Other superficially similar genera, such as Brodoa and Allantoparmelia, can be distinguished from Hypogymnia by their solid lobes.

== Habitat and distribution ==
Hypogymnia species usually grow on bark and wood, particular that of conifers. Less frequently, they are found on rock or mossy soil. The genus has been recorded on all continents except Antarctica. In tropical to subtropical locations, Hypogymnia appears to be restricted to high elevations, where temperatures are cooler. Seventeen species are recorded from the Himalayan region of India and Nepal, while 31 species are present in North America. In Mexico, it is relatively rare; of the 11 species recorded from there, only two are known from more than 10 collections, and only one, H. guadalupensis, is endemic to the country. Nine species occur in Europe. Southwestern China is a centre of biodiversity for the genus, as more than 40 species occur there. It is one of the few large Parmeliaceae genera that has its main distribution in the Northern Hemisphere.

== Ecology ==
There are several lichenicolous fungi that are known to infect Hypogymnia species. Some of them parasitise specific lichens, such as Plectocarpon hypogymniae (on Hypogymnia bitteri), Lichenopeltella hypogymniae (on Hypogymnia zeylanica), Muellerella antarctica (on Hypogymnia antarctica), Phacopsis cephalodioides (on Hypogymnia physodes). Others have a less specific host range, including Abrothallus prodiens, Epithamnolia xanthoriae, Minutoexcipula calatayudii, Trichonectria anisospora, Endophragmiella franconica, Cyphobasidium hypogymniicola, Tremella hypogymniae, and Tremella papuana. The thalli of Hypogymnia physodes are inhabited by various species of orbatid mites.

== Uses ==
Hypogymnia physodes has been used as a biomonitor for several applications. Examples include monitoring atmospheric nitrogen and sulphur deposition in Norway, the accumulation of mercury downwind of chloralkali plant in Wisconsin, and pollution from several toxic heavy metal elements following the closure of a large mine waste dump close to Zlatna, Romania. It was also used to help evaluate the levels of radionuclides deposited in the environment after the East Urals (1957) and Chernobyl (1988) nuclear accidents. H. tubulosa is an indicator species of old-growth forests. In China, H. physodes and H. pseudoenteromorpha are used as raw materials in the preparation of litmus reagent.

In 15th-century Europe, Hypogymnia physodes was one component (in addition to Evernia prunastri and Pseudevernia furfuracea) of the popular drug "Lichen quercinus virdes". In Traditional Chinese Medicine, Hypogymnia hypotrypa is used for "dim vision, bleeding from uterus, bleeding from external injury, chronic dermatitis, and sores." Hypogymnia flavida and H. hypotrypa serve as raw material in the preparation of antibiotics in China.

== Species ==
About 90 species are recognized in the genus.

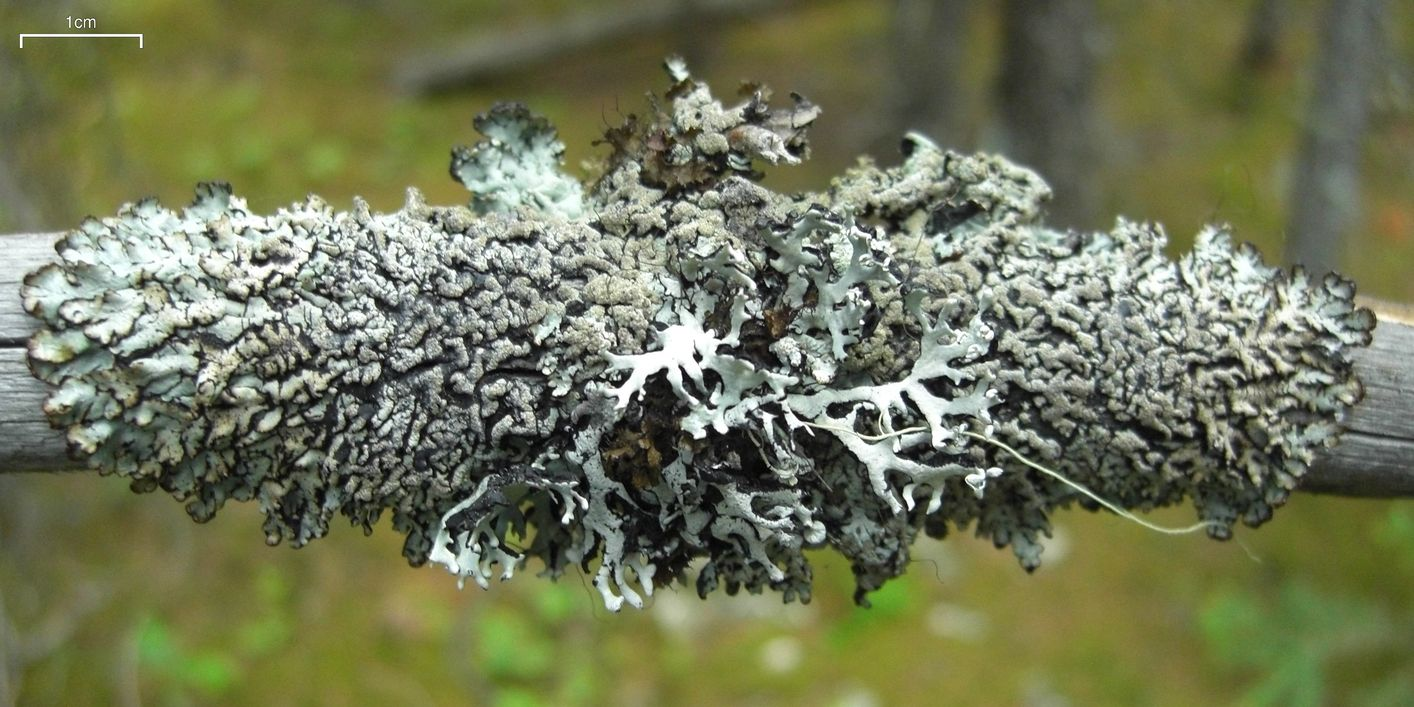
Hypogymnia austerodes

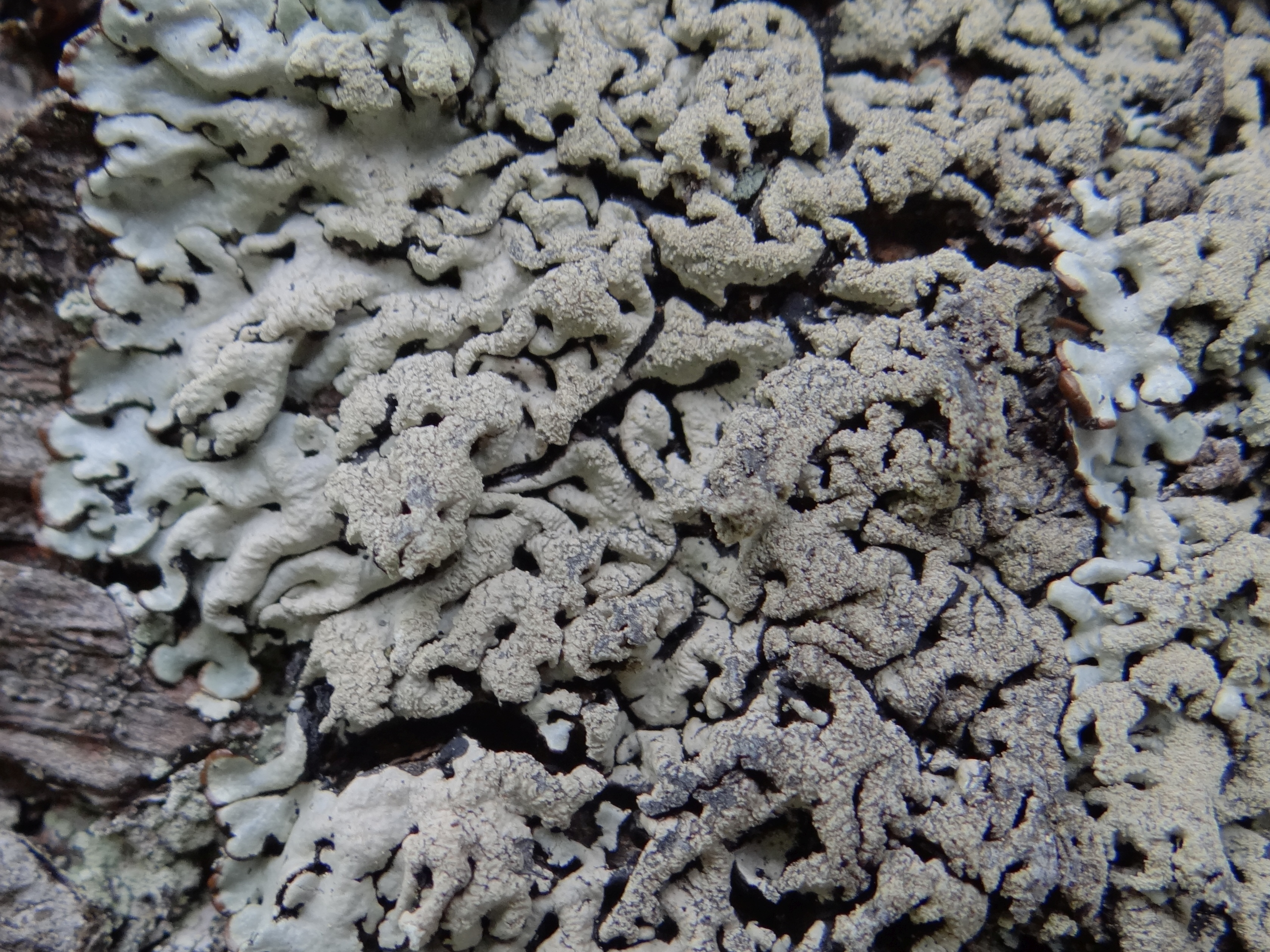
Hypogymnia farinacea

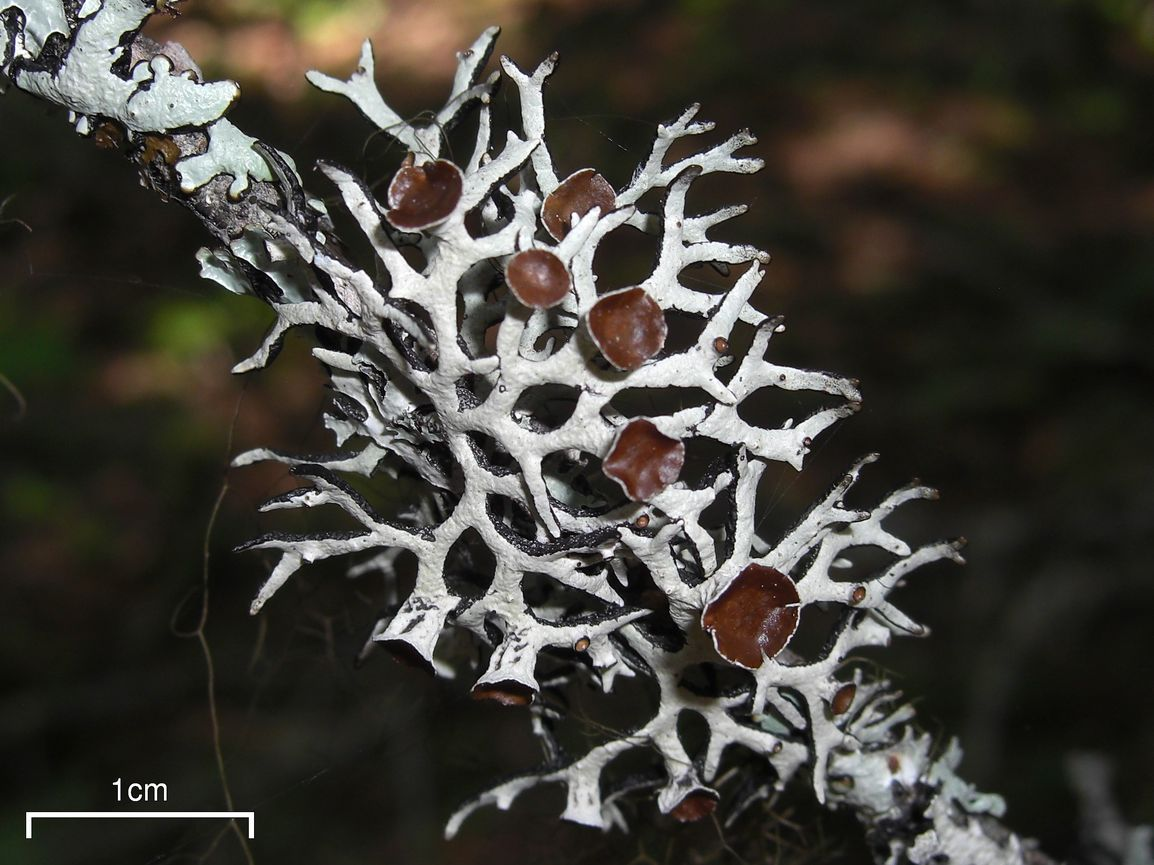
Hypogymnia imshaugii

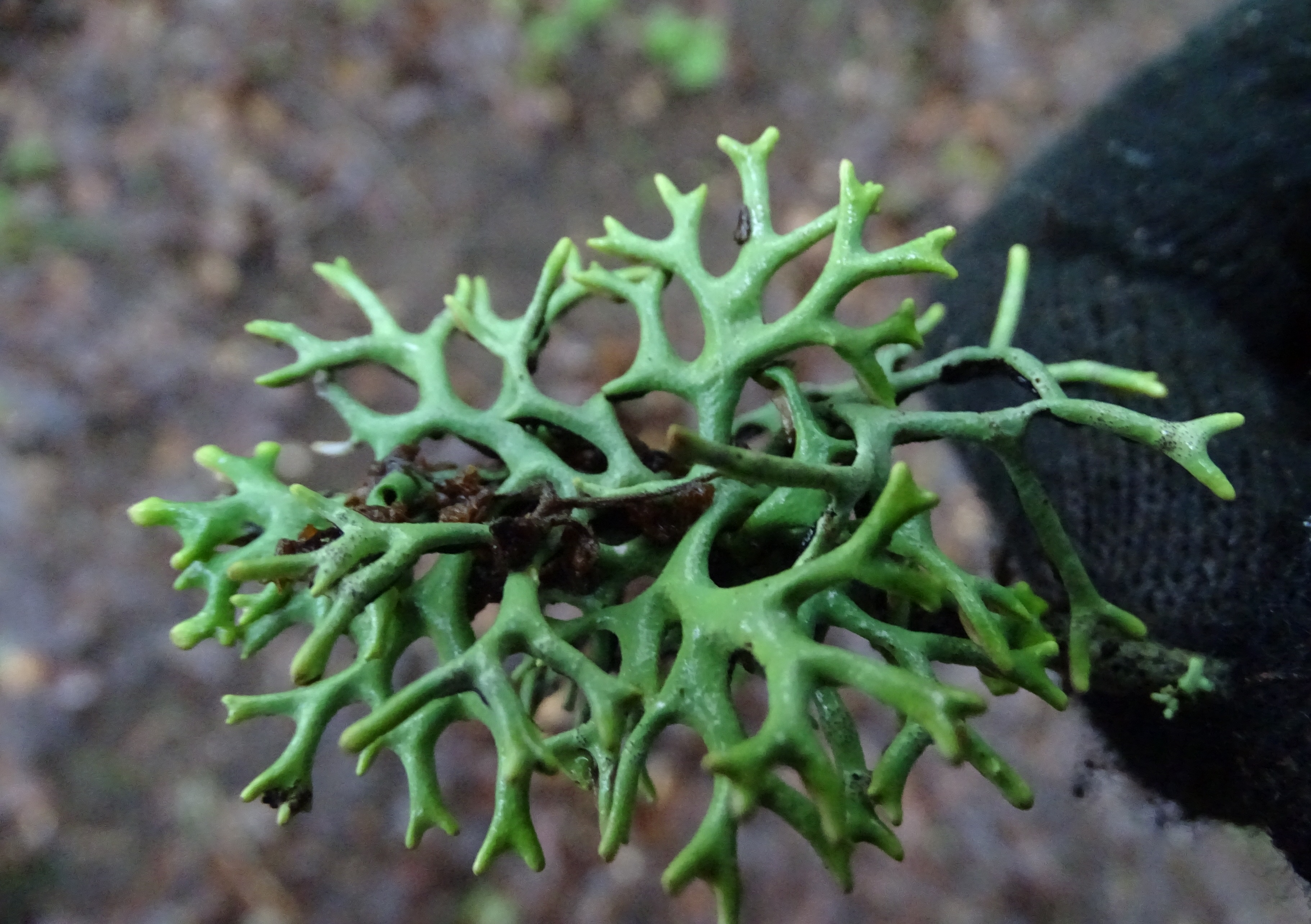
Hypogymnia inactiva

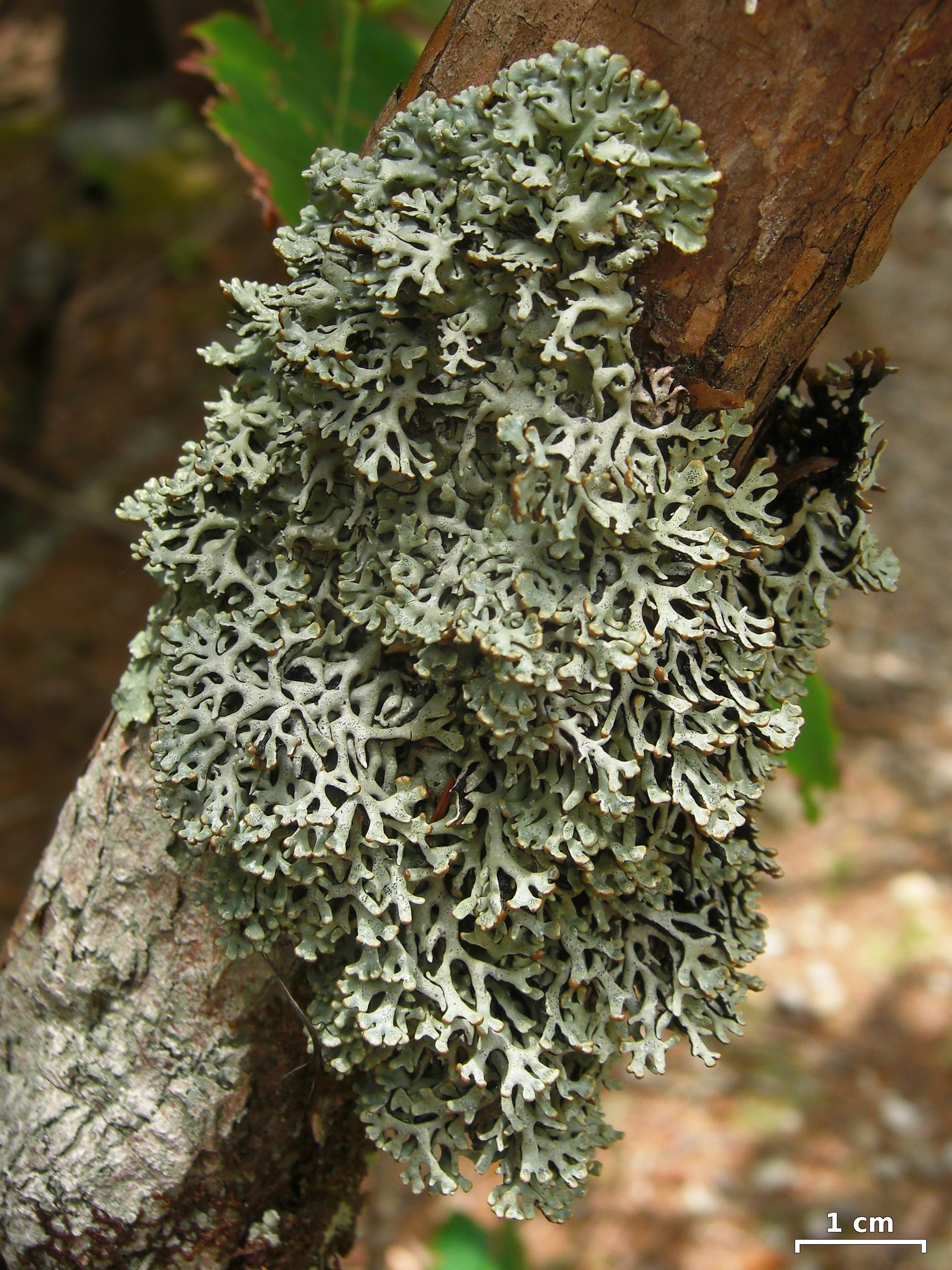
Hypogymnia krogiae

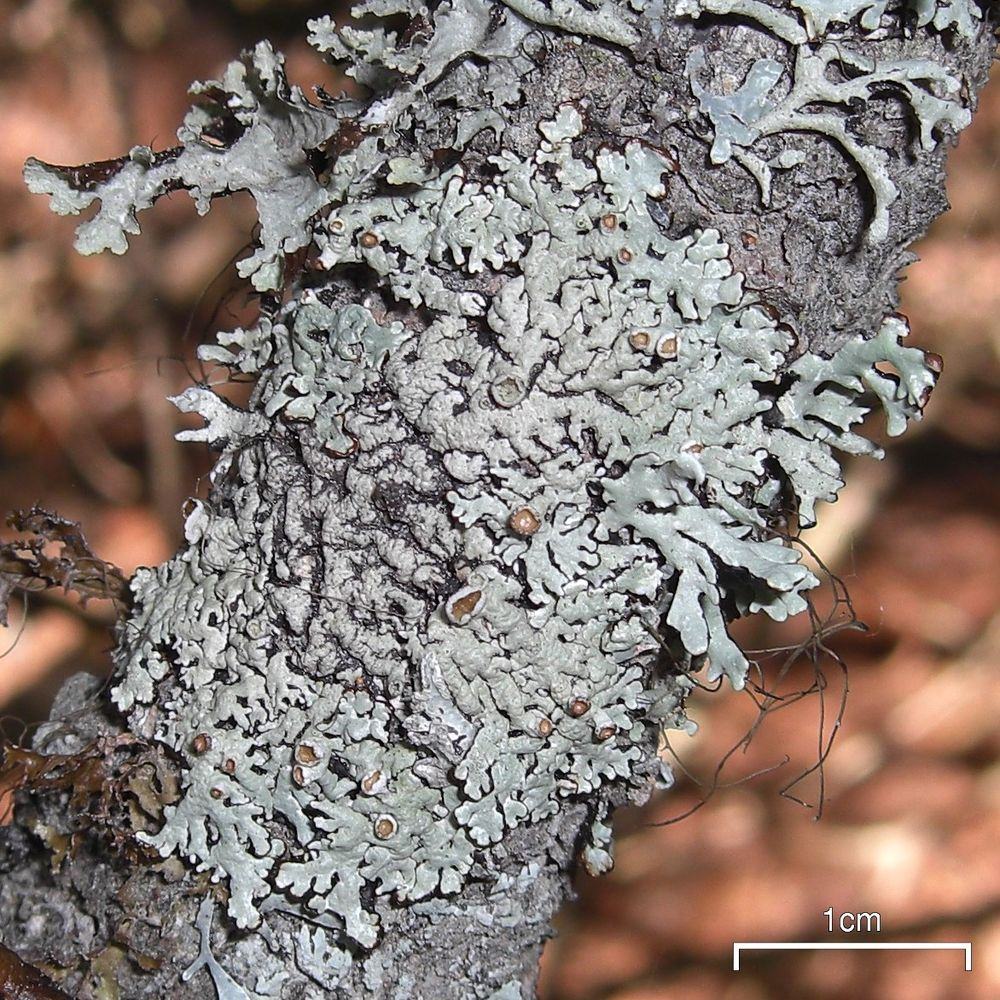
Hypogymnia metaphysodes

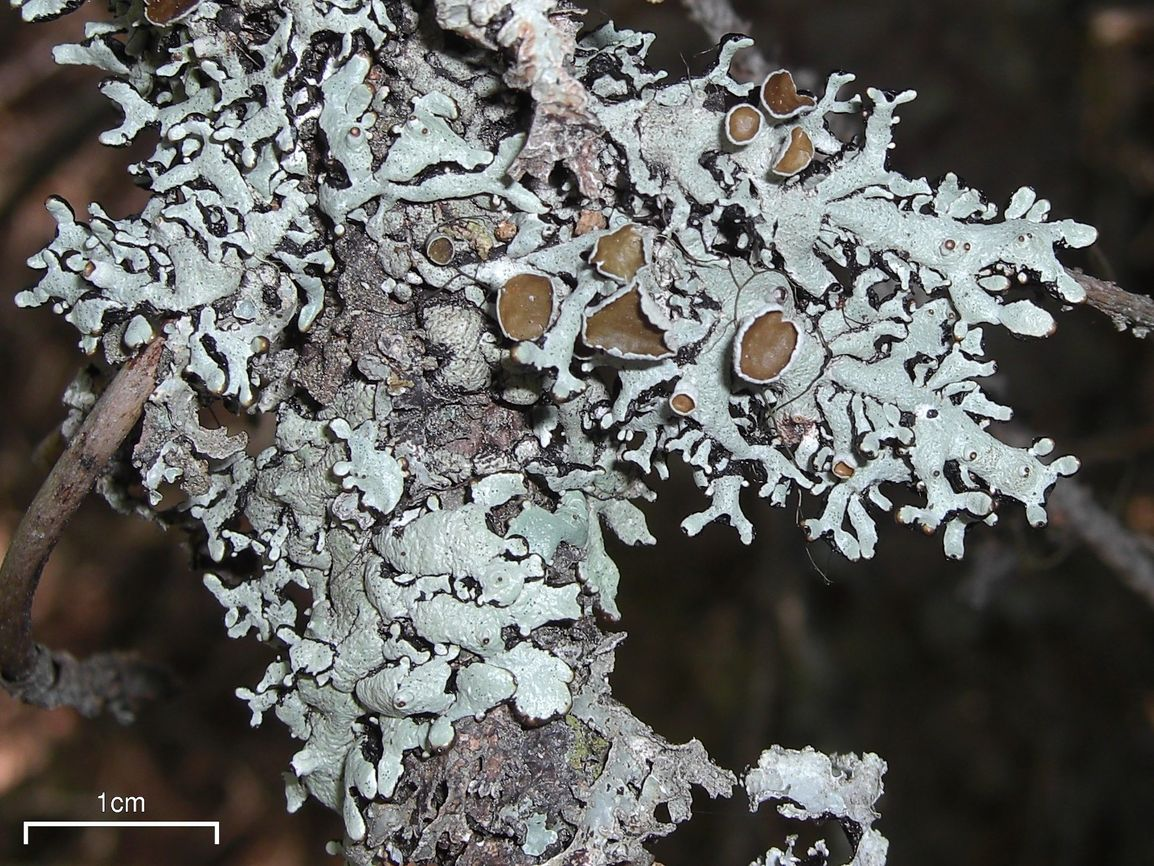
Hypogymnia occidentalis

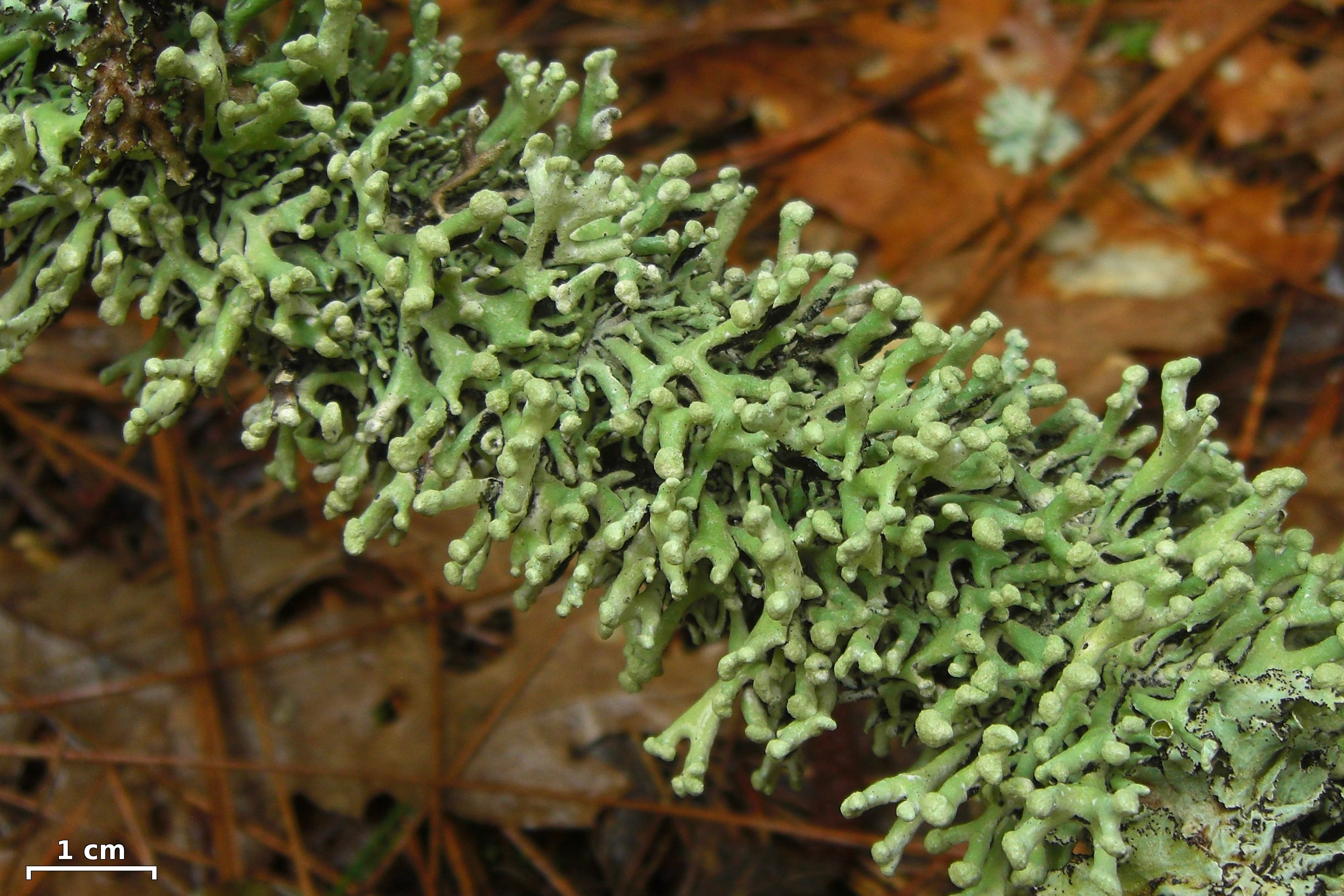
Hypogymnia tubulosa

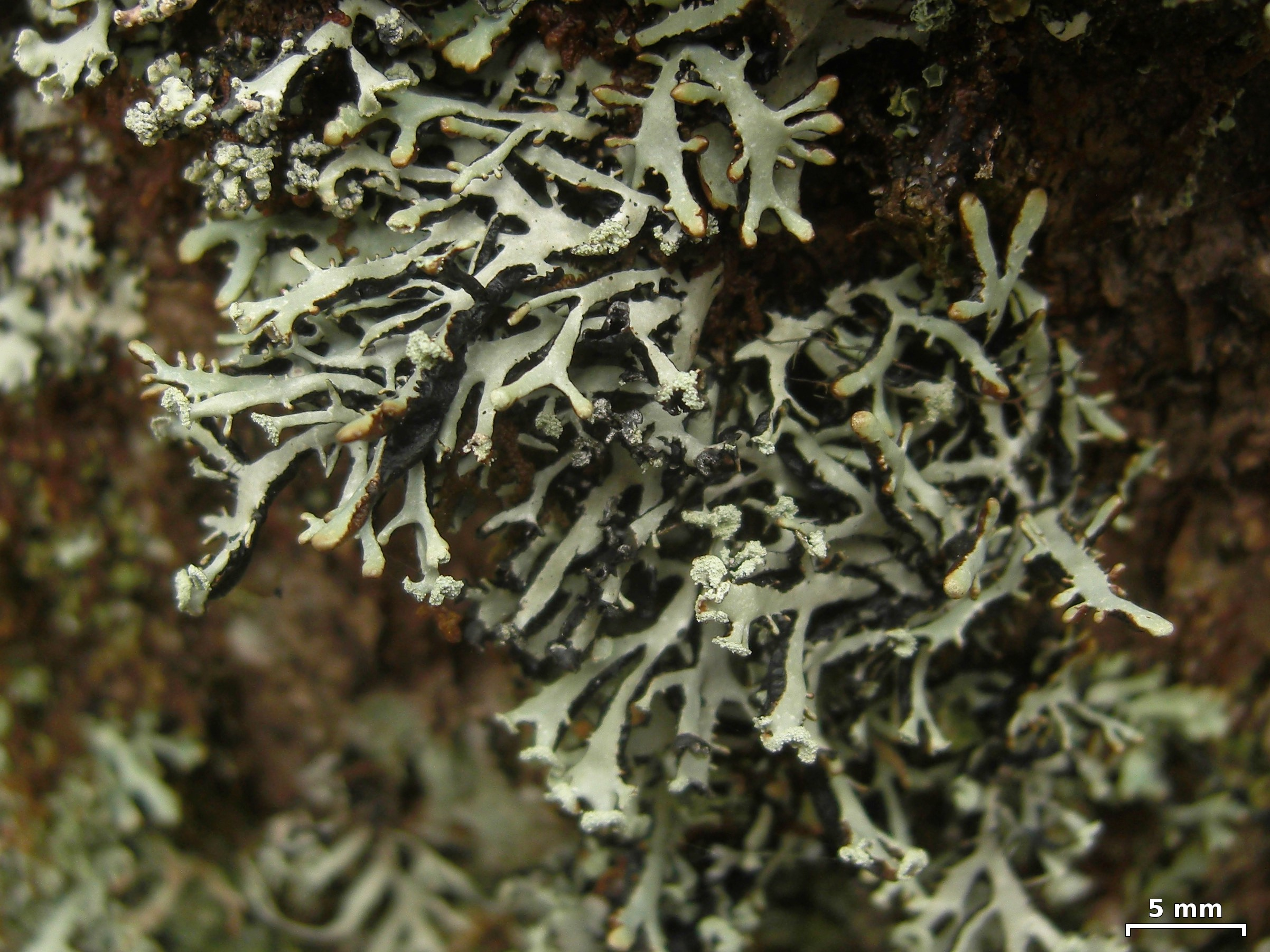
Hypogymnia vittata

- Hypogymnia alpina Awasthi (1984) – China; India; Nepal
- Hypogymnia amplexa Goward, Björk & T.B.Wheeler (2011)
- Hypogymnia apinnata Goward & McCune (1993)
- Hypogymnia arcuata Tchaban. & McCune (2001) – widespread in Northern Hemisphere
- Hypogymnia asahinae K.Yoshida (2001) – Japan
- Hypogymnia austerodes (Nyl.) Räsänen (1943) – Europe
- Hypogymnia australica Elix (1989)
- Hypogymnia beringiana (Krog) McCune (2008) – Alaska; Russia
- Hypogymnia billardierei (Mont.) Filson (1970)
- Hypogymnia bitteri (Lynge) Ahti (1964) – Asia; Europe
- Hypogymnia bryophila McCune (2002) – Portugal
- Hypogymnia bulbosa McCune & Li S.Wang (2003) – China; Taiwan
- Hypogymnia canadensis Goward & McCune (2007) – North America
- Hypogymnia capitata McCune (2014) – China
- Hypogymnia castanea McCune & Krog (2008) – Alaska; Far East Russia
- Hypogymnia congesta McCune & C.F.Culb. (2003) – China
- Hypogymnia crystallina McCune, Divakar & Upreti (2012) – Himalayas
- Hypogymnia delavayi (Hue) Rass. (1956) – China
- Hypogymnia dichroma Goward (2012) – American Cordillera
- Hypogymnia diffractaica McCune (2003) – China
- Hypogymnia discopruina – southwestern China
- Hypogymnia duplicata (Sm.) Räsänen (1967)
- Hypogymnia elgonensis C.W.Dodge (1959) – Africa
- Hypogymnia elongata (Hillmann) Rass. (1956)
- Hypogymnia enteromorpha (Ach.) Nyl. (1900)
- Hypogymnia enteromorphoides Elix (1980)
- Hypogymnia farinacea Zopf (1907) – Europe
- Hypogymnia fistulosa McCune & Krog (2008) – Aleutian Islands; other islands in the Bering Sea; Seward Peninsula
- Hypogymnia flavida McCune & Obermayer (2001) – East Asia
- Hypogymnia fragillima (Hillmann ex Sato) Rass. (1956) – northeast Asia
- Hypogymnia fujisanensis (Asahina) Kurok. (1971)
- Hypogymnia gracilis McCune (2002)
- Hypogymnia guadalupensis McCune (2002)
- Hypogymnia hengduanensis J.C.Wei (1984) – Asia
- Hypogymnia heterophylla L.H.Pike (1982) – North America
- Hypogymnia hokkaidensis Kurok. (1971) – Japan
- Hypogymnia hultenii (Degel.) Krog (1951)
- Hypogymnia hypotrypa (Nyl.) Rass. (1956) – Asia
- Hypogymnia imshaugii Krog (1968 – Alaska
- Hypogymnia inactiva (Krog) Ohlsson (1973)
- Hypogymnia incurvoides Rass. (1967) – Europe
- Hypogymnia inflata C.W.Dodge (1959) – Africa
- Hypogymnia irregularis McCune (2011) – Asia
- Hypogymnia kangdingensis (J.C.Wei) J.B.Chen & J.C.Wei (1989)
- Hypogymnia kiboensis C.W.Dodge (1959) – Africa
- Hypogymnia kosciuskoensis Elix (1980) – Australia
- Hypogymnia krogiae Ohlsson (1973) – North America
- Hypogymnia laccata J.C.Wei & Y.M.Jiang (1980) – southwest China
- Hypogymnia laminisorediata D.Hawksw. & Poelt (1973) – Greece; Morocco
- Hypogymnia laxa McCune (2003) – China
- Hypogymnia lijiangensis J.B.Chen (1994) – China
- Hypogymnia lugubris (Pers.) Krog (1968)
- Hypogymnia lophyrea (Ach.) Krog (1951)
- Hypogymnia macrospora (J.D.Zhao) J.C.Wei (1991) – China
- Hypogymnia madeirensis (Tav.) D.Hawksw. (1973)
- Hypogymnia magnifica X.L.Wei & McCune (2010) – China
- Hypogymnia metaphysodes (Asahina) Rass. (1967) – Asia
- Hypogymnia minilobata McCune & C.L.Schoch (2009) – United States
- Hypogymnia mollis L.H.Pike & Hale (1982) – North America
- Hypogymnia mundata (Nyl.) Oxner ex Rass. (1956)
- Hypogymnia nikkoensis (Zahlbr.) Rass. (1967)
- Hypogymnia nitida McCune & Li S.Wang (2014) – China
- Hypogymnia obscurata (Bitter) Räsänen (1943)
- Hypogymnia occidentalis L.H.Pike (1982) – Oregon
- Hypogymnia oceanica Goward (1988) – North America
- Hypogymnia papilliformis McCune, Tchaban. & X.L.Wei (2015) – Russian Far East; China
- Hypogymnia pectinatula (Zahlbr.) Elix (1989) – Java; Papua New Guinea; Philippines; North Borneo
- Hypogymnia pendula McCune & Li S.Wang (2014) – China
- Hypogymnia physodes (L.) Nyl. (1896) – widespread in Northern Hemisphere
- Hypogymnia protea Goward, T.Sprib. & Ahti (2012) – American Cordillera
- Hypogymnia pruinoidea X.L.Wei & J.C.Wei (2012) – China
- Hypogymnia pruinosa J.C.Wei & Y.M.Jiang (1980) – China
- Hypogymnia pseudobitteriana (D.D.Awasthi) D.D.Awasthi (1971) – Asia; Papua New Guinea
- Hypogymnia pseudocyphellata McCune & E.P.Martin (2003) – China
- Hypogymnia pseudoenteromorpha M.J.Lai (1980) – Japan
- Hypogymnia pseudophysodes (Asahina) Rass. (1967) – northeast Asia
- Hypogymnia pseudopruinosa X.L.Wei & J.C.Wei (2006) – China
- Hypogymnia pulchrilobata (Bitter) Elix (1980)
- Hypogymnia pulverata (Nyl.) Elix (1980)
- Hypogymnia recurva Goward, Björk & Hollinger (2010) – North America
- Hypogymnia rhodesiana C.W.Dodge (1959) – Africa
- Hypogymnia sachalinensis Tchaban. & McCune (2002) – east Asia
- Hypogymnia salsa Goward (2012) – American Cordillera
- Hypogymnia saxicola McCune & Li S.Wang (2014) – China
- Hypogymnia schizidiata McCune (2002)
- Hypogymnia sikkimensis G.P.Sinha & Elix (2003) – Sikkim, India
- Hypogymnia sinica J.C.Wei & Y.M.Jiang (1980) – China
- Hypogymnia stricta (Hillmann) K.Yoshida (2001) – Asia
- Hypogymnia subarticulata (J.D.Zhao, L.W.Hsu & Z.M.Sun) J.C.Wei & Y.M.Jiang (1986) – Asia
- Hypogymnia subcrustacea (Flot.) Kurok. (1971)
- Hypogymnia subduplicata (Rass.) Rass. (1973)
- Hypogymnia subfarinacea X.L.Wei & J.C.Wei (2006) – China
- Hypogymnia submundata (Oxner) Rass. (1967)
- Hypogymnia subobscura (Vain.) Poelt (1962) – Europe
- Hypogymnia subphysodes (Kremp.) Filson (1970)
- Hypogymnia subpruinosa J.B.Chen (1994) – China
- Hypogymnia subvittata (J.D.Zhao) J.C.Wei (1991)
- Hypogymnia taiwanalpina M.J.Lai (1980) – Taiwan
- Hypogymnia tasmanica Elix (1989)
- Hypogymnia tavaresii D.Hawksw. & P.James (1973) – Canary Islands
- Hypogymnia tenuispora McCune & Li S.Wang (2014) – China
- Hypogymnia thomsoniana (Müll.Arg.) D.D.Awasthi (1985) – Asia
- Hypogymnia tubularis (Taylor) Elix (1980)
- Hypogymnia tubulosa (Schaer.) Hav. (1918) – Europe
- Hypogymnia tuckerae – Oregon & California
- Hypogymnia turgidula (Bitter) Elix (1980)
- Hypogymnia verruculosaGoward (2012) – American Cordillera
- Hypogymnia vittata (Ach.) Parrique (1898) – Asia; Europe; North America
- Hypogymnia wattiana (Müll.Arg.) D.D.Awasthi (1985)
- Hypogymnia wilfiana Goward, T.Sprib. & Ahti (2010) – North America
- Hypogymnia yunnanensis Y.M.Jiang & J.C.Wei (1990) – China
- Hypogymnia zeylanica (R.Sant.) D.D.Awasthi & Kr.P.Singh (1971) – Sri Lanka

Hypogymnia contains three species pairs: H. krogiae and the sorediate counterpart H. incurvoides, H. minilobata and the sorediate H. mollis, and H. lophyrea and the sorediate H. hultenii.
