= Hypogymnia wilfiana =

Conservation status
- Secure (NatureServe)

Scientific classification
- Kingdom: Fungi
- Division: Ascomycota
- Class: Lecanoromycetes
- Order: Lecanorales
- Family: Parmeliaceae
- Genus: Hypogymnia
- Species: H. wilfiana

Binomial name
- Hypogymnia wilfiana Goward, T.Sprib. & Ahti (2010)

Species of lichen

Hypogymnia wilfiana is a species of foliose lichen in the family Parmeliaceae. It is found in western North America, where it grows on conifer trees.

== Taxonomy ==
Hypogymnia wilfiana was formally described as a new species in 2010 by the lichenologists Trevor Goward, Toby Spribille, and Teuvo Ahti. The type specimen was collected in Clearwater Valley, British Columbia, at an altitude of 1,000 m (3,300 ft). Here it was found growing on a branch of Pseudotsuga. The specific epithet honours Canadian bryologist Wilfred Borden Schofield (1927–2008).

== Description ==
The lichen has three typical growth forms: appressed, imbricate, and swollen; the first two forms are most common at lower elevations. Hypogymnia wilfiana contains the secondary compound 2-methylene-3-carboxy-18-hydroxynonadecanoic acid ("apinnatic acid"), recorded for the first time from the genus Hypogymnia. Other compounds present in the lichen are atranorin (upper cortex), physodic acid, and di-O-methylphysodic acid.

== Habitat and distribution ==
The distribution of Hypogymnia wilfiana spans from the Yukon south to Oregon and western Montana and extends to western Alberta in Canada. It occurs in inland, mostly intermontane regions. In the Pacific Coast area, it occurrence is mainly limited to the upper crowns of old trees. It is usually found on conifers, particularly Pseudotsuga, Abies, Picea, and Tsuga.
