= Hypogymnia bulbosa =

Scientific classification
- Domain: Eukaryota
- Kingdom: Fungi
- Division: Ascomycota
- Class: Lecanoromycetes
- Order: Lecanorales
- Family: Parmeliaceae
- Genus: Hypogymnia
- Species: H. bulbosa

Binomial name
- Hypogymnia bulbosa McCune & Li S.Wang (2003)

Species of lichen in the family Parmeliaceae

Hypogymnia bulbosa is a species of foliose lichen in the family Parmeliaceae. Found in Southern China, it was described as a new species by Bruce McCune and Li-Song Wang in 2003. The type specimen was collected from the Zi ben Mountain in Cao County (Yunnan). There it was found growing on a spruce stump. It has also been recorded growing on the bark and wood of fir, willow, and Rhododendron. It is known to grow at elevations ranging between 2,800–3,800 metres (9,200–12,500 ft), generally in conifer forests. The lichen is characterized by features such as the rimmed holes on the lower surface of the thallus, the presence of the chemical physodalic acid, and the adundant budding.
