= Hypogymnia hultenii =

Conservation status
- Secure (NatureServe)

Scientific classification
- Kingdom: Fungi
- Division: Ascomycota
- Class: Lecanoromycetes
- Order: Lecanorales
- Family: Parmeliaceae
- Genus: Hypogymnia
- Species: H. hultenii

Binomial name
- Hypogymnia hultenii (Degel.) Krog (1951)

Synonyms
- Cavernularia hultenii Degel. (1937)

Species of lichen

Hypogymnia hultenii is a species of foliose (leafy) lichen in the family Parmeliaceae. It was first described as Cavernularia hultenii by Swedish lichenologist Gunnar Degelius in 1937. Hildur Krog transferred it to the genus Hypogymnia in 1951.

== Habitat and distribution ==
Hypogymnia hultenii is found exclusively in cool coastal coniferous forests, due to it mainly growing on the small twigs of such trees. Its three populations exist in North America's Pacific Northwest forests, the coast of Labrador and Nova Scotia, as well as the forests of central Norway.

The origin of the disjunct populations of Hypogymnia hultenii is still being researched. It is likely that it is due to its once undisturbed range during the Pliocene being fragmented by glaciers. This is supported by its incredibly slow rate of genetic drift, which has prevented speciation between all of these ranges.
