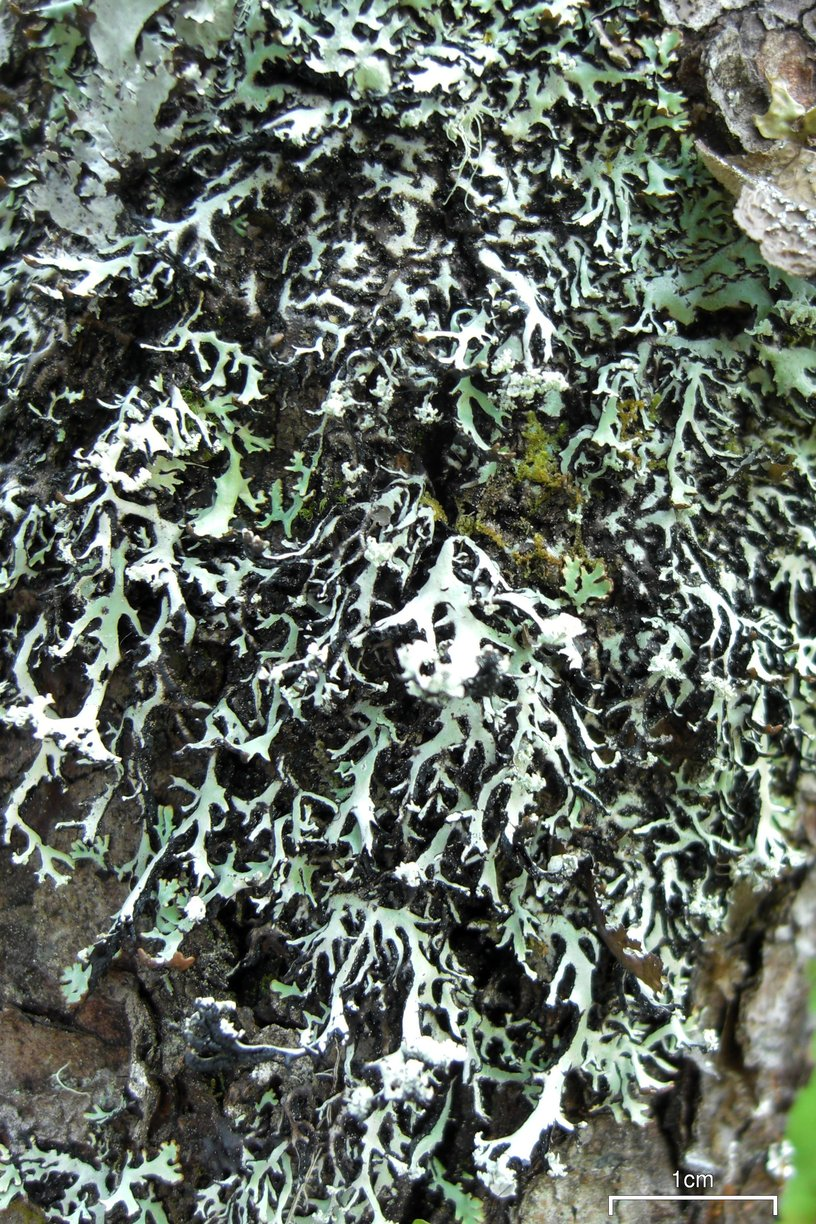

Conservation status
- Secure (NatureServe)

Scientific classification
- Kingdom: Fungi
- Division: Ascomycota
- Class: Lecanoromycetes
- Order: Lecanorales
- Family: Parmeliaceae
- Genus: Hypogymnia
- Species: H. vittata

Binomial name
- Hypogymnia vittata (Ach.) Parrique (1898)

Synonyms
- Parmelia physodes var. vittata Ach. (1803) (basionym)

= Hypogymnia vittata =

Species of lichen-forming fungus

Hypogymnia vittata is a species of lichen-forming fungus belonging to the family Parmeliaceae.

It has cosmopolitan distribution. In Nepal, H. vittata has been reported from 2,800 to 4,200 m elevation in a compilation of published records.
