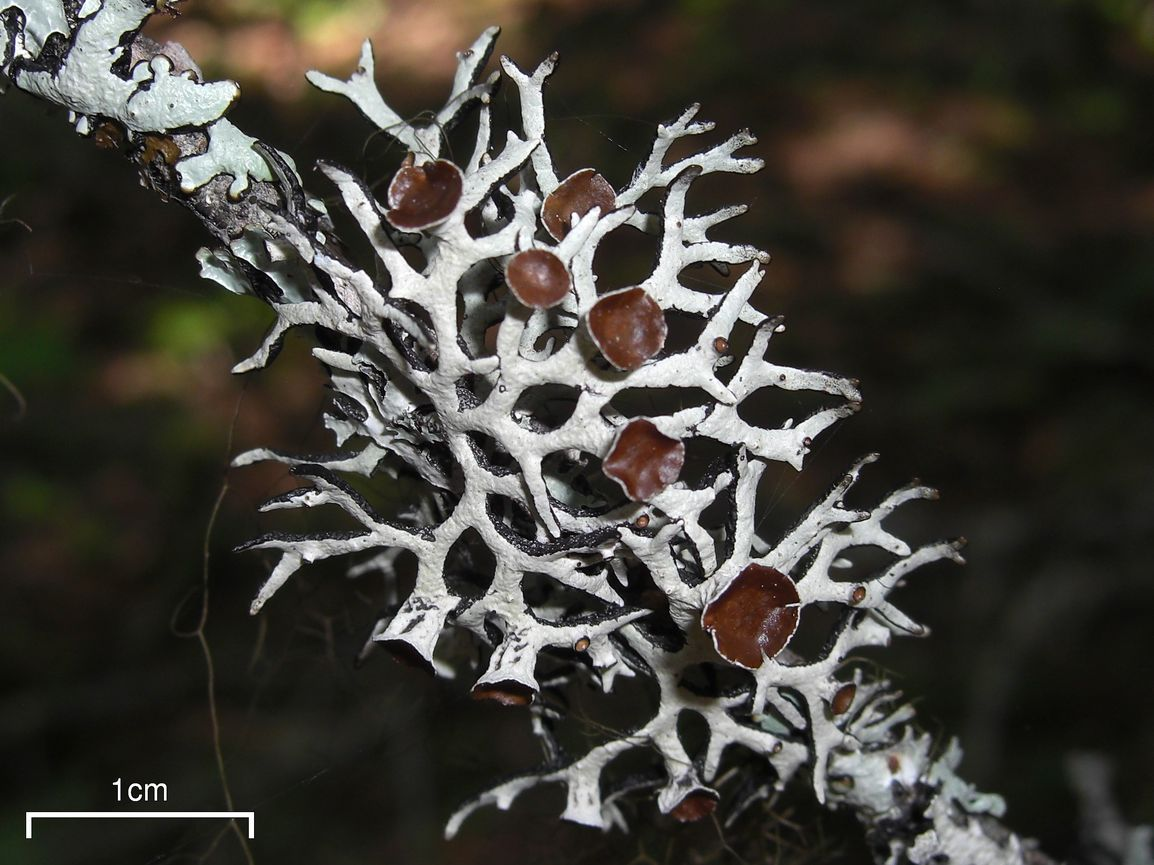

Conservation status
- Secure (NatureServe)

Scientific classification
- Kingdom: Fungi
- Division: Ascomycota
- Class: Lecanoromycetes
- Order: Lecanorales
- Family: Parmeliaceae
- Genus: Hypogymnia
- Species: H. imshaugii

Binomial name
- Hypogymnia imshaugii Krog (1968)

= Hypogymnia imshaugii =

Species of lichen in the family Parmeliaceae

Hypogymnia imshaugii, commonly known as the forked tube lichen, is a common species of foliose lichen in the family Parmeliaceae. It was formally described as a new species by Norwegian botanist Hildur Krog in 1968. It has a grey to gray-green thallus with slender lobes measuring up to 2 mm wide that are branched dichotomously at regular intervals. It has cup- to disc-shaped apothecia that are constricted at the base. The lichen grows on conifer branches, preferring inland habitats that are moderately dry.
