= Hypogymnia duplicata =

Scientific classification
- Kingdom: Fungi
- Division: Ascomycota
- Class: Lecanoromycetes
- Order: Lecanorales
- Family: Parmeliaceae
- Genus: Hypogymnia
- Species: H. duplicata

Binomial name
- Hypogymnia duplicata (Ach.) Rass. (1967)

Synonyms
- Lichen duplicatus Sm. (1803); Parmelia duplicata (Sm.) Ach. (1803)

Species of lichen-forming fungus

Hypogymnia duplicata, the ticker-tape lichen, is a species of bark- and wood-dwelling foliose lichen in the family Parmeliaceae. It is found in northwestern North America. It has narrow, ribbon-like lobes and typically lacks the powdery or finger-like outgrowths that many lichens use for vegetative spread. When conditions are suitable, it can form loose, draping tufts that hang from branches and trunks.

== Taxonomy ==
Erik Acharius published the name Parmelia duplicata in his 1803 work Methodus qua omnes detectos lichenes, treating it as distinct but linking it to the manuscript name Lichen duplicatus attributed to "D. Smith. The taxon was based on material reported from the western coast of boreal North America collected by Archibald Menzies. In his brief Latin diagnosis, Acharius described a loose, smooth, membranous thallus that was pale on the upper surface but black beneath, with linear lobes that were repeatedly divided and branched and tended to be inflated. He also remarked that apothecia (fruiting bodies) were unknown to him at the time, so his concept rested entirely on thallus form. In an additional note, he considered it allied to Parmelia colpodes (now Anzia colpodes), but said it differed in having looser, more inflated linear lobes.

The Soviet lichenologist Kseniya Aleksandrovna Rassadina recombined the species in the genus Hypogymnia in 1967.

== Description ==
Hypogymnia duplicata is commonly known as the "ticker-tape lichen". It is a foliose lichen that can reach diameters of up to 30 cm (12 in), although a range of 4–20 cm (1.6–7.9 in) is more typical. It has long and slender lobes measuring to about 1 mm wide, and curved branches that may drape from the substrate. The thallus is whitish gray to pale greenish gray on the upper surface, and black below. The interior of the lobes has a light, sometimes white ceiling and a dark floor. Apothecia (fruiting bodies) are uncommon, and vegetative propagules such as isidia or soredia are not present. The expected results for standard chemical spot tests are PD+ (red), K−, KC+ (pink), and C− in the medulla, and K+ (yellow) on the cortex. Secondary metabolites that are present in the lichen include diffractaic acid, physodalic acid, and protocetraric acid.

== Habitat and distribution ==
Hypogymnia duplicata grows on the bark and wood of coniferous trees, often in fens and coastal bogs. It is found on the Pacific Coast of northwestern North America, with a range extending north from Alaska south to California. The southern extent of its range is Corvallis, Oregon in the Coast Range, and Mount Hood in the Cascade Range.

In a survey of 196 forest plots in southeast and south-central Alaska, Root and colleagues recorded H. duplicata as a common epiphytic macrolichen. In that dataset it was associated with more oceanic (coastal) conditions, and was less frequent in cooler, drier inland settings.
