= Jiaozi Snow Mountain =

Mountain located in northern central Yunnan, China

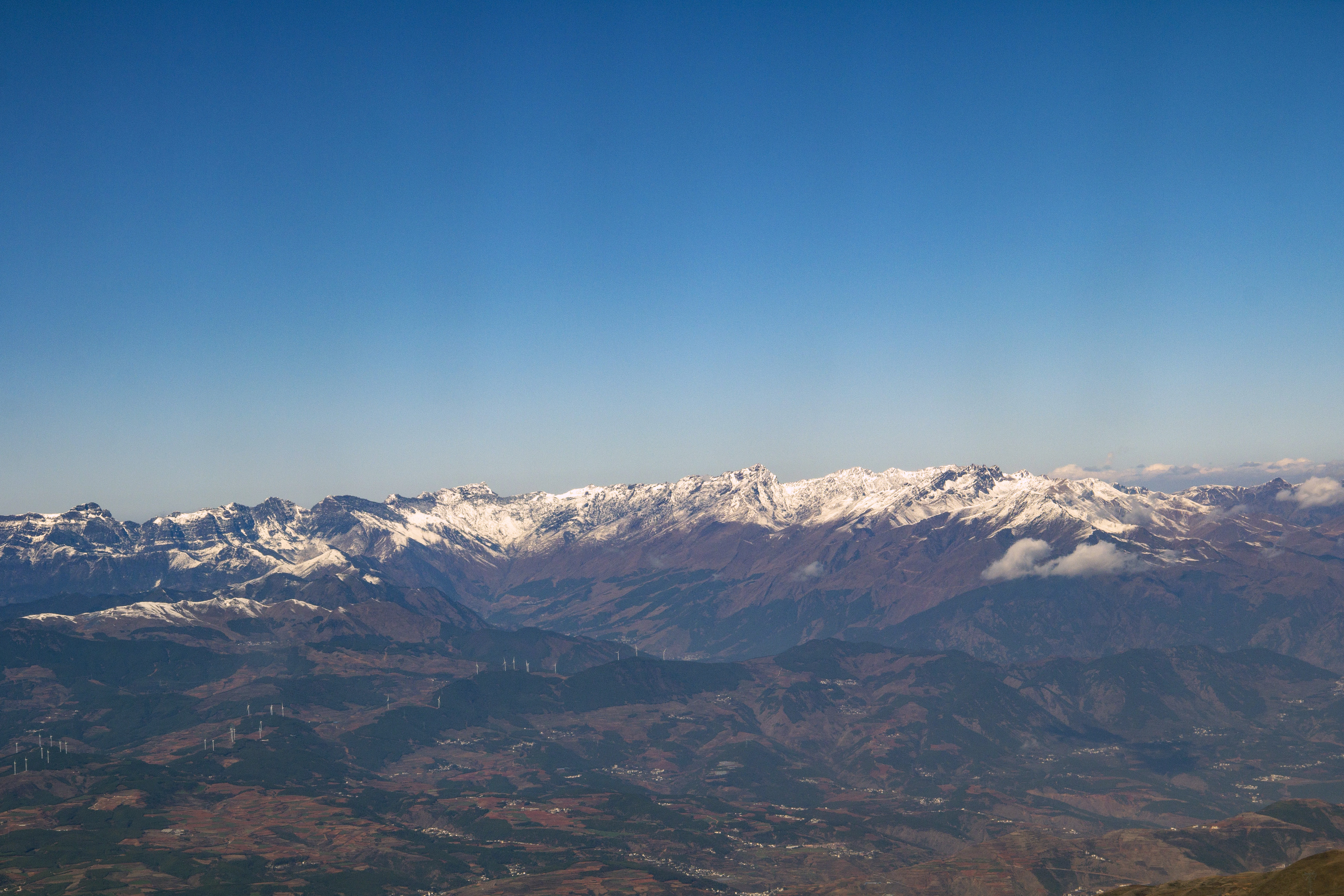
- A south view of the main peak JiaoDing

Highest point
- Elevation: 4,330 m (14,210 ft)
- Prominence: 2,470 m (8,100 ft)
- Coordinates: 26°08′58″N 102°54′47″E

Geography
- Location within Yunnan Location within China

Jiaozi Snow Mountain (simplified Chinese: 轿子雪山; traditional Chinese: 轎子雪山; pinyin: Jiàozǐ Xuěshān) is a mountain located in northern central Yunnan, China. The mountain peak lies on the border Dongchuan District and Luquan County in Kunming city-level prefecture. The peak is the highest point in the Eastern Yungui Plateau and the highest point of the Gongwang Mountains. Jiaozi Snow Mountain is drained on all sides by tributaries of the Yangtze River, whose main stem flows past 20 km to the northwest.

== See also ==
- List of ultras of Tibet, East Asia and neighbouring areas
