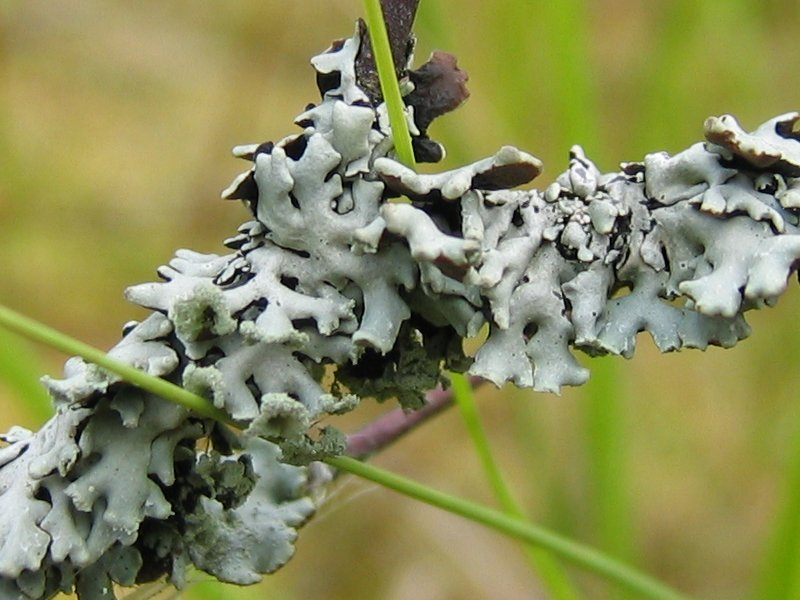

Conservation status
- Secure (NatureServe)

Scientific classification
- Kingdom: Fungi
- Division: Ascomycota
- Class: Lecanoromycetes
- Order: Lecanorales
- Family: Parmeliaceae
- Genus: Hypogymnia
- Species: H. physodes

Binomial name
- Hypogymnia physodes (L.) Nyl. (1896)

Synonyms
- Lichen physodes L. (1753)

= Hypogymnia physodes =

Species of lichen in the family Parmeliaceae

Hypogymnia physodes, commonly known as the monk's-hood lichen, is a species of foliose lichen in the family Parmeliaceae. It is a common and widespread species in boreal and temperate forests of the Northern Hemisphere. It has a grey to yellowish-green thallus that is loosely attached to its substrate and forms large irregular patches. Hollow lobes are 2–3mm wide. The outer edge turns up and is frequently covered with white powdery soredia underneath. Its lower surface is black, wrinkled and has some browning toward the lobe margins. The pycnidia are black and abundant, and their presence creates a pepper-like effect across the upper surface. Because of its abundance and its moderate sensitivity to sulphur dioxide and heavy metals, Hypogymnia physodes is often used in bioindicator and biomonitoring studies that enable the assessment of air pollution and other environmental conditions.

== Extract ==
Hypogymnia physodes extract is recognised as having pharmacological potential. Its major component is physodic acid, which is able to cross the blood-brain barrier.

== See also ==
- List of lichens named by Carl Linnaeus
