= Bruce McCune =

American botanist and lichenologist

- Born: Bruce Pettit McCune; January 30, 1952 (age 74)
- Education: University of Montana; University of Wisconsin–Madison
- Known for: PC-ORD
- Spouse: Patricia S. Muir
- Awards: Acharius Medal (2016)
- Scientific career
- Fields: Lichenology; Botany
- Workplaces: Oregon State University
- Author abbrev. (botany): McCune

Bruce Pettit McCune (born 1952) is an American lichenologist, botanist, plant ecologist, and software developer for analysis of ecological data.

== Biography ==
McCune grew up in Cincinnati. He completed his freshman year of college at Lawrence University in Appleton, Wisconsin, and then transferred to the University of Montana in the autumn of 1971. There he graduated in 1974 with a bachelor's degree in botany. From 1971 to 1974 McCune and his then girlfriend, Patricia S. Muir, spent considerable time on Mount Sentinel, where they investigated lichens, mosses, and other plants. From 1974 to 1975 he travelled and also worked for two summers in Montana for the Bureau of Land Management. From 1976 to 1979 he was a graduate student at the University of Montana, where he graduated with a master's degree. In August 1979 he married Patricia Muir. She graduated in 1975 with a bachelor's degree in botany from the University of Montana. In 1979 the couple matriculated as graduate students at the University of Wisconsin-Madison. There he received in 1982 his Ph.D. with a dissertation on forest ecology and she received in 1984 her Ph.D. with a dissertation on plant ecology. In 1984 he became a postdoc in Indianapolis. At Oregon State University he was from 1987 to 1993 an assistant professor, from 1993 to 1999 an associate professor, and from 1999 to the present a full professor. Patricia Muir also obtained a professorship at Oregon State University.

The genus Bruceomyces is named in honor of Bruce McCune. Since 2012 he has been a member of the editorial board of The Bryologist.

He and his wife have two daughters.

== See also ==
- Category:Taxa named by Bruce McCune
