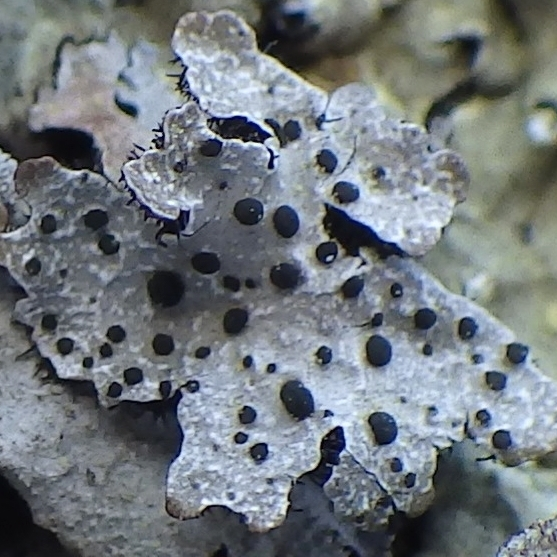
- parasitic Abrothallus parmeliarum on Parmelia saxatilis

Scientific classification
- Kingdom: Fungi
- Division: Ascomycota
- Class: Dothideomycetes
- Order: Abrothallales; Pérez-Ort. & Suija (2013)
- Family: Abrothallaceae; Pérez-Ort. & Suija (2013)
- Genus: Abrothallus; De Not. (1845)

Type species
- Abrothallus bertianus De Not. (1849)

Synonyms
- Abrothallomyces Cif. & Tomas. (1953); Epinephroma Zhurb. (2012); Phymatopsis Tul. ex Trevis. (1857); Pseudo-lecidea Marchand (1896)

= Abrothallus =

Genus of fungi

Abrothallus is a genus of lichenicolous (lichen-dwelling) fungi. It is the only genus in the monotypic family Abrothallaceae, which itself is the sole taxon in the order Abrothallales. Species produce small, blackish, nearly spherical fruiting bodies on the surface of their host lichens, often dusted with green or yellow powder (pruina). About 44 species are accepted, most of them parasites of leafy or shrubby macrolichens.

== Taxonomy ==
The genus was circumscribed by the Italian botanist Giuseppe De Notaris in 1849. The classification of the genus in either family or order was uncertain until molecular phylogenetic analysis revealed the group as an independent lineage in the class Dothideomycetes. Both the family and the order were circumscribed in 2013 by Sergio Pérez-Ortega and Ave Suija.

In 2012 Mikhail Zhurbenko proposed the genus Epinephroma to contain E. kamchatica; later analysis showed it to be the anamorph of an Abrothallus species, and now Epinephroma is placed in synonymy with Abrothallus. Other synonyms are Abrothallomyces, Phymatopsis, and Pseudo-lecidea.

Recent multigene studies have shown that host association has played an important role in the evolution of Abrothallus, but not in a simple one-host-group, one-lineage pattern. Species growing on Ramalina, for example, do not form a single clade, and A. bryoriarum, which grows on Bryoria, is more closely related to some Ramalina-associated species than to the main Parmeliaceae clade. This suggests that similar host-linked forms have evolved more than once within the genus. A 2026 revision of Ramalina-associated species showed that the traditional concepts of A. suecicus and A. ramalinae each include several genetically distinct lineages. That study described A. farinaceae as a new species on Ramalina farinacea and suggested that additional Ramalina-associated taxa remain undescribed.

== Description ==
Species of Abrothallus are fairly uniform in overall appearance. They usually produce blackish, nearly spherical ascomata without a well-defined margin, often dusted with green or yellow pruina; bitunicate asci (with two functional wall layers) containing four to eight brown, 2- to 4-celled, warted, asymmetric ascospores; ramified-anastomosed paraphyses; and an epihymenium (the uppermost layer of the hymenium) with granulose pigments that often dissolve in potassium hydroxide. Species are distinguished mainly by microscopic characters such as ascospore size and septation, whether the spores split into part-spores, the number of spores in each ascus, pigmentation and chemical reactions in the ascomatal tissues, and host preference. Most species occur on foliose, fruticose, or pendulous macrolichens, and in some species only the pycnidial asexual state is known.

== Ecology ==
Species of Abrothallus range from apparently mild lichen associates to clearly pathogenic parasites. In the more damaging species, infected parts of the host become blackened and brittle, the host tissues lose their normal internal structure, and both fungal hyphae and algal cells may collapse. This kind of damage has been documented in species growing on Ramalina and Bryoria.

== Species ==
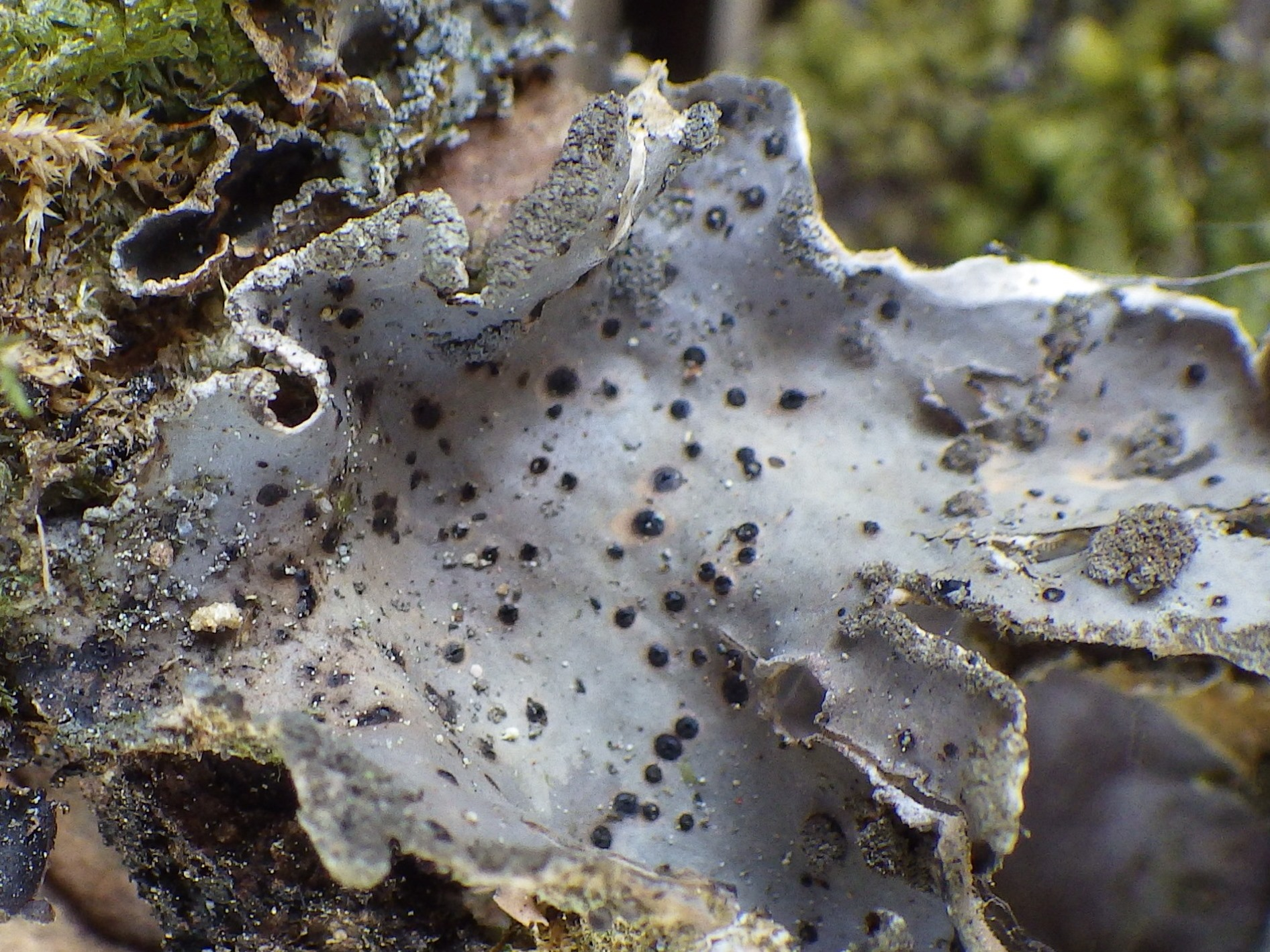
Abrothallus welwitschii growing on Sticta limbata in Portugal

As of March 2026, Species Fungorum (in the Catalogue of Life) accepts 46 species of Abrothallus:

- Abrothallus acetabuli Diederich (1990) – parasitic on Parmelia acetabulum; from Europe
- Abrothallus altoandinus Flakus, Etayo & Rodr.Flakus (2023)
- Abrothallus boomii Pérez-Ort. & Suija (2015)
- Abrothallus brattii (S.Y.Kondr.) Suija & Pérez-Ort. (2015)
- Abrothallus bryoriarum Hafellner (1994)
- Abrothallus caerulescens I.Kotte (1909)
- Abrothallus canariensis Pérez-Ort., van den Boom & Suija (2015)
- Abrothallus cetrariae I.Kotte (1909)
- Abrothallus cladoniae R.Sant. & D.Hawksw. (1990)
- Abrothallus curreyi Linds. (1867) – New Zealand
- Abrothallus doliiformis Pérez-Ort. & Suija (2015)
- Abrothallus eriodermae Suija, Etayo & Pérez-Ort. (2015)
- Abrothallus ertzii Suija & Pérez-Ort. (2015)
- Abrothallus etayoi Pérez-Ort. & Suija (2015)
- Abrothallus farinaceae Suija & Frisch (2026) – on blackened parts of Ramalina farinacea; Europe and North America
- Abrothallus granulatae Wedin (1994) – parasitic on Pseudocyphellaria granulata; from Argentina
- Abrothallus halei Pérez-Ort., Suija, D.Hawksw. & R.Sant. (2010) – parasitic on Lobaria quercizans and L. pulmonaria; from Europe and North America
- Abrothallus heterodermiicola Etayo & F.Berger (2017)
- Abrothallus hypotrachynae Etayo & Diederich (2002)
- Abrothallus kamchatica (Zhurb. & Stepanch.) Pérez-Ort. & Suija (2015)
- Abrothallus lobariae (Diederich & Etayo) Diederich & Ertz (2018)
- Abrothallus macrosporus Etayo & R.Sant. (2010) – South America
- Abrothallus microspermus Tul. (1852)
- Abrothallus nephromatis Suija & Pérez-Ort. (2015)
- Abrothallus niger Etayo (2017) – Ecuador
- Abrothallus parmeliarum (Sommerf.) Arnold (1874)
- Abrothallus parmotrematis Diederich (2011)
- Abrothallus peyritschii (Stein) I.Kotte (1909)
- Abrothallus pezizicola Diederich & R.C.Harris (2003)
- Abrothallus prodiens (Harm.) Diederich (1989)
- Abrothallus prodiens (Harm.) Clauzade, Diederich & Cl.Roux (1989)
- Abrothallus psoromatis (Zhurb. & U.Braun) Diederich & Zhurb. (2018)
- Abrothallus puntilloi Brackel (2016)
- Abrothallus ramalinae Diederich (2017) – Seychelles
- Abrothallus santessonii (D.Hawksw.) A.Suija, D.Hawksw. & Pérez-Ort. (2018)
- Abrothallus secedens Wedin & R.Sant. (1994) – commensalistic on species of Pseudocyphellaria; from Argentina and Kenya
- Abrothallus stereocaulorum Etayo & Diederich (2002)
- Abrothallus stictarum Etayo (2002) – Colombia
- Abrothallus stroblii Hafellner (2008)
- Abrothallus subhalei Etayo, Flakus & Kukwa (2019)
- Abrothallus suecicus (Kirschst.) Nordin (1964)
- Abrothallus teloschistis Brackel, Pérez-Ortega & Suija (2015)
- Abrothallus tetrasporus (Etayo & Osorio) Etayo, Flakus & Rodr.Flakus (2023)
- Abrothallus tulasnei M.S.Cole & D.Hawksw. (2001) – parasitic on Xanthoparmelia somloensis; from Canada
- Abrothallus usneae Rabenh. (1861)
- Abrothallus welwitschii Mont. (1856)
