= Abrothallus nephromatis =

Scientific classification
- Domain: Eukaryota
- Kingdom: Fungi
- Division: Ascomycota
- Class: Dothideomycetes
- Order: Abrothallales
- Family: Abrothallaceae
- Genus: Abrothallus
- Species: A. nephromatis

Binomial name
- Abrothallus nephromatis Suija & Pérez-Ortega (2015)

Species of fungus

Abrothallus nephromatis is a widely distributed species of lichenicolous fungus in the family Abrothallaceae. It was formally described as a new species in 2015 by Ave Suija and Sergio Pérez-Ortega. The type specimen was collected near Dawson Falls in Wells Gray Provincial Park (British Columbia, Canada) at an elevation of about 800 m (2,600 ft), where it was found on a Nephroma parile lichen that itself was growing on a dead trunk of birch tree. The species epithet refers to the host genus, Nephroma.

Abrothallus nephromatis has been collected from Africa (Tanzania, Uganda); Asia (Russian Far East); Australia and New Zealand; Europe (Italy, Norway, Sweden), Greenland, and North America (Canada, USA). It is distinguished from the similar species Abrothallus boomii by its eight-spored asci and narrower conidia, and from Abrothallus welwitschii by its smaller ascomata and smaller ascospores. The recorded hosts of the fungus are Nephroma parile, N. helveticum, N. rufum, and N. tropicum.
