= Abrothallus canariensis =

Scientific classification
- Kingdom: Fungi
- Division: Ascomycota
- Class: Dothideomycetes
- Order: Abrothallales
- Family: Abrothallaceae
- Genus: Abrothallus
- Species: A. canariensis

Binomial name
- Abrothallus canariensis Pérez-Ortega, van den Boom & Suija (2015)

Species of fungus

Abrothallus canariensis is a species of lichenicolous fungus in the family Abrothallaceae. Found in the Canary Islands, it was formally described as a new species in 2015 by Sergio Pérez-Ortega, Pieter van den Boom, and Ave Suija. The type specimen was collected from Chinobre (Santa Cruz de Tenerife), where it was found on a Pseudocyphellaria aurata lichen that itself was growing on a species of Erica. The species epithet refers to the area of its type locality. The fungus is similar to Abrothallus secedens, but unlike that species, has four-spored asci, and larger ascospores that measure 16–25 by 6–9.5 μm.
