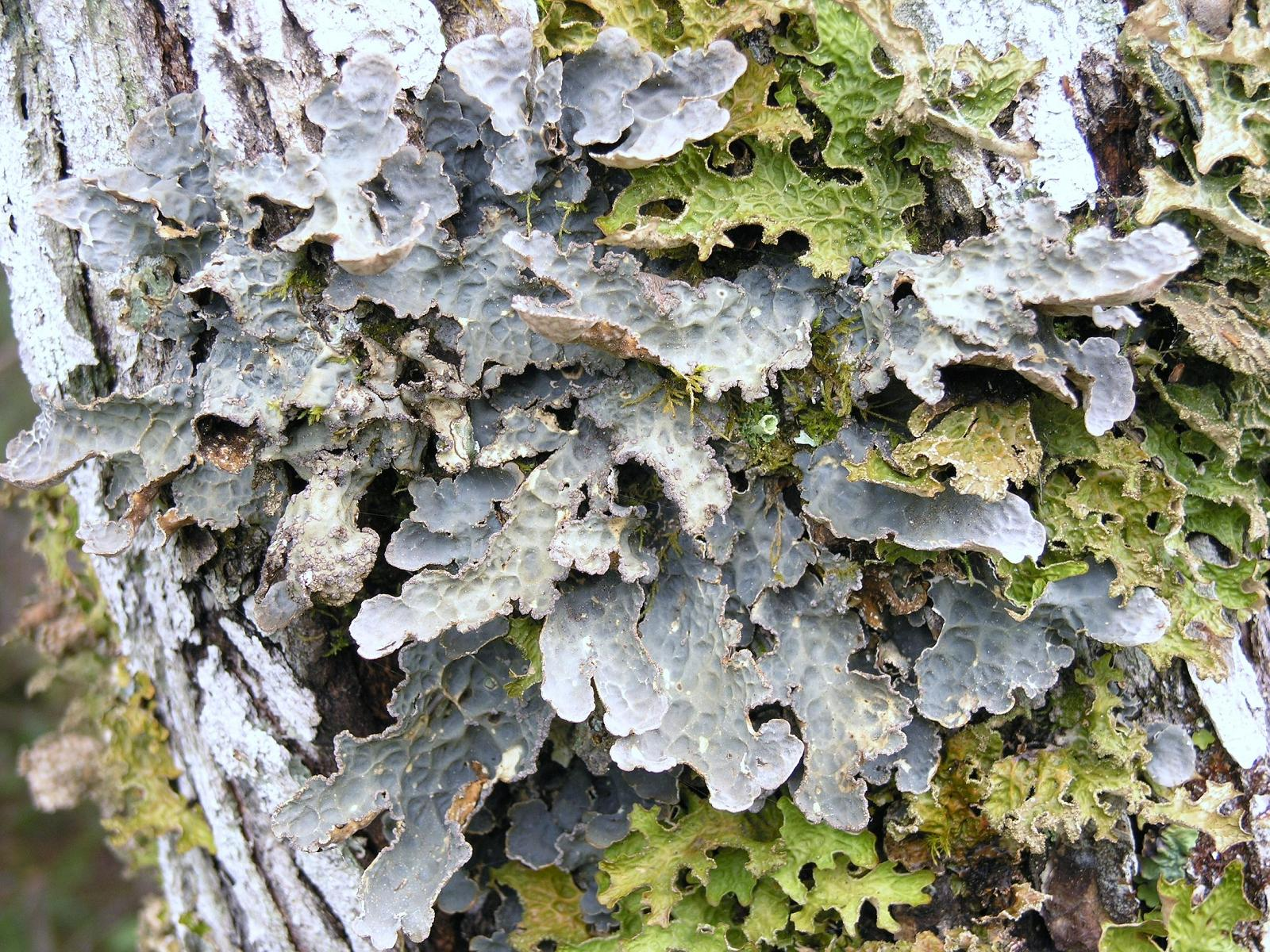
- Lobaria scrobiculata on Acer rubrum (red maple) trunk, New Brunswick, Canada

Conservation status
- Secure (NatureServe)

Scientific classification
- Kingdom: Fungi
- Division: Ascomycota
- Class: Lecanoromycetes
- Order: Peltigerales
- Family: Peltigeraceae
- Genus: Lobaria
- Species: L. scrobiculata

Binomial name
- Lobaria scrobiculata (Scop.) P.Gaertn. (1805)

Synonyms
- Lichen verrucosus Huds. (1762)); Lichen scrobiculatus Scop. (1772); Lobaria verrucosa (Huds.) Hoffm. (1796); Parmelia scrobiculata (Scop.) Ach. (1803); Sticta scrobiculata (Scop.) Ach. (1810); Stictina scrobiculata (Scop.) Nyl. (1861); Lobarina scrobiculata (Scop.) Nyl. (1877); Sticta verrucosa (Huds.) Fink (1935); Stictina verrucosa (Huds.) Szatala (1939); Lobarina verrucosa (Huds.) Gyeln. ex Räsänen (1944); Pseudocyphellaria scrobiculata (Scop.) J.Blum (1975)

= Lobaria scrobiculata =

Species of lichen

Lobaria scrobiculata, commonly known as the textured lungwort, is a large foliose, epiphytic lichen in the family Peltigeraceae.

== Description ==
The thallus of L. scrobiculata has broad, concave and rounded lobes, rather wider than in Lobaria pulmonaria. The upper surface has large shallow depressions (scrobiculate, hence the specific name). Blue-grey soredia, the asexual reproductive bodies, are always present along ridges and on the margins. The thallus has a blue-grey colour and pliable texture when hydrated but assumes a light grey or yellow-grey colour and papery texture when dehydrated. The underside is covered by light brown tomentum and rhizines except on raised areas that correspond to the depressions on the upper surface. Fungal fruit bodies (ascocarps), rarely present, are small dark red discs with a thick inflexed margin. Thallus lobes grow away from the substrate in irregular patches as in L. pulmonaria but unlike the more regular rounded and flattened colonies of L. quercizans, L. amplissima and L. virens. The algal symbiont is the cyanobacterium Nostoc, in contrast to the green algae in most other species of Lobaria.

== Distribution ==
Lobaria scrobiculata is mostly found in temperate climates (Köppen climate classification Cf and Df climates, especially Cfb and Dfb) which have high rainfall, especially coastal districts of north west Europe, north eastern North America and north western North America, but there are also a few known occurrences in warmer countries such as Kenya. The distribution records are possibly very incomplete and biased towards Europe and North America. The map data at www.discoverlife.org shows the worldwide distribution of some of the recorded locations for L. scrobiculata.

In southern England, which may be representative of lowland western Europe, Lobaria species are very restricted in their distribution, in part because of a history of air pollution, forest loss and fragmentation but also because the climate is sub-optimal with relatively low rainfall. In contrast the cool, moist and mountainous regions of north west Scotland have a relatively high frequency of L. scrobiculata on suitable trees.

In Iceland it is found in only one location in the outermost Snæfellsnes Peninsula and is listed as critically endangered (CR).

== Ecology ==
Lobarias are primarily found growing upon tree bark. The type of tree is important with deciduous angiosperms strongly preferred to gymnosperms. Within these angiosperms, rough barked mature trees with relatively high bark pH such as oaks or maples are a more suitable substrate than smooth-barked species such as birches. In the UK sessile oak (Quercus petraea), pedunculate oak (Q. robur) and European ash (Fraxinus excelsior) are the most important. In eastern North America sugar maple (Acer saccharum) and red maple (A. rubrum) are favoured but yellow birch (Betula alleghaniensis) can also be colonised. In the lowlands of southern England the presence of Lobarias is considered indicative of long forest habitat continuity for a particular site. In regions of high rainfall, low air pollution and a higher frequency of suitable habitat the species can be more mobile and able to colonise younger forests and trees but is still generally more prevalent in old-growth forests.

The presence of Lobaria species, along with certain other lichens, has been used as part of an index of forest continuity and habitat quality in Britain.

== Uses ==
The lichen is used for food by the Yupik people of Alaska.
