= Abrothallus halei =

Scientific classification
- Domain: Eukaryota
- Kingdom: Fungi
- Division: Ascomycota
- Class: Dothideomycetes
- Order: Abrothallales
- Family: Abrothallaceae
- Genus: Abrothallus
- Species: A. halei

Binomial name
- Abrothallus halei Pérez-Ort., Suija, D.Hawksw. & R.Sant. (2010)

Species of lichen

Abrothallus halei is a species of lichenicolous (lichen-dwelling) fungus in the family Abrothallaceae. It was formally described as a new species in 2010 by the lichenologists Sergio Pérez-Ortega, Ave Suija, David Leslie Hawksworth, and Rolf Santesson. The type specimen was collected by Cliff Wetmore east of Hare Lake (Superior National Forest, Minnesota) at an elevation of 550 m (1,800 ft); there it was found on the foliose lichen Lobaria quercizans, which itself was growing on the bark of Acer saccharum. The fungus has also been collected in West Virginia, Maine, as well as in Norway. The species epithet honours American lichenologist Mason Hale.

== Description ==
Abrothallus halei forms minute, dome-shaped fruiting bodies (apothecia) that erupt through the surface of its Lobaria host, most often on the lichen's own apothecia. Each measures roughly 0.2–0.55 mm across and about 0.15 mm tall and is frequently pinched in at the base so older examples look faintly stalked. When young the outer surface is cloaked in a vivid olive-green, powdery coating (pruina) that can be lost with age, exposing an underlying black wall.

In vertical section the cup lacks a distinct rim, its wall being made of radiating fungal threads that surround a pale-brown supportive layer (hypothecium). Above this sits the hymenium, a spore-producing tissue about 50 micrometres (μm) tall that is clear below but infused with olive-green pigment granules in the upper part; these granules dissolve in potassium hydroxide solution, a routine diagnostic test. Between the spore sacs run very slender, forked sterile filaments (paraphyses) barely 2 μm thick at the tip. The sacs themselves (asci) are double-walled and fissitunicate, meaning the two walls separate like a telescope when the spores are released. They are club-shaped, 40–60 μm long by 9–12 μm wide and usually hold eight spores.

The brown, ellipsoid spores are initially two-celled but mature into four-celled bodies only 9–14 μm long and 3–5 μm wide. A deep waist at the middle septum allows each mature spore to break neatly into a pair of identical two-celled "part-spores" even while still inside the ascus, a feature unique within the genus. Viewed at high magnification the spore wall is dotted with minute "warts", and no asexual reproductive stage had yet been observed.
