= Abrothallus ertzii =

Scientific classification
- Domain: Eukaryota
- Kingdom: Fungi
- Division: Ascomycota
- Class: Dothideomycetes
- Order: Abrothallales
- Family: Abrothallaceae
- Genus: Abrothallus
- Species: A. ertzii

Binomial name
- Abrothallus ertzii Suija & Pérez-Ortega (2015)

Species of fungus

Abrothallus ertzii is a species of lichenicolous fungus in the family Abrothallaceae. Found in Canada, it was formally described as a new species in 2015 by Ave Suija and Sergio Pérez-Ortega. The type specimen was collected near Dawson Falls in Wells Gray Provincial Park (British Columbia), where it was found growing on the thallus of the foliose lichen Lobaria pulmonaria, which itself was growing on the trunk of a Thuja plicata tree. It has also been collected in Quebec. The species epithet honours Damien Ertz, who collected the type. Abrothallus ertzii is distinguished from other Abrothallus fungi by its clavate (club-shaped) asci that contain eight two-celled ascospores; these readily split into part spores.
