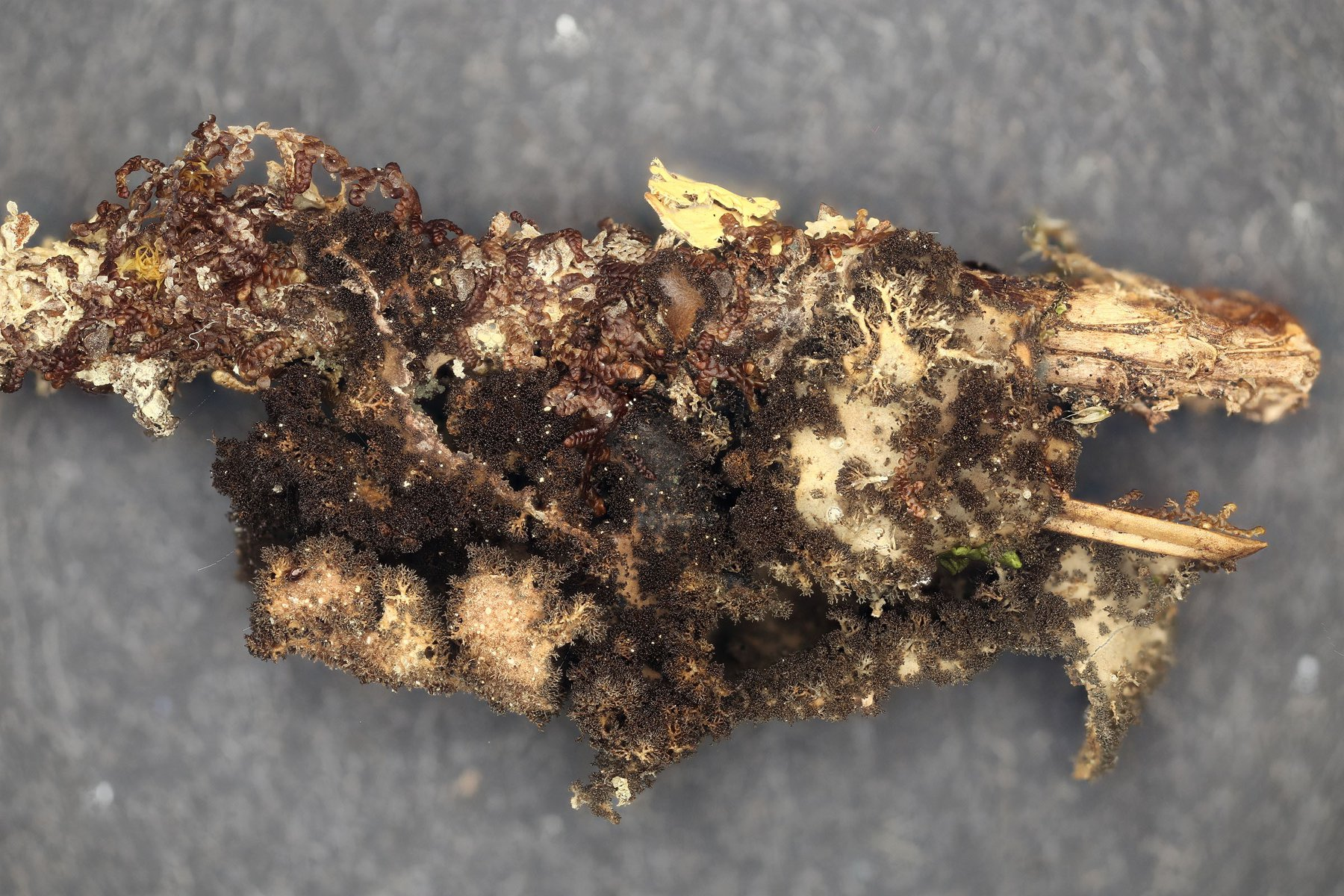

Scientific classification
- Kingdom: Fungi
- Division: Ascomycota
- Class: Lecanoromycetes
- Order: Peltigerales
- Family: Peltigeraceae
- Genus: Sticta
- Species: S. torii

Binomial name
- Sticta torii Ant.Simon & Goward (2018)
- Holotype: Tongass National Forest, Alaska, USA

= Sticta torii =

Species of lichen

Sticta torii is a rare species of corticolous (bark-dwelling), lichen in the family Peltigeraceae. Found in northwestern North America, it was formally described as a new species in 2018 by the lichenologists Antoine Simon and Trevor Goward, from specimens collected in Alaska. The species epithet honours the Norwegian lichenologist Tor Tønsberg, "in recognition of his outstanding, vigorous contribution to lichenology".

== Description ==
Sticta torii is a lichen with cyanobacteria (genus Nostoc) as its primary photosynthetic partner. It lacks a stalk and has an irregular thallus that can grow up to 1.5–2.0 cm in diameter. Initially single-lobed, it eventually becomes multi-lobed and is quite fragile. The lobes are rounded to elongate, often ascending but sometimes curving downward at the tips, and are imbricate (overlapping like roof tiles). Secondary lobes can be involute (rolled inward), with margins sometimes featuring lacerate (torn) outgrowths of isidia (small, finger-like reproductive propagules). The upper surface is smooth, gray to dark brown, and may be matt or somewhat shiny, with occasional sparse maculae (spots) near the tips.

Isidia are present and abundant, primarily along the margins but also on the surface, growing into branching, tree-like structures up to 0.6 mm long. The medulla (inner layer) is compact and white. The lower surface is even and cream to brown-colored, with dense tomentum (hairy layer) that becomes sparser toward the margin.

Sticta torii has no rhizines (root-like structures) but features sparse cyphellae (small, pore-like structures) scattered throughout, which are rounded to irregular with wide pores. The upper cortex is 25–55 μm thick, consisting of 2–4 layers of cells. The photobiont layer is 35–65 μm thick, while the medulla is 110–240 μm thick. The lower cortex is 25–45 μm thick, also with 3–4 cell layers. The lower tomentum consists of unbranched, cylindrical hyphae in bundles, with occasional moniliform (rosary-like) appearance near the margins.

== Habitat and distribution ==
Sticta torii grows on the outermost branches of Alnus rubra (red alder), Malus fusca (Pacific crabapple), and Picea sitchensis (Sitka spruce) in coastal areas exposed to storms and the open ocean. This lichen is restricted to hypermaritime regions where winter temperatures rarely drop below freezing. The Alaskan habitat has been ice-free for about 16,000 years BP. In British Columbia, Sticta torii coexists with other epiphytic lichens such as Arctomia borbonica, Cavernularia hultenii, Collema furfuraceum, Erioderma sorediatum, Fuscopannaria laceratula, F. leucostictoides, Lobaria anomala, Lobaria anthraspis, Nephroma laevigatum, Pannaria malmei, Pseudocyphellaria mallota, P. hawaiiensis, Sticta limbata, and Usnea longissima.

Two paratype specimens from British Columbia were collected from the same locality in different years on dwarfed Picea sitchensis branches at a sheltered, north-facing site just above the high-tide line on a small rocky islet. These islets, which provide roosting sites for migratory passerine birds such as warblers, kinglets, and sparrows, may contribute to the presence of Sticta torii in these areas despite extensive searches elsewhere.
