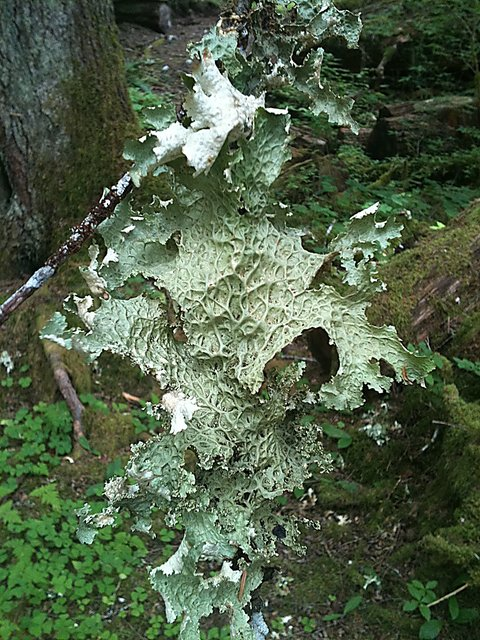
- Lobaria oregana in the Hoh Rainforest

Conservation status
- Secure (NatureServe)

Scientific classification
- Kingdom: Fungi
- Division: Ascomycota
- Class: Lecanoromycetes
- Order: Peltigerales
- Family: Peltigeraceae
- Genus: Lobaria
- Species: L. oregana

Binomial name
- Lobaria oregana (Tuck.) Müll.Arg. (1889)

Synonyms
- Sticta oregana Tuck. (1874)

= Lobaria oregana =

Species of lichen

Lobaria oregana, also known as lettuce lichen and as Oregon lungwort, is a species of foliose lichen occurring in North American old-growth forests, such as the Hoh Rainforest in Washington state. Taking its common name from its lettuce-like appearance, the lichen grows in the tree canopy but falls to the forest floor, where it is consumed by deer, elk, and other animals. The species was first described by American botanist Edward Tuckerman in 1874 as Sticta oregana, and later (1889) transferred to the genus Lobaria by Swiss lichen specialist Johannes Müller Argoviensis. Via cyanobacteria, it fixes nitrogen from the air, which then enters the local ecosystem when eaten or when absorbed by rootlets which the host trees extend from their own bark into the lichen.

== History ==
Very little is known about the history of this lichen and its uses, beyond remedying the coughing of blood by the Hesquiat people of British Columbia. The Latin word lobaria means "lobed”.

== Description ==
This lichen is a loosely attached leaf lichen. It is large, with broad lobes. Size ranges from 20mm to 35mm wide. Its upper surface is yellowish-green, and its lower surface is pale brown with fine hairs, and scattered pale, yellowish, hair free patches. This lichen has strong and deeply indented ridges. It has no soredia or isidia. The lobe margins are frilly. The frills at the end of the lobes are small.

== Habitat and range ==
This lichen prefers to grow on large coniferous trees; especially Douglas Firs, in forests. This lichen prefers growing on Douglas Fir so much that it makes up about 5% of the weight of foliage on Douglas Fir trees. It prefers cool places, and is sensitive to living in areas that are about approximately 15 degrees Celsius. This niche prefers the coastline because of its cooler temperatures along the western side of the United States. It is often found to the west of the Cascade Mountain Range, and not to the east. This lichen spans from Southern Oregon and northern California up into Alaska, around and into the Kenai Peninsula. Due to its preferences for cool, wet climates, it does not reach very far into the Alaskan or Canadian interior. This lichen prefers very humid climates that are cool year round. This lichen is very particular and seems to grow only in old growth forests, although it appears to be going fast in many parts of its range. The lichen prefers middle elevations, and although it spans west from the Cascade and Alaskan Mountains to the ocean, it is most commonly found on the Coastal range. Although it is very rare for this species to drift far from the cool, humid west coastline, the farthest east sighting was in 2012, where two people reported seeing Lobaria Oregana in a forest near Usk, Washington. The farthest south sighting of Lobaria Oregana is in California, where one person saw the species in 2015 near Westpett, California. The farthest North sighting of this lichen was in 2017, south from Indian, Alaska across the Turnagain Arm. Lobaria Oregana grows about 30% of its size every year. Lobaria Oregana dominates the epiphyte community in its preferred habitat, its biomass covers about 10–15 kg per tree, which is greater than all other epiphyte species combined. It prefers living on the twigs and branches, of trees, than on the trunks. On average, this species took up 3.1 kg of dry weight on the branches of trees, and 7.1 kg of dry weight on the twigs of trees. If there is an assumed 12.5 kg of biomass per tree, and there are 40 mature trees per hectare, there are about 500 kg/ha of dry weight. Lobaria Oregana can absorb 2.7 g of water per g of dry thallus, then the dry population of 500 kg/ha reaches up to two metric tons of wet weight per hectare.

== Nitrogen fixing ==
This species of lichen, along with Lobaria pulmonaria are two of the most important lichens in old growth forests of the Pacific Northwest and Southeast Alaska. The two species together account for between 35-60% of all epiphytes in forests of the Pacific Northwest. They also account for about 5% of the foliar biomass, and 56% of the total epiphyte nitrogen content. It is estimates that Lobaria Oregana fixes roughly 3 to 4 kg of N per hectare per year. The transfer of nitrogen that Lobaria Oregana fixes the forest floor is by litter fall, decomposition, and by leaching off of other intact lichens. The two greatest factors on the rate of nitrogen fixation are moisture and temperature, light indirectly affects this rate. The higher the amount of water that the lichen has absorbed, the more nitrogen it will fix. There is very little in between with how much nitrogen is fixed by this lichen, because it is always either found highly saturated, or very dry, because of its rapid use of water, and because of the high concentration of water in the air. Within the temperature range of 0-15 degrees Celsius, the lichen was able to fix more nitrogen with increased temperatures. Light does not play a large role in the amount of nitrogen fixed because Lobaria Oregana gains most of its energy from photosynthesis, and is therefore secondarily light dependent.

== Conservation ==
This lichen is common outside of old-growth forests, but it is most often found within such forests. It is not listed as endangered, and is very abundant is some areas, although it is speculated that due to forest fragmentation and harvesting, this species could be threatened in certain areas. There are very little occurrences of Lobaria Oregana in young forests, and it grows very slowly in these young forests, especially if the forest was disturbed particularly from logging. It is sensitive to air pollution.
