= Abrothallus etayoi =

Scientific classification
- Domain: Eukaryota
- Kingdom: Fungi
- Division: Ascomycota
- Class: Dothideomycetes
- Order: Abrothallales
- Family: Abrothallaceae
- Genus: Abrothallus
- Species: A. etayoi

Binomial name
- Abrothallus etayoi Pérez-Ortega & Suija (2015)

Species of fungus

Abrothallus etayoi is a species of lichenicolous fungus in the family Abrothallaceae. Found in Mexico, it was formally described as a new species in 2015 by Ave Suija and Sergio Pérez-Ortega. The type specimen was collected from Angahuan (Michoacán) at an elevation of 2,470 m (8,100 ft); there, in a pine-oak forest, it was found growing on a Sticta lichen that itself was growing on oak. The species epithet honours Spanish lichenologist Javier Etayo, "a keen collector of lichenicolous fungi and lichens".

Abrothallus etayoi differs from other Abrothallus fungi by the shape of its pycnidia (barrel-shaped to somewhat spherical), and by its single-celled conidia that measure 11–17.5 by 7–11 μm. Although known only from the type locality, the authors suggest that the fungus may have a wider distribution in Mexico due to the prevalence of the ecosystem from which it was collected.
