= Abrothallus granulatae =

Scientific classification
- Domain: Eukaryota
- Kingdom: Fungi
- Division: Ascomycota
- Class: Dothideomycetes
- Order: Abrothallales
- Family: Abrothallaceae
- Genus: Abrothallus
- Species: A. granulatae

Binomial name
- Abrothallus granulatae Wedin (1994)

Species of lichen

Abrothallus granulatae is a species of lichenicolous fungus in the family Abrothallaceae. Found in South America, it was formally described as a new species in 1994 by Swedish lichenologist Mats Wedin. The type specimen was collected by the author on the eastern shore of Lago Roca in Tierra del Fuego National Park (Patagonia, Argentina), where it was found on the thallus of the foliose lichen Pseudocyphellaria granulata, which itself was growing on the base of a dead Nothofagus tree. The species epithet of the fungus refers to the epithet of its host lichen. The anamorph form of the fungus was concurrently named Vouauxiomyces granulatae. Characteristics of the fungus include the dense clusters formed by its apothecia, and its 2-septate ascospores. Abrothallus granulatae has also been collected in Chile.
