= Abrothallus eriodermae =

Scientific classification
- Domain: Eukaryota
- Kingdom: Fungi
- Division: Ascomycota
- Class: Dothideomycetes
- Order: Abrothallales
- Family: Abrothallaceae
- Genus: Abrothallus
- Species: A. eriodermae

Binomial name
- Abrothallus eriodermae Suija, Etayo & Pérez-Ortega (2015)

Species of fungus

Abrothallus eriodermae is a species of lichenicolous fungus in the family Abrothallaceae. Found in Alaska, South America, Jamaica, and Réunion island, it was formally described as a new species in 2015 by Ave Suija, Javier Etayo, and Sergio Pérez-Ortega. The type specimen was collected from the Bébour forest in La Reunion, growing on Erioderma papyraceum. It has also been recorded on Erioderma chilense, E. sorediatum, and E. wrightii. The species epithet refers to the host genus Erioderma.
