= Abrothallus doliiformis =

Scientific classification
- Domain: Eukaryota
- Kingdom: Fungi
- Division: Ascomycota
- Class: Dothideomycetes
- Order: Abrothallales
- Family: Abrothallaceae
- Genus: Abrothallus
- Species: A. doliiformis

Binomial name
- Abrothallus doliiformis Pérez-Ortega & Suija (2015)

Species of fungus

Abrothallus doliiformis is a species of lichenicolous fungus in the family Abrothallaceae. Found in Peru, it was formally described as a new species in 2015 by Ave Suija and Sergio Pérez-Ortega. The type specimen was collected from Machu Picchu (Department of Cuzco) at an elevation of 2,484 m (8,150 ft), where it was growing on the thallus of an unidentified Sticta lichen. It is only known to occur at the type locality. The species epithet doliiformis refers to its doliiform (barrel-shaped) pycnidia. This feature, along with its hyaline, single-celled conidia (measuring 9.5–14.5 by 6–9.5 μm) distinguish it from other Abrothallus fungi.
