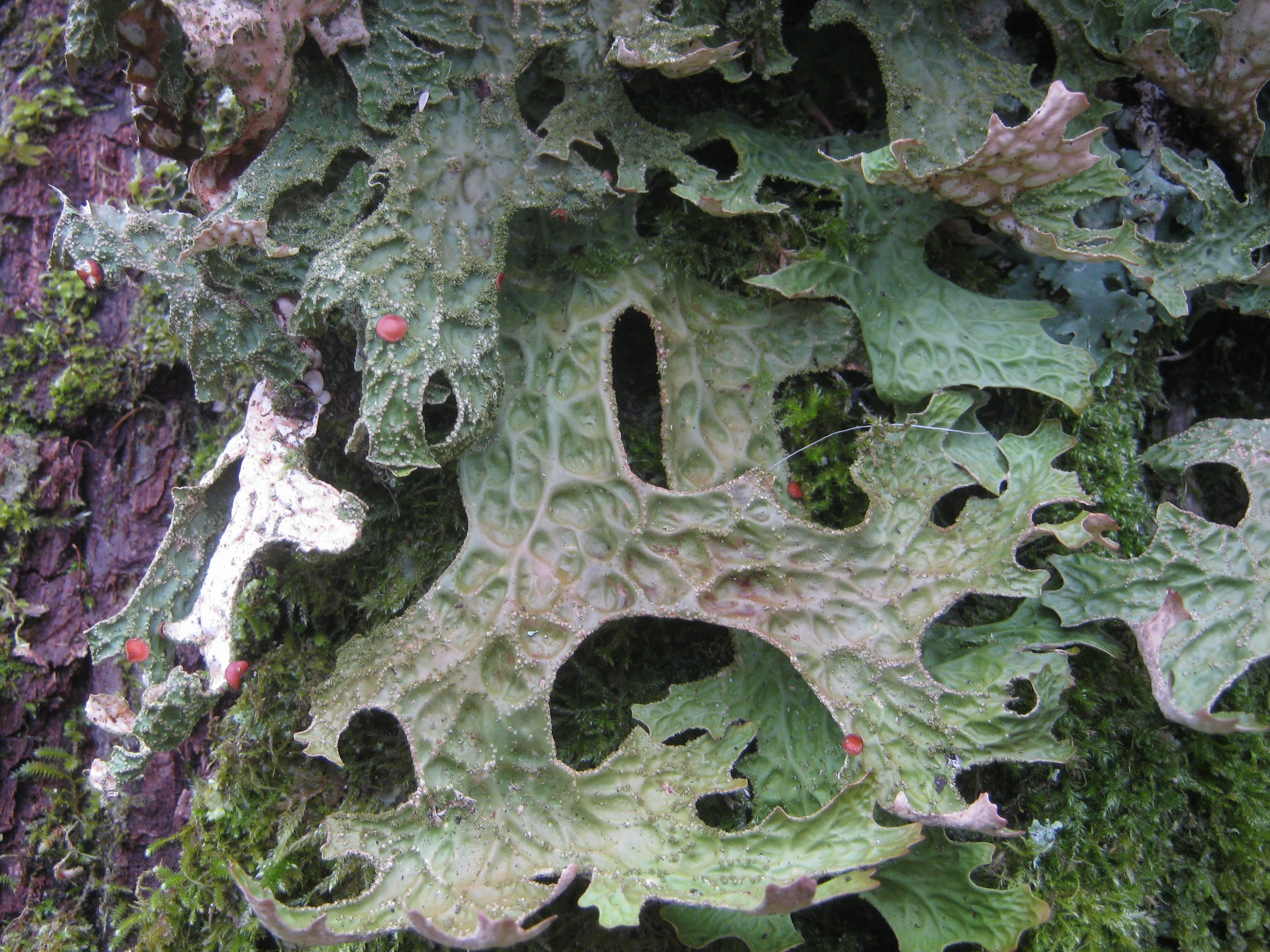

Scientific classification
- Domain: Eukaryota
- Kingdom: Fungi
- Division: Ascomycota
- Class: Lecanoromycetes
- Order: Peltigerales
- Family: Peltigeraceae
- Genus: Lobaria
- Species: L. macaronesica

Binomial name
- Lobaria macaronesica C.Cornejo & Scheid. (2010)

= Lobaria macaronesica =

Species of lichen

Lobaria macaronesica is a species of foliose lichen in the family Peltigeraceae. Found in Macaronesia, it was formally described as a new species in 2010 by Carolina Cornejo and Christoph Scheidegger. The type specimen was collected on Madeira (Portugal), south of the Ribeira da Janela, at an elevation of 1,225 m (4,019 ft).

== Description ==
The lichen has a foliose (leafy) thallus that is bright green (when wet) to olive brown (when dry), measuring up to 15 cm (6 in) in diameter and comprising oblong lobes. The thallus surface is marked with ridges and pits, with rounded axils and truncated tips. Isidia occur singly or in small groups, and are cylindrical to sausage-shaped, up to 3 mm long. Apothecia occur infrequently in this species; when present, they are usually situated along the lobe edges or along upper surface ridges, and are reddish-brown with an entire margin. The ascospores are hyaline with three septa, measuring about 20 by 8 μm.

The expected results of standard lichen spot tests are: medulla C−, K+ (yellow to red), P+ (yellow). Lobaria macaronesica contains the secondary chemicals norstictic acid, stictic acid, and constictic acid.

A real-time polymerase chain reaction assay has been developed that will distinguish between Lobaria pulmonaria, L. immixta and L. macaronesica.

== Habitat and distribution ==
Lobaria macaronesica grows as an epiphyte on trees and shrubs found in subtropical laurel forests, including Laurus azorica, Persea indica, Pittosporum coriaceum, Vaccinium cylindricum, Myrica faya, Ilex canariensis, and Erica arborea. It is usually encountered in montane cloud forests at altitudes between 300 and 1,500 m (980 and 4,920 ft).
