= Hoh Rainforest =

Temperate Rainforest in the Olympic Peninsula

Coordinates: 47°51′41.2″N 123°55′28.8″W

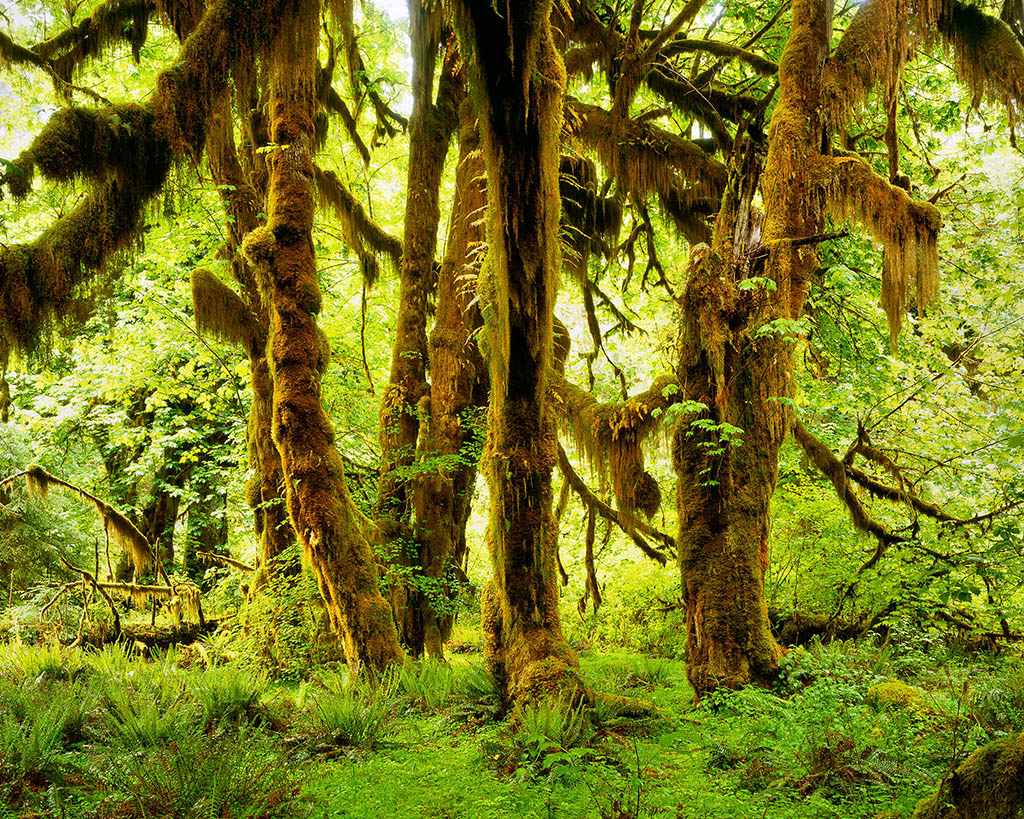
Bigleaf maples in the Hoh Rainforest

Hoh Rainforest is one of the largest temperate rainforests in the United States, located on the Olympic Peninsula in western Washington state. It encompasses 24 square miles (62 km^{2}) of low elevation forest along the Hoh River, ranging from 394 to 2,493 feet (120 to 760 m). The rainforest receives an average of 140 inches (360 cm) of annual precipitation—among the rainiest places in the United States. The Hoh River valley was formed thousands of years ago by glaciers and is the ancestral home of the Hoh people.

Within Olympic National Park, the forest is protected from commercial exploitation. Between the park boundary and the Pacific Ocean, 48 km (30 mi) of river, much of the forest has been logged within the last century, although many pockets of forest remain. According to the National Park Service, in 2024 approximately 460,000 people visited the Hoh District, which includes the rainforest and its visitor center.

The protected portion of the forest includes the "One Square Inch of Silence", a 1-square-inch (6.5 cm^{2}) monument to mark what it deems the "quietest place in the United States". It was placed in 2005 as part of a demonstration in favor of noise control.

== History ==
Hoh Rainforest, Washington (U.S. State)

Climate chart (precipitation, max. and min. temperature)
J	F	M	A	M	J	J	A	S	O	N	D
631 5 1	297 7 1	367 8 1	261 13 3	147 16 6	94 18 9	57 22 10	80 22 11	162 19 9	257 13 5	530 8 2	362 5 0
- █ Average max. and min. temperatures in °C
- █ Precipitation totals in mm
Imperial conversion
J	F	M	A	M	J	J	A	S	O	N	D
25 41 33	12 44 33	14 47 34	10 55 37	5.8 61 43	3.7 64 47	2.2 72 51	3.1 71 51	6.4 67 47	10 55 41	21 46 36	14 40 33
- █ Average max. and min. temperatures in °F
- █ Precipitation totals in inches

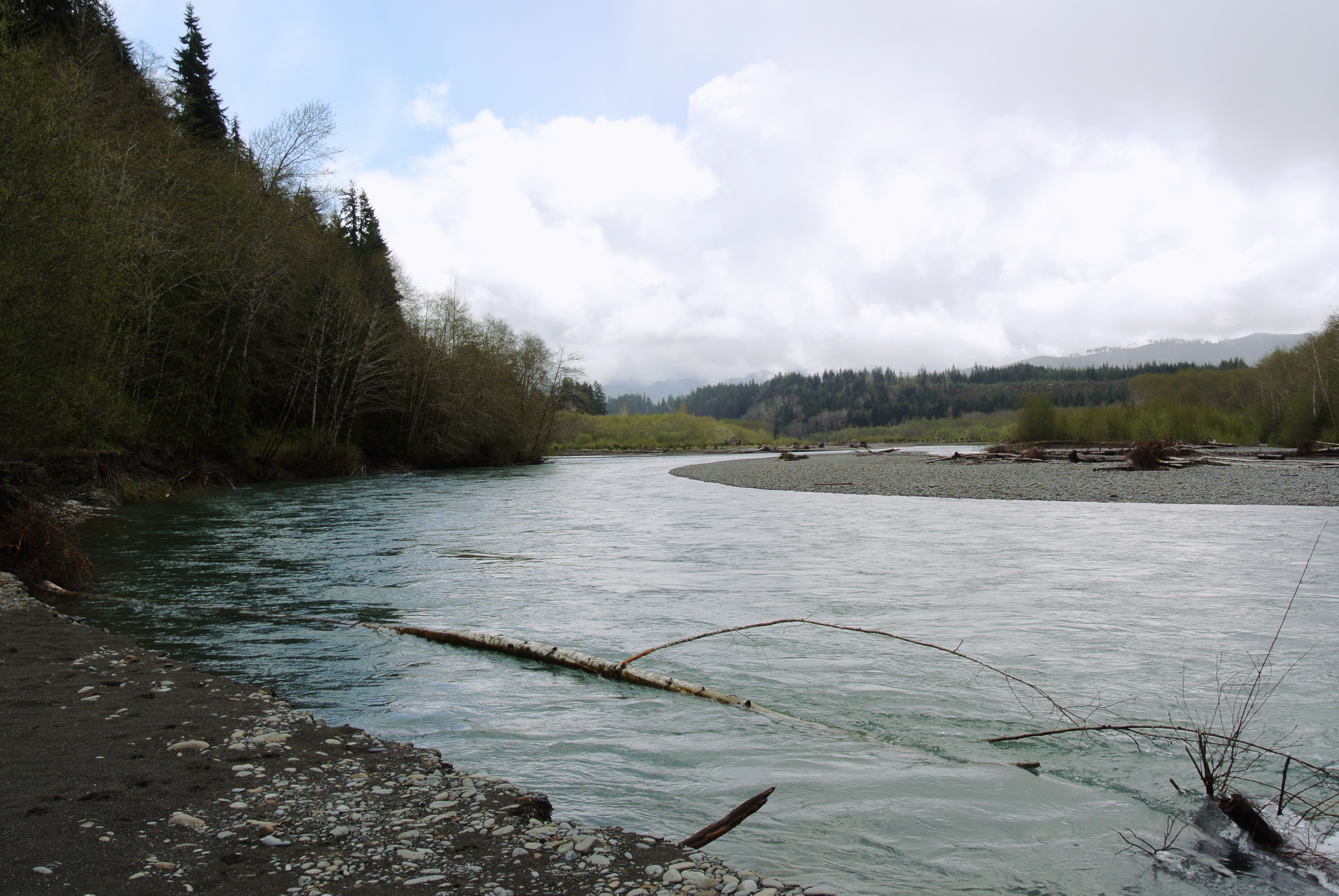
The eponymous Hoh River

On December 20, 2024, the Jefferson County government announced the closure of the Upper Hoh Road—the only vehicular access to the rainforest and visitors center—after flooding of the Hoh River had washed out portions of the road. The embankment separating the road from the Hoh River had been weakened by a major bomb cyclone a month earlier that eroded and saturated the soil.

Portions of the road that had been damaged or destroyed in previous winter storms and floods had been repaired and reopened using emergency federal funding, but the mass layoffs and disruption to federal services beginning in early 2025 led to an uncertain timeline.

Washington Governor Bob Ferguson announced in March 2025 that the state government would fund the majority of the estimated $650,000 in repairs to the Upper Hoh Road, with the remainder from more than 100 private donors. The state government's $623,000 portion was derived from an economic strategic reserve fund that includes unclaimed lottery prize money and requires a portion of the total cost to be covered by private contributions.

The Upper Hoh Road was fully repaired by May 5 and reopened to traffic on May 8, restoring public access to the visitors center.

== Climate ==
Hoh Rainforest is the wettest forest in the Contiguous United States, receiving 129 inches (3,300 mm) of rain per year. It is a Warm-summer Mediterranean climate (Köppen climate classification: Csb), as it receives significantly higher precipitation during winter than in summer.

Climate data for Hoh Ranger Station, Olympic National Park, Washington
Month	Jan	Feb	Mar	Apr	May	Jun	Jul	Aug	Sep	Oct	Nov	Dec	Year
Record high °F (°C)	54 (12)	62 (17)	69 (21)	86 (30)	87 (31)	93 (34)	94 (34)	93 (34)	88 (31)	71 (22)	58 (14)	53 (12)	94 (34)
Mean daily maximum °F (°C)	40.8 (4.9)	44.3 (6.8)	47.1 (8.4)	54.8 (12.7)	61.1 (16.2)	63.9 (17.7)	71.6 (22.0)	71.5 (21.9)	66.6 (19.2)	55.2 (12.9)	46.3 (7.9)	40.2 (4.6)	55.3 (12.9)
Mean daily minimum °F (°C)	33.5 (0.8)	33.0 (0.6)	34.0 (1.1)	37.1 (2.8)	42.6 (5.9)	47.4 (8.6)	50.7 (10.4)	51.2 (10.7)	47.4 (8.6)	41.2 (5.1)	36.0 (2.2)	32.7 (0.4)	40.6 (4.8)
Record low °F (°C)	12 (−11)	20 (−7)	23 (−5)	28 (−2)	26 (−3)	31 (−1)	39 (4)	38 (3)	37 (3)	27 (−3)	18 (−8)	17 (−8)	12 (−11)
Average precipitation inches (mm)	24.86 (631)	11.70 (297)	14.45 (367)	10.27 (261)	6.30 (160)	3.72 (94)	2.60 (66)	3.67 (93)	7.07 (180)	10.12 (257)	20.88 (530)	14.27 (362)	129.91 (3,298)
Average snowfall inches (cm)	7.7 (20)	7.6 (19)	2.7 (6.9)	0.7 (1.8)	0.0 (0.0)	0.0 (0.0)	0.0 (0.0)	0.0 (0.0)	0.0 (0.0)	0.0 (0.0)	2.3 (5.8)	6.5 (17)	27.5 (70.5)

== Flora ==
The dominant species in the rainforest are Sitka spruce (Picea sitchensis) and western hemlock (Tsuga heterophylla); some grow to tremendous size, reaching over 300 feet (91 m) in height and 23 ft (7.0 m) in diameter. Coast Douglas-fir (Pseudotsuga menziesii var. menziesii), western red cedar (Thuja plicata), bigleaf maple (Acer macrophyllum), red alder (Alnus rubra), vine maple (Acer circinatum), and black cottonwood (Populus trichocarpa) are also found throughout the forest.

Many unique mosses and lichens are also present in the rainforest, such as lettuce lichen (Lobaria oregana), which "requires the cool, moist conditions found under the canopy of old-growth forests" and is consumed by deer, elk, and other animals. Ferns like the Western Sword fern (Polystichum munitum) also grow in the rainforest.

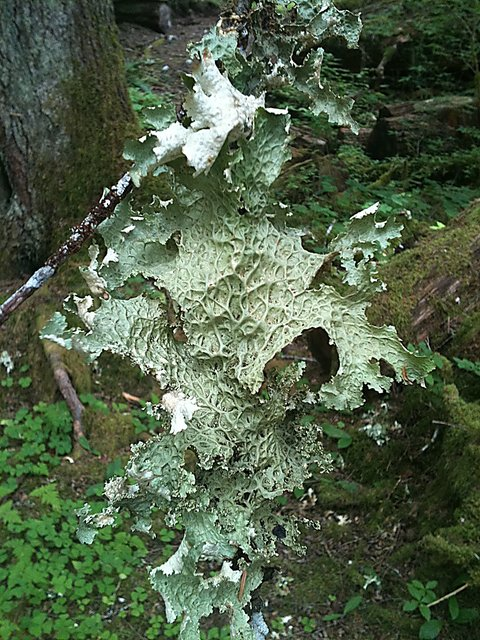
Lobaria oregana on the forest floor

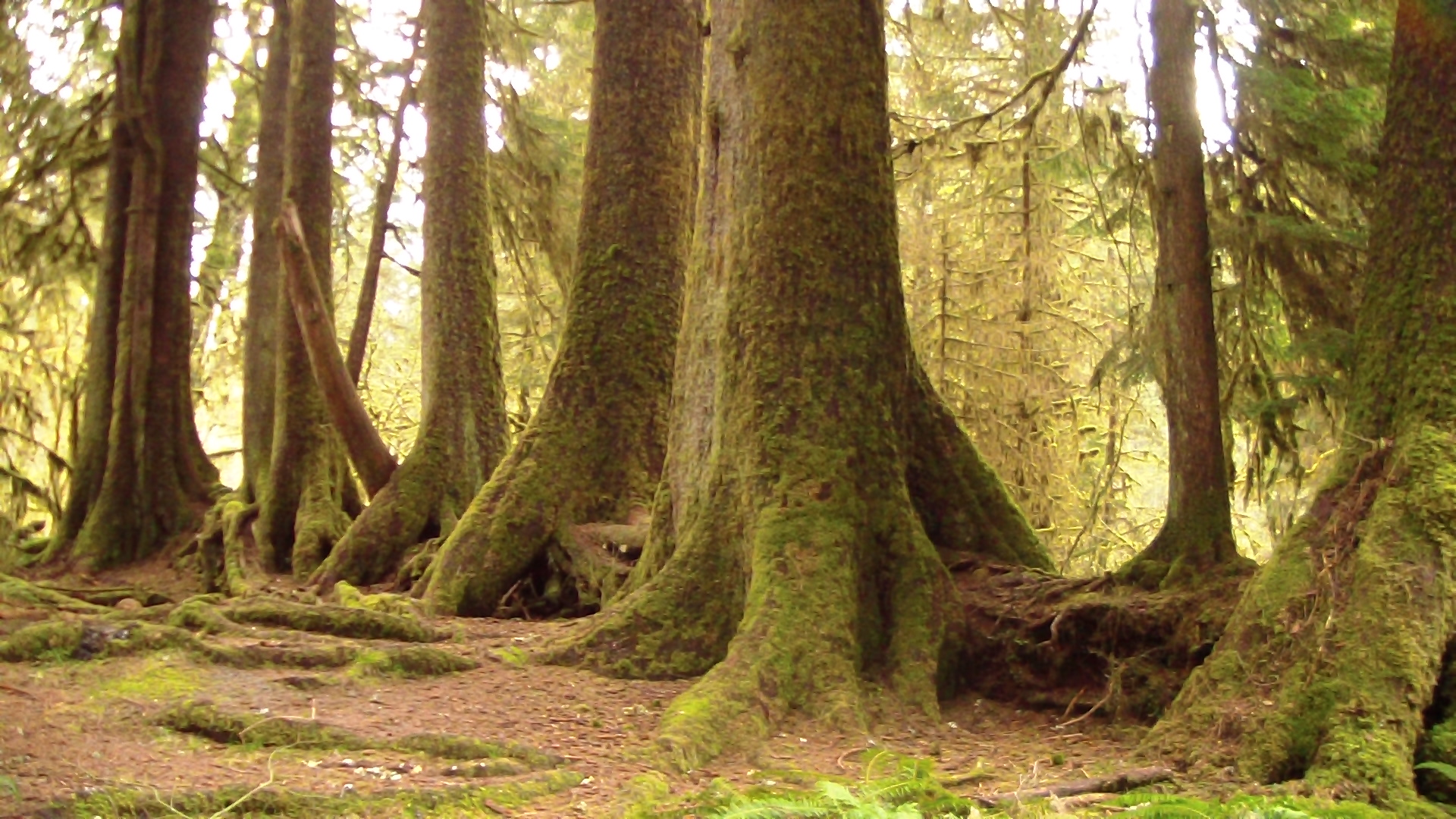
A nurse log providing nutrients for other growing trees

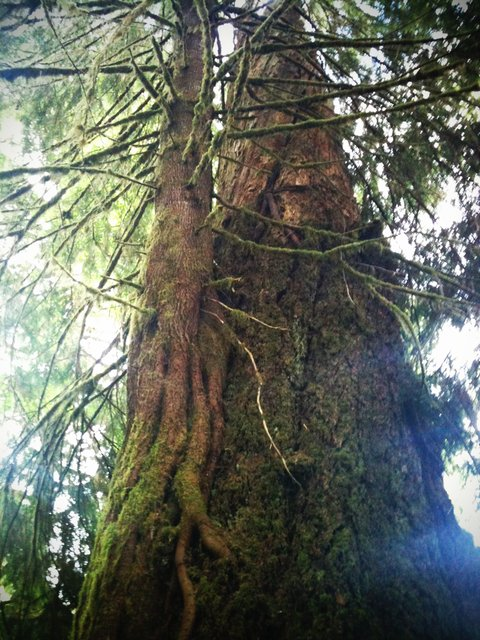
Young western hemlock growing as an epiphyte on an older tree

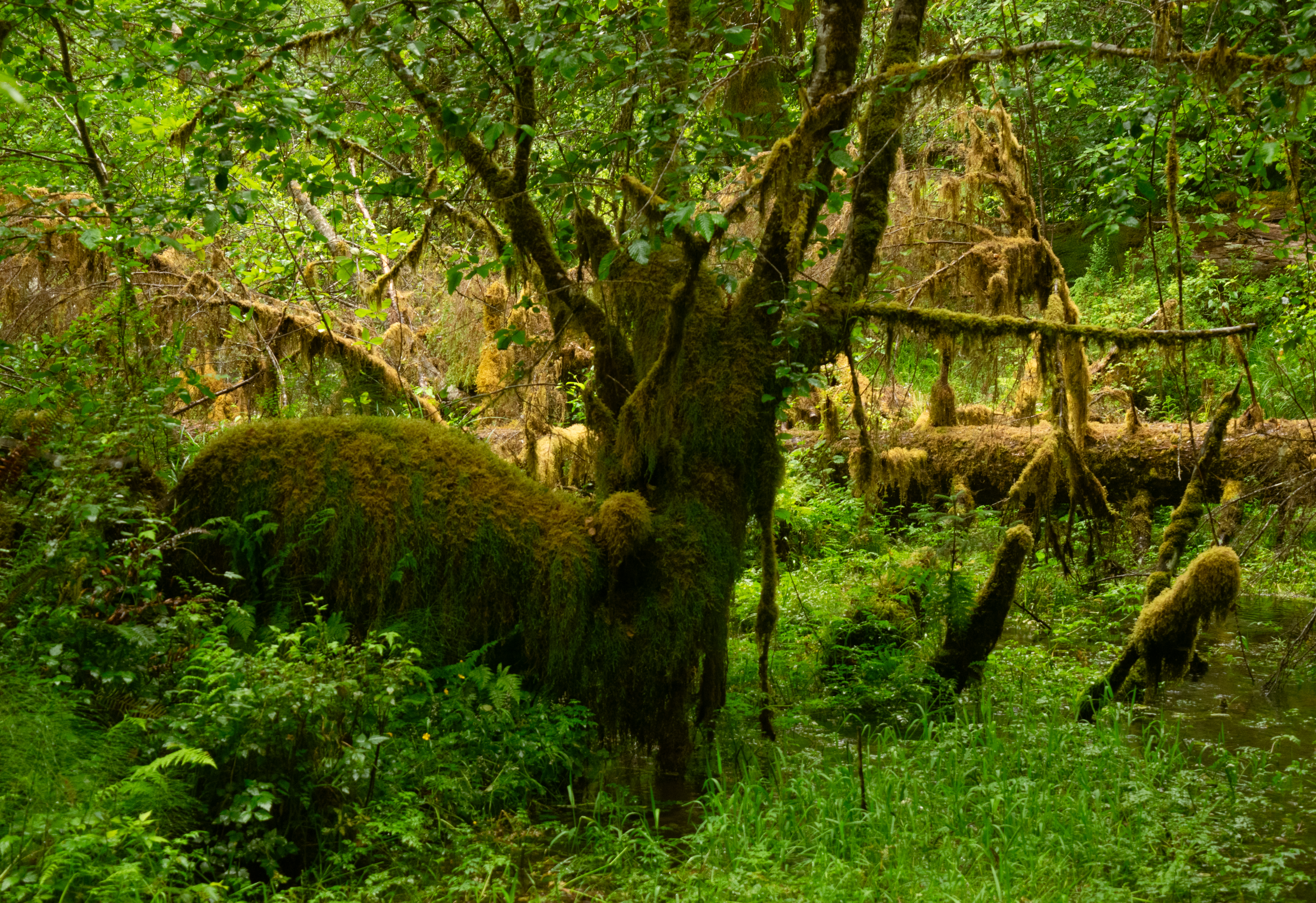
Maple tree

== Fauna ==
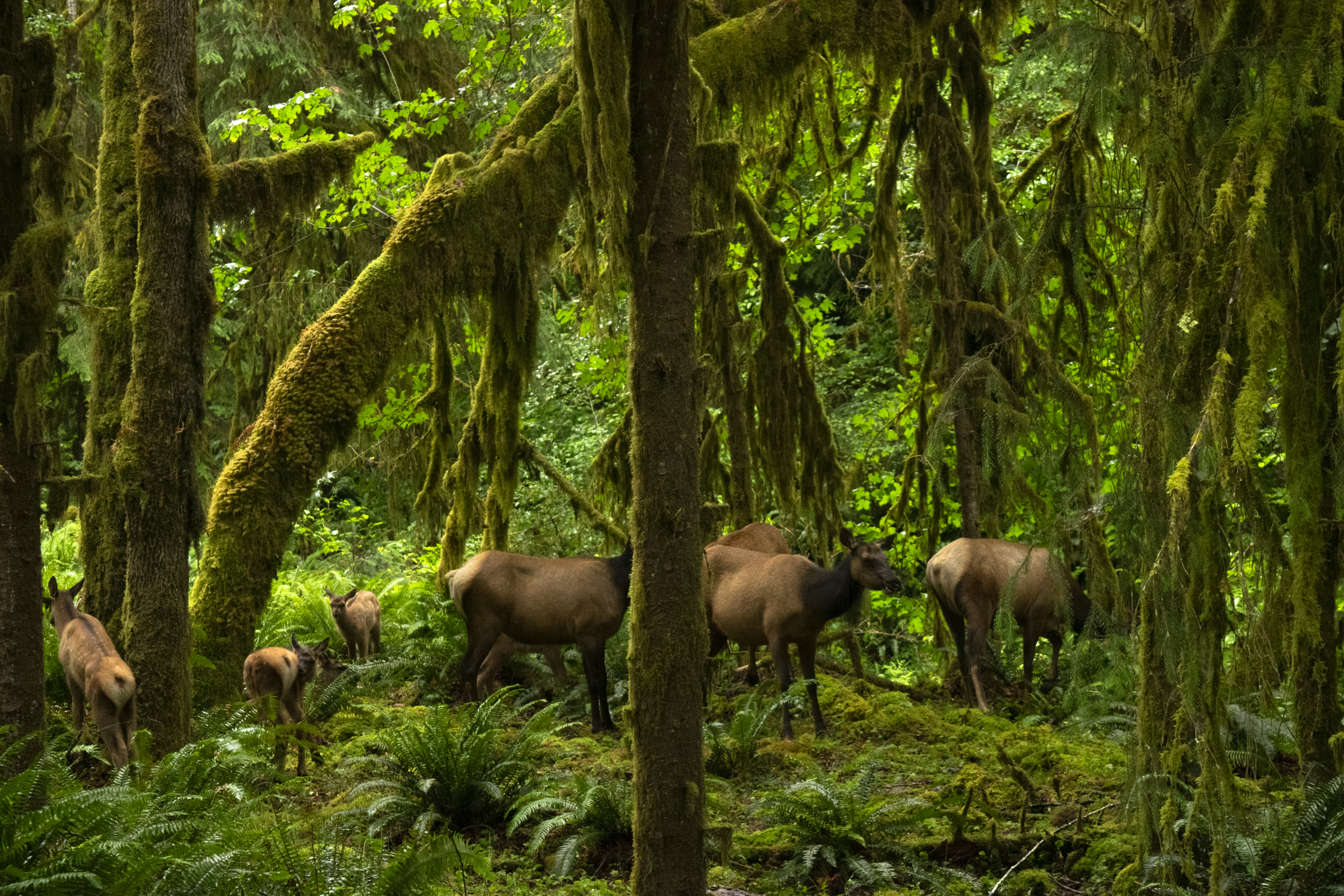
A herd of Roosevelt Elk grazing

Native fauna include the Pacific tree frog (Pseudacris regilla), northern spotted owl (Strix occidentalis caurina), bobcat (Lynx rufus), cougar (Puma concolor cougar), raccoon (Procyon lotor), Olympic black bear (Ursus americanus altifrontalis), Roosevelt elk (Cervus canadensis roosevelti), coyote (Canis latrans), Cascade red fox (Vulpes vulpes), and black-tailed deer (Odocoileus columbianus). Recently, naturalists have been planning on reintroducing fishers to the forest and surrounding forests due to their almost extirpated population in Washington and the introduced Virginia opossum is beginning to make way to the region in and around the forest.

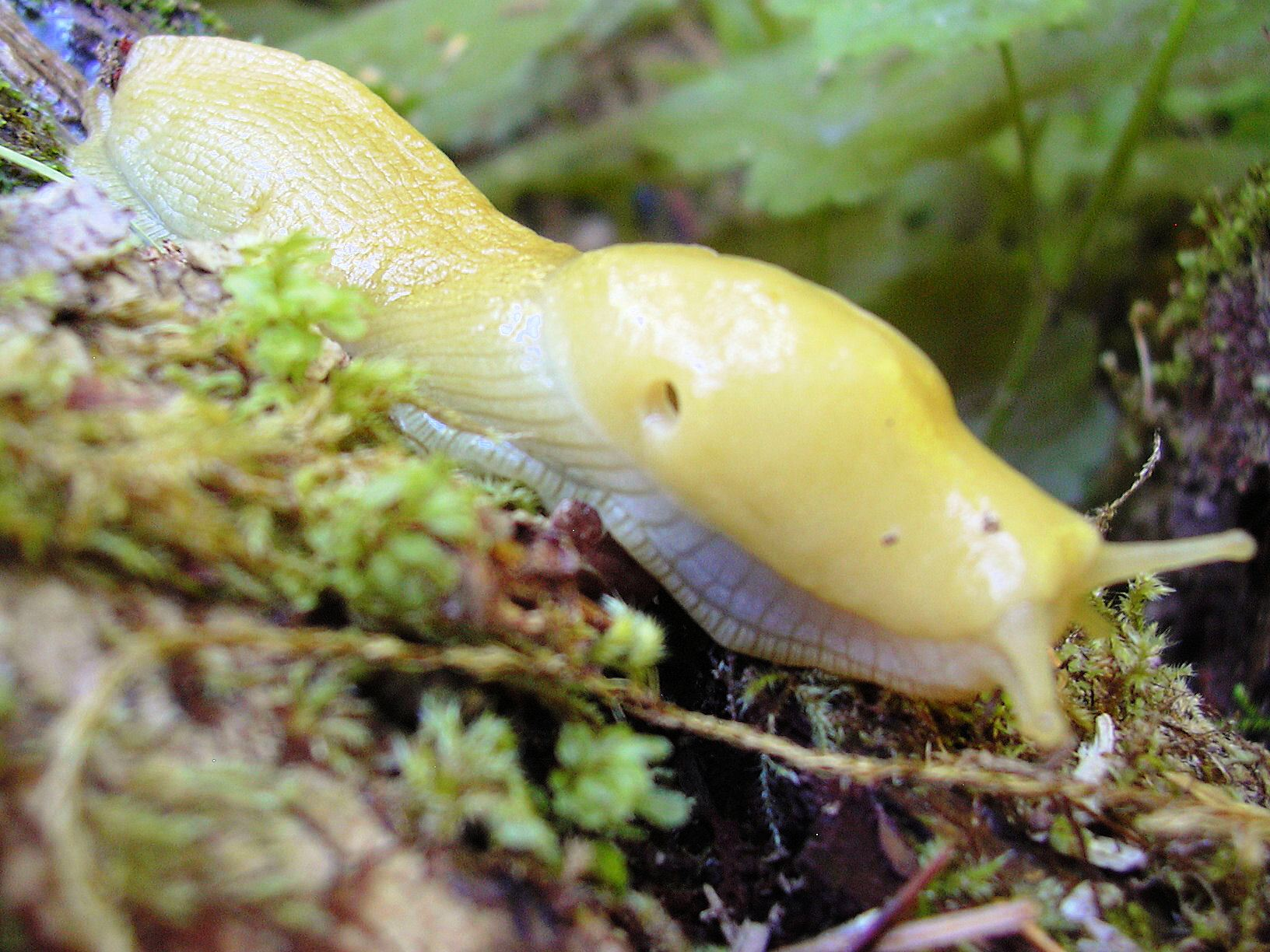
Banana slug

The area is also home to the banana slug (Ariolimax columbianus), which has recently been threatened by the encroachment of a new species of slug, the black slug (Arion ater), an invasive species from Northern Europe.

== Trails ==
The Hoh Rainforest is home to a National Park Service ranger station, from which backcountry trails extend deeper into the national park.

Near the visitor center is the Hall of Mosses Trail, a short trail—0.8 miles (1.3 km)— which gives visitors a feel for the local ecosystem and views of maples draped with large growths of spikemoss. There is also the Spruce Nature Trail (1.2 miles (1.9 km)), which includes signs that identify various trailside trees and plants.
