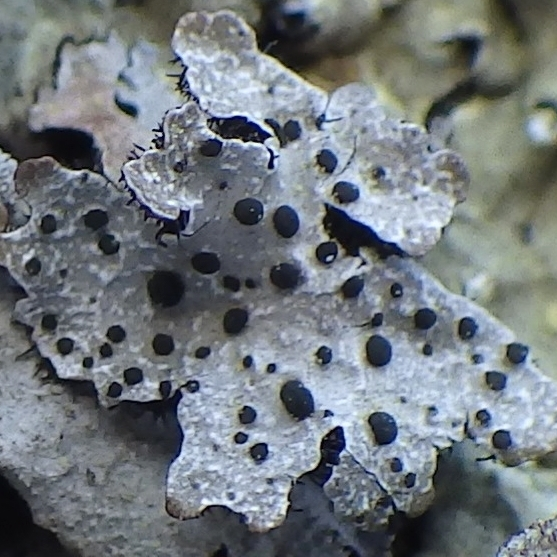

Scientific classification
- Kingdom: Fungi
- Division: Ascomycota
- Class: Dothideomycetes
- Order: Abrothallales
- Family: Abrothallaceae
- Genus: Abrothallus
- Species: A. parmeliarum

Binomial name
- Abrothallus parmeliarum (Sommerf.) Arnold (1874)

Synonyms
- Endocarpon parasiticum Ach. (1814); Lecidea parmeliarum Sommerf. (1826)

= Abrothallus parmeliarum =

Species of fungus in the family Abrothallaceae

Abrothallus parmeliarum is a species of lichenicolous fungus. It grows on the thallus and apothecia (fruiting bodies) of Parmelia species.

The fungus was first described scientifically by the Norwegian botanist Søren Christian Sommerfelt in 1826. In 2018, a proposal was made to conserve the name Lecidea parmeliarum (later Abrothallus parmeliarum), against Endocarpon parasiticum, an older basionym dating from 1814. The conservation was recommended in 2023 by the Nomenclature Committee for Fungi due to the widespread use and recognition of Abrothallus parmeliarum as a common lichenicolous fungus, despite the priority of the lesser-used Endocarpon parasiticum. This action was supported to preserve the nomenclatural stability of what is considered the best-known species name among lichenicolous fungi.
