= Abrothallus boomii =

Scientific classification
- Domain: Eukaryota
- Kingdom: Fungi
- Division: Ascomycota
- Class: Dothideomycetes
- Order: Abrothallales
- Family: Abrothallaceae
- Genus: Abrothallus
- Species: A. boomii

Binomial name
- Abrothallus boomii Pérez-Ortega & Suija (2015)

Species of fungus

Abrothallus boomii is a little-known species of lichenicolous (lichen-dwelling) fungus in the family Abrothallaceae. It parasitizes the lichen Nephroma tangeriense in Portugal. Named after the lichenologist Pieter van den Boom, this species is distinguishable from other Abrothallus species by its host preference and unique characteristics, including having six-spored reproductive structures (asci) and semi-immersed pycnidia with colourless spores. The fungus produces black, sometimes greenish-dusted surface structures on its host.

== Taxonomy ==
Abrothallus boomii was formally described as a new species in 2015 by Ave Suija and Sergio Pérez-Ortega. The type specimen was collected north of Ervas Tenras (Beira Alta Province) in a pine-oak forest along a vineyard, where it was found growing on the thallus of a Nephroma lichen. It is only known to occur at the type locality. The species epithet honours Dutch lichenologist Pieter van den Boom, "author of a long list of research articles and indefatigable collector of lichens and lichenicolous fungi".

== Description ==
Abrothallus boomii specifically inhabits the thallus (body) of the lichen Nephroma tangeriense. The fungus has its mycelium (network of fungal threads) immersed within the host lichen tissue, showing no colour change when tested with potassium iodide (K/I–). Its reproductive structures (ascomata) grow on the surface of the host lichen and are black in colour. Young ascomata are covered with a distinctive greenish powdery coating (pruina). These structures are typically convex, occasionally flat, and mature specimens often develop a bumpy (tuberculate) surface. They measure 285–520 μm (averaging 360 μm) in width and up to 250 μm in height. The host lichen tissue surrounding these structures often turns black.

The uppermost layer of the fruiting body (epihymenial layer) contains dark greenish granules that turn emerald green when potassium hydroxide solution (K) is applied and may turn pink-violet with nitric acid (N). Below this, the hymenium (spore-producing layer) is clear to greenish, also turning emerald green with potassium hydroxide, and measures 55–75 μm high. The base of the structure between the asci is composed of brick-like cells forming a tissue similar to the hypothecium. The filaments between the spore sacs (interascal filaments) appear only in the upper part of this tissue, showing uneven branching, measuring about 2–2.5 μm wide with tips that are not or only slightly widened.

A protective layer (exciple) is only present in young reproductive structures, measuring 35–55 μm wide. The hypothecium (tissue beneath the hymenium) is light brown to greenish, composed of irregularly shaped brick-like cells containing a greenish pigment that turns emerald green with potassium hydroxide, measuring 5.5–11 by 4–7 μm.

The asci (spore-producing sacs) have a double wall (bitunicate), are club-shaped, measure 42–55 by 9–14 μm, and typically contain 6 spores (though sometimes 4 or 8). The ascospores (fungal spores) usually have 2 cells, though mature spores occasionally develop 2–3 cross-walls (septa). These spores are light to dark brown with a slightly rough (verruculose) surface. They have an asymmetric shape with a larger upper cell, often resembling a shoe sole (soleiform), and show varying degrees of constriction at the septum. The spores measure 11.5–20.5 by 5.5–7 μm (upper cell)/4–6 μm (lower cell), with an average of 14.8 by 6.1/4.7 μm.

The fungus also produces an asexual reproductive form (anamorph) with pycnidia (flask-shaped structures). These pycnidia are initially embedded in the tissue, later becoming slightly protruding, measuring approximately 200 μm wide. The pycnidial wall turns green with potassium hydroxide and may turn violet with nitric acid, especially around the opening (ostiole). The cells that produce conidia (conidiogenous cells) develop from the entire inner surface of the pycnidia and measure 7–13.1 by 3.5–5.8 μm (averaging 11.3 by 4.3 μm). The conidia (asexual spores) are simple, colourless, pear-shaped with a flattened end, and measure 7–10.5 by 5.5–8 μm (averaging 9.2 by 6.54 μm).
