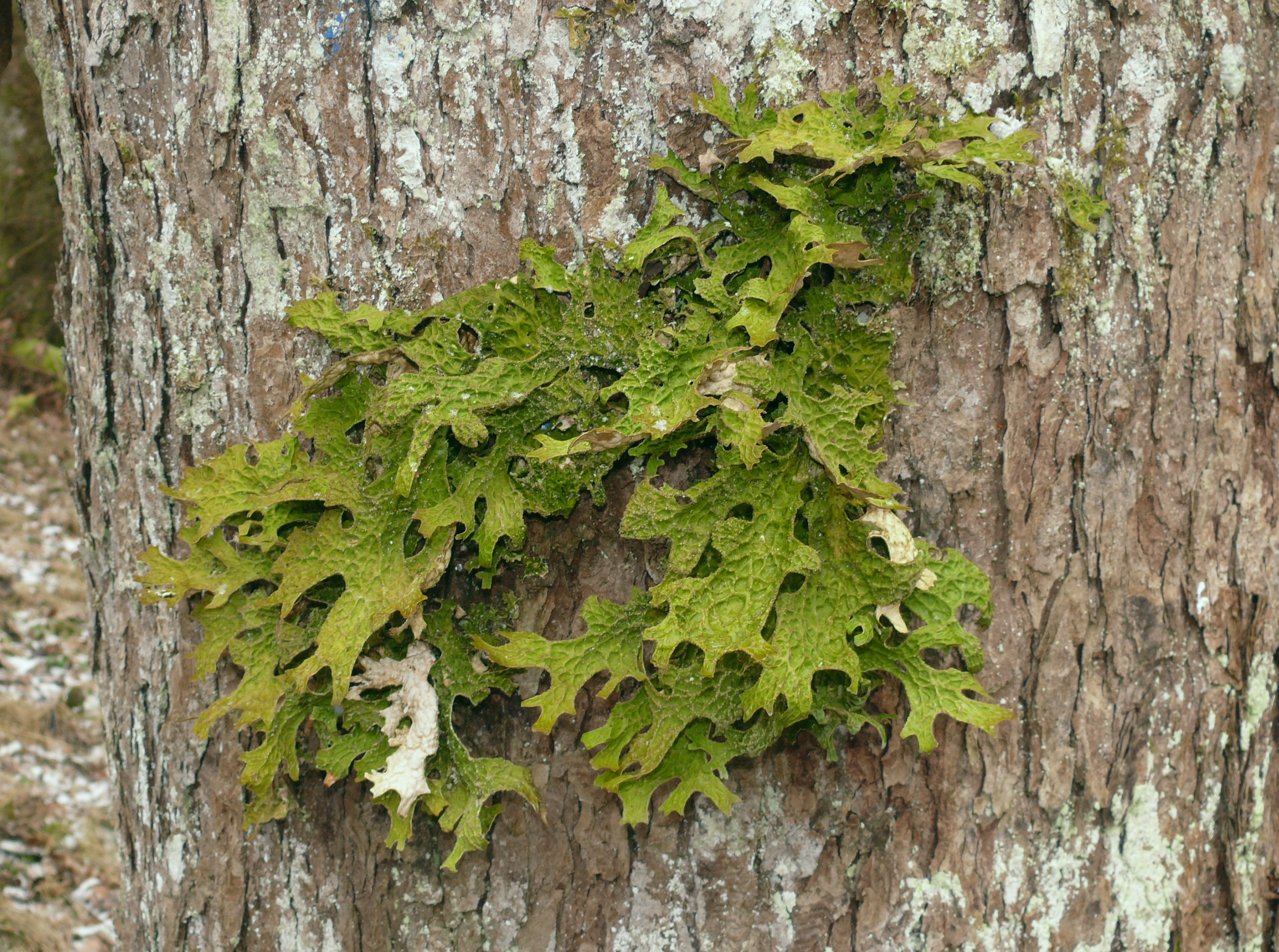
- Lobaria pulmonaria

Scientific classification
- Kingdom: Fungi
- Division: Ascomycota
- Class: Lecanoromycetes
- Order: Peltigerales
- Family: Peltigeraceae
- Genus: Lobaria (Schreb.) Hoffm. (1796)

Type species
- Lobaria pulmonaria (L.) Hoffm. (1796)

Synonyms
- Lichen sect. Lobaria Schreb. (1791); Pulmonaria Hoffm. (1789) [1790]; Reticularia Baumg. (1790); Lobariomyces E.A.Thomas (1939); Ricasoliomyces E.A.Thomas ex Cif. & Tomas. (1953); Stictomyces E.A.Thomas ex Cif. & Tomas. (1953); Anomalobaria Moncada & Lücking (2013)

= Lobaria =

Genus of lichens

Lobaria is a genus of foliose lichens, formerly classified in the family Lobariaceae, but now placed in the Peltigeraceae. They are commonly known as "lung wort" or "lungmoss" as their physical shape somewhat resembles a lung, and their ecological niche is similar to that of moss.

Lobaria are unusual in that they have a three-part symbiosis, containing a fungus, and an alga (as other lichens do), but also a cyanobacterium that fixes nitrogen.

== Taxonomy ==
Lobaria was originally described as a section of the eponymous genus Lichen by German naturalist Johann Christian Daniel von Schreber in 1786. It was proposed as a genus by Georg Franz Hoffmann in 1796. The establishment of Lobaria remained uncertain until Edvard Vainio also described it. He divided the genus into two sections based on different morphologies of the mature spore: Lobaria and Ricasolia. In 2013, the concept of family Lobariaceae was revised with the help of molecular phylogenetics, and, in addition to the creation of several new genera, Ricasolia was promoted to generic status. The family Lobariaceae was synonymized with the Peltigeraceae in 2018.

== Ecology ==
Lichenicolous fungi that have been found growing on Lobaria species include Stigmidium lobariae, Calycina alstrupii, and Abrothallus halei.

A Lobaria-associated actinobacterium, Subtercola lobariae, was isolated from L. retigera collected from the Jiaozi Snow Mountain in Yunnan Province, China. About a third of the bacteria found colonizing the thallus surface of Lobaria pulmonaria were found to belong to the Rhizobiales. This order of bacteria is well-known in their role as beneficial partners in plant-microbe interactions. Advantages conferred by the presence of the bacteria include auxin and vitamin production, nitrogen fixation, and stress protection. Although the bacteria were most prevalent on the thallus surface, they were shown to be able to penetrate into the interhyphal gelatinous matrix of the upper lichen cortical layer. Occasionally, some bacteria colonize the interior of the fungal hyphae.

Hydration traits determine much of a lichen's distribution pattern along a climatic gradient. A study demonstrated that Lobaria amplissima thalli with external cephalodia need more rain than thalli without, consistent with reports of decreasing frequency of external cephalodia from wet to drier climates.

A study using ecological niche modelling of occurrence data of three Lobaria species found in Italy predicts that climate change will impact their distribution range across the country and that there is a high extinction risk resulting from reduction of their range.

== Evolutionary history ==
A fossil impression found in a 12–24 Myr-old Miocene deposit from Trinity County in northern California has strong similarities to extant species of Lobaria, particularly L. pulmonaria and other species with reticulated edges, including L. anomala and L. retigera. Using a molecular clock-calibrated phylogeny to obtain a time estimate for Lobaria yielded a stem age (the time that that clade descended from a common ancestor with its sister clade) of nearly 30 Mya. The evidence suggests that the paleoclimate and the closing or opening of the Bering Strait played a significant role in determining the distribution of most Lobaria species.

== Species ==
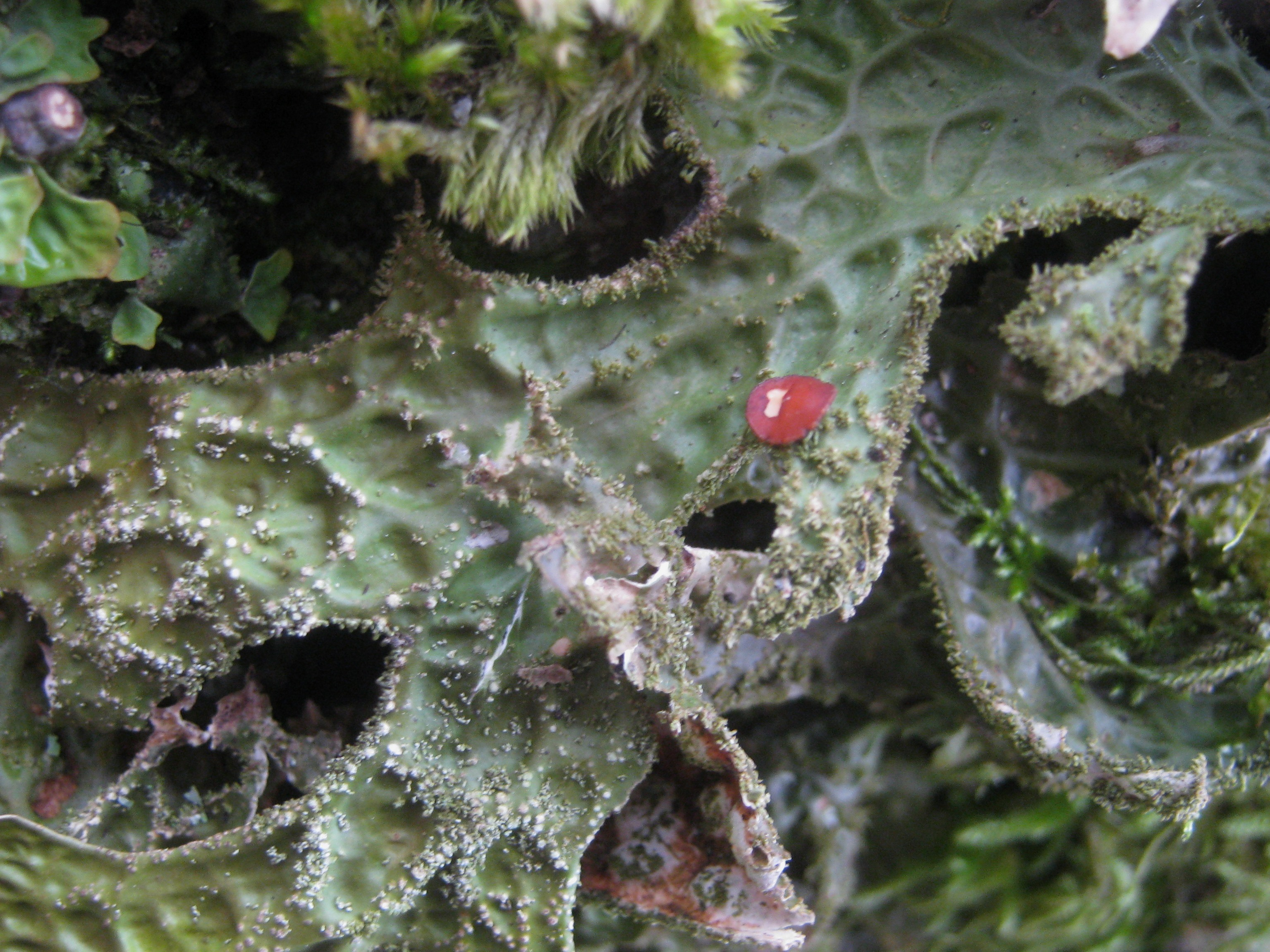
Lobaria macaronesica

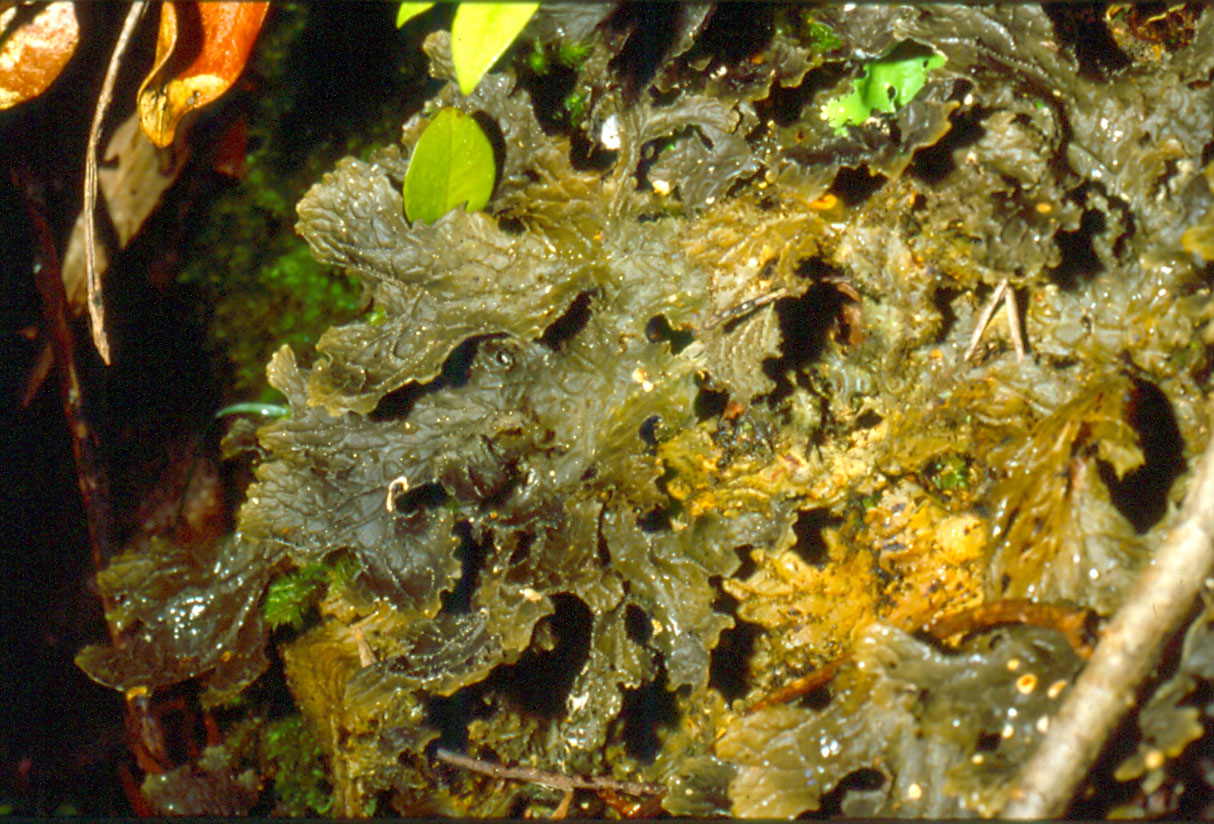
Lobaria retigera

- Lobaria anomala (Brodo & Ahti) T.Sprib. & McCune (2014)
- Lobaria anthraspis (Ach.) T.Sprib. & McCune (2014)
- Lobaria discolor (Bory) Hue (1901)
- Lobaria endochroma Sipman (2004) – New Guinea
- Lobaria hartmannii (Müll.Arg.) Zahlbr. (1925)
- Lobaria hengduanensis C.C.Miao & Li S.Wang (2018) – China
- Lobaria hertelii Sipman (2004) – New Guinea
- Lobaria himalayensis Upreti & Divakar (2008) – India
- Lobaria irrugulosa C.C.Miao & Li S.Wang (2018) – China
- Lobaria isidiophora Yoshim. (1971) – Asia
- Lobaria latilobulata C.C.Miao & Li S.Wang (2018) – China
- Lobaria macaronesica C.Cornejo & Scheid. (2010) – Macaronesia
- Lobaria oregana (Tuck.) Müll.Arg. (1889)
- Lobaria orientalis (Asahina) Yoshim. (1969) – Asia
- Lobaria plurimiseptata (C.Knight) Zahlbr. (1925)
- Lobaria pseudoretigera Sipman (2004) – New Guinea
- Lobaria pulmonaria (L.) Hoffm. (1796)
- Lobaria retigera (Bory) Trevis. (1869)
- Lobaria rhaphispora (C.Knight) Zahlbr. (1925)
- Lobaria spathulata (Inumaru) Yoshim. (1971)

Several species formerly classified in Lobaria have been transferred to other genera in view of modern molecular phylogenetic studies. Examples include Lobaria quercizans and Lobaria amplissima (now in Ricasolia), and Lobaria scrobiculata (now in Lobarina).

== Chemistry ==
Retigeranic acid is a sesterterpene compound isolated from Lobaria retigera. The ethyl acetate extract of Lobaria orientalis collected in Central Vietnam led to the isolation of new β-orcinol depsidones, lobarientalones A and B, and several diphenyl ethers, lobariethers A–E.

== Uses ==
Three species of Lobaria are used as food by ethnic peoples in Yunnan Province (China): L. isidiophora, L. kurokawae, and L. yoshimurae.
