= Symbiochloris reticulata =

Scientific classification
- Kingdom: Plantae
- Division: Chlorophyta
- Class: Trebouxiophyceae
- Order: Trebouxiales
- Family: Trebouxiaceae
- Genus: Symbiochloris
- Species: S. reticulata

Binomial name
- Symbiochloris reticulata (Tschermak-Woess) Škaloud, Friedl, A.Beck & Dal Grande

Synonyms
- Myrmecia reticulata Tschermak-Woess; Dictyochloropsis reticulata (Tschermak-Woess) Tschermak-Woess

Species of alga

Symbiochloris reticulata is a species of green alga in the Trebouxiales. It functions as a photobiont (photosynthetic symbiont) in several lichen species, including Lobaria pulmonaria, but also occurs as a free-living soil alga.

Lichens that share the same photobiont may form so-called photobiont-mediated guilds; for example, Ricasolia amplissima, R. virens, and Lobaria pulmonaria all associate with Symbiochloris reticulata. Phylogenetic analysis of ribosomal RNA sequence data indicates that the species forms a sister group with two other non-motile green algae, Chlorella saccharophila and C. luteoviridis.

Symbiochloris reticulata consists of single, spherical or slightly ellipsoidal cells 4-13(-15) μm in diameter. The cells have a parietal chloroplast which is net-like in structure. Asexual reproduction occurs by the formation of four or eight (sometimes 16) autospores, which are released by the rupture of the parent cell wall.
