= One Square Inch of Silence =

Art project

Coordinates: 47°51′57.5″N 123°52′13.3″W

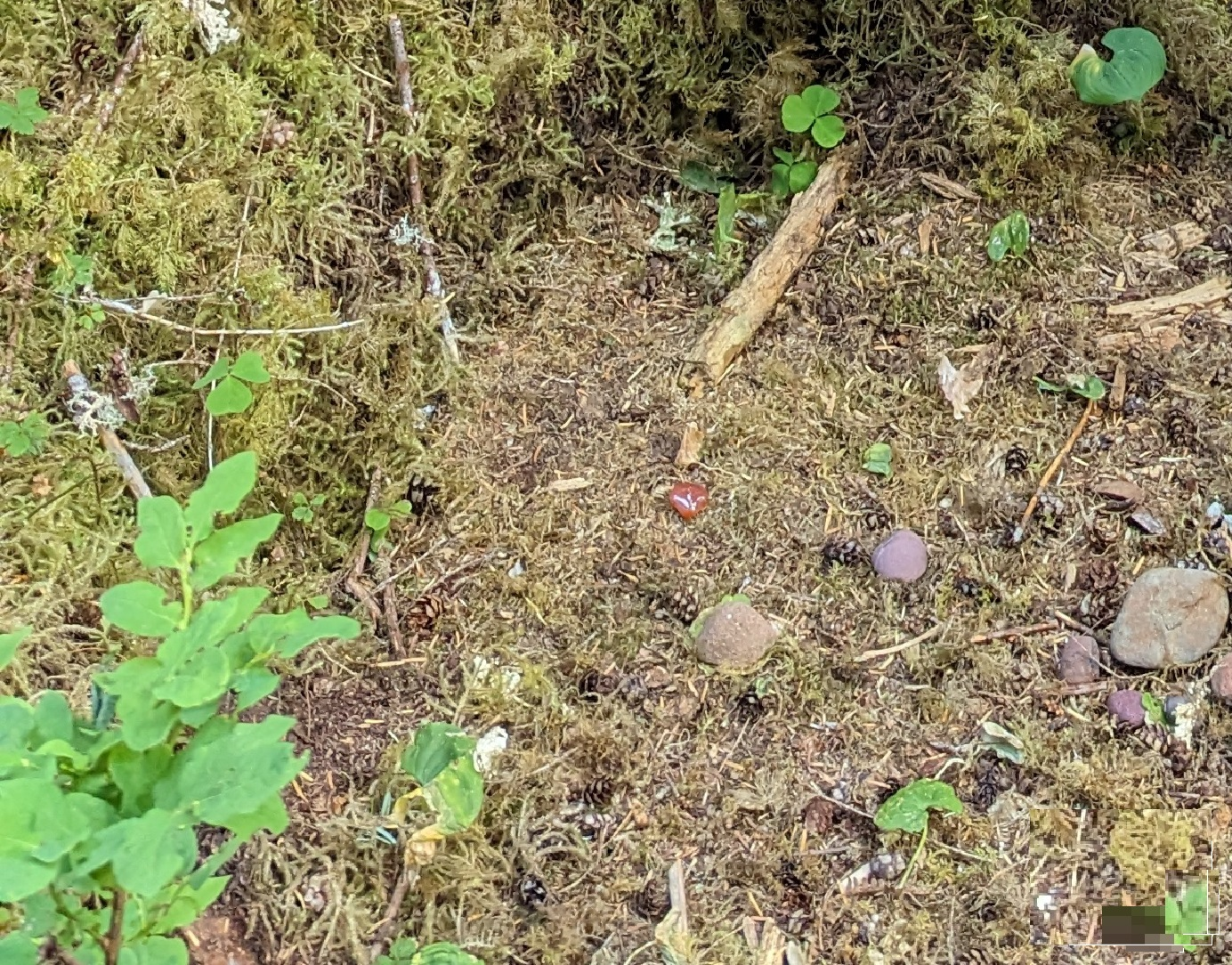
Symbolic marker for the One Square Inch of Silence as seen in July 2023

One Square Inch of Silence is a noise control project symbolized by a small red stone symbolically placed in Hoh Rainforest at Olympic National Park in 2005 by author and sound recording specialist Gordon Hempton. The stone's location has been called "the quietest place in the United States". According to commercial pilot Philip Greenspun, some airlines have voluntarily rerouted flights to avoid inducing noise pollution at the square inch. Hempton has formed a foundation to prevent jet aircraft noise in Olympic National Park and other parks.

Hempton's works, including One Square Inch of Silence, were covered in the 2010 documentary Soundtracker which debuted at the Sedona Film Festival.
