= Lobaria hertelii =

Scientific classification
- Kingdom: Fungi
- Division: Ascomycota
- Class: Lecanoromycetes
- Order: Peltigerales
- Family: Peltigeraceae
- Genus: Lobaria
- Species: L. hertelii

Binomial name
- Lobaria hertelii Sipman (2004)

Species of lichen

Lobaria hertelii is a species of foliose lichen in the family Peltigeraceae. Found in New Guinea, it was formally described as a new species in 2004 by Dutch lichenologist Harrie Sipman.
