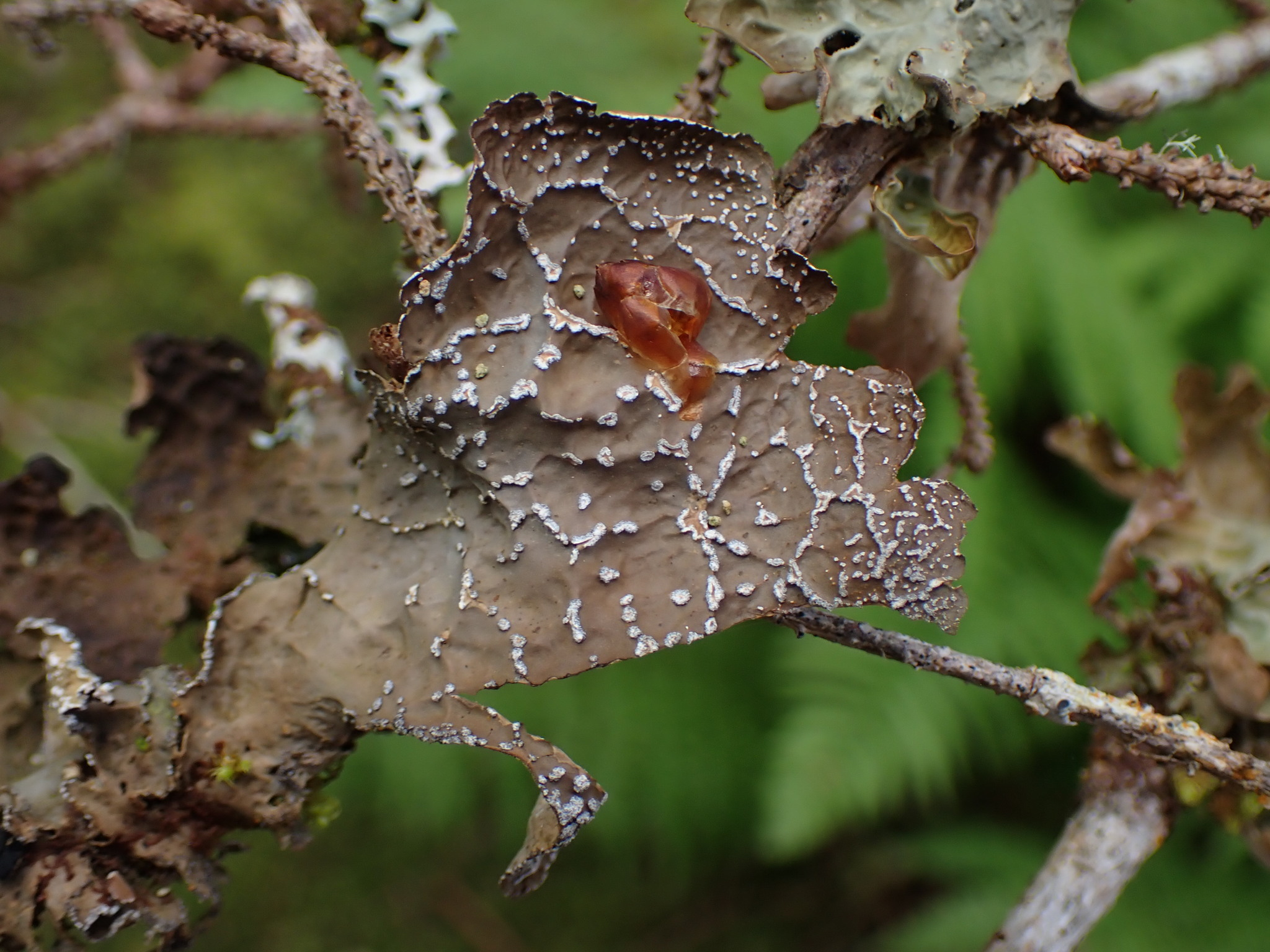

Conservation status
- Secure (NatureServe)

Scientific classification
- Kingdom: Fungi
- Division: Ascomycota
- Class: Lecanoromycetes
- Order: Peltigerales
- Family: Peltigeraceae
- Genus: Lobaria
- Species: L. anomala

Binomial name
- Lobaria anomala (Brodo & Ahti) T.Sprib. & McCune (2014)

Synonyms
- Anomalobaria anomala (Brodo & Ahti) B.Moncada & Lücking (2013); Pseudocyphellaria anomala Brodo & Ahti (1987)

= Lobaria anomala =

Species of lichen

Lobaria anomala, commonly known as the netted specklebelly, is a species of foliose lichen in the family Peltigeraceae. It is found in coastal western North America, where it grows on trees in humid environments. The lichen was first described as a new species in 1987 as a species of Pseudocyphellaria, though it had been mentioned in scientific papers before.

== Taxonomy ==
The lichen was first formally described as a new species in 1987 by Irwin M. Brodo and Teuvo Ahti as a species of Pseudocyphellaria. It had previously been mentioned in various scientific papers, but never validly published. For example, George Knox Merrill had proposed the name Sticta limbata var. anomala in a 1909 exsiccata series, but without properly describing it: he published a description in English, but the requirement at the time was for this description to be in Latin. Adolf Hugo Magnusson published the species (as Pseudocyphellaria anomala) in 1940, but invalidly, as it was a nomen nudum, indicating it was published without the necessary descriptive elements or type designation that would make it validly published according to the standards of the International Code of Nomenclature for algae, fungi, and plants. To simplify the authorship of the species, Brodo and Ahti decided to exclude Merrill and Magnusson from the author citation, but acknowledged that "this procedure does not do justice to the originators of the name." The type specimen was collected in 1908 from King County, Washington by amateur botanist Albert Scott Foster.

In 2013, Bibiana Moncada and Robert Lücking proposed the new genus Anomalobaria to contain the species Anomalobaria anthraspis, and the type species, Anomalobaria anomala. This was based on molecular phylogenetic analysis that suggested that these species formed a distinct clade in a sampling of species formerly placed in Pseudocyphellaria. The main diagnostic difference between Lobaria and Anomalobaria was the presence of pseudocyphellae on the lobe undersides of the latter genus. Later molecular work, however, did not support the recognition of Anomalobaria as distinct from Lobaria, and the former name was synonymized with the latter.

In 2014, Toby Spribille and Bruce McCune formally transferred the taxon to genus Lobaria. The vernacular name of the lichen is the netted specklebelly, which refers to the net-like ridges on the upper thallus as well as the pale specks of pseudocyphellae on the undersurface.

== Description ==
The thallus of Lobaria anomala is medium to dark brown and features ridges and depressions that are punctuated by white or grey soredia, and sometimes rounded to irregular soralia between the ridges. Individual lobes, which are rounded or angular, measure 1–3 cm (0.4–1.2 in) wide. Apothecia are rare in this species. It contains stictic acid and triterpenes as lichen products. The expected results for standard chemical spot tests are: medulla PD+ (orange), K+ (yellow), KC−, and C−.

Lobaria anthraspis, which shares a similar distribution in northwestern North America, closely resembles L. anomala in appearance. However, these species can be distinguished by their reproductive strategies and ecological preferences. Unlike L. anomala, L. anthraspis lacks soredia and frequently produces apothecia. Ecologically, L. anthraspis is less common and tends to favor riparian habitats, whereas L. anomala has a broader ecological range.

== Habitat and distribution ==
Lobaria anomala occurs in western North America, along the Pacific coast of the United States and Canada. It grows on both deciduous and coniferous trees on humid locales, particularly in the Interior Cedar Hemlock zone and in low-elevation coastal forests. Its range extends north from Alaska, through British Columbia, south to California. It was expected to occur on Cypress Island (Washington), but was not found during an extensive survey of the lichen flora on the island.

== Species interactions ==
Lichenicolous (lichen-dwelling) fungi have been documented growing on Lobaria anomala. These include Plectocarpon lichenum and an unidentified species of Dactylospora. When P. lichenum infests L. anomala, it causes the formation of blackish apothecia that lack a thalline margin.
