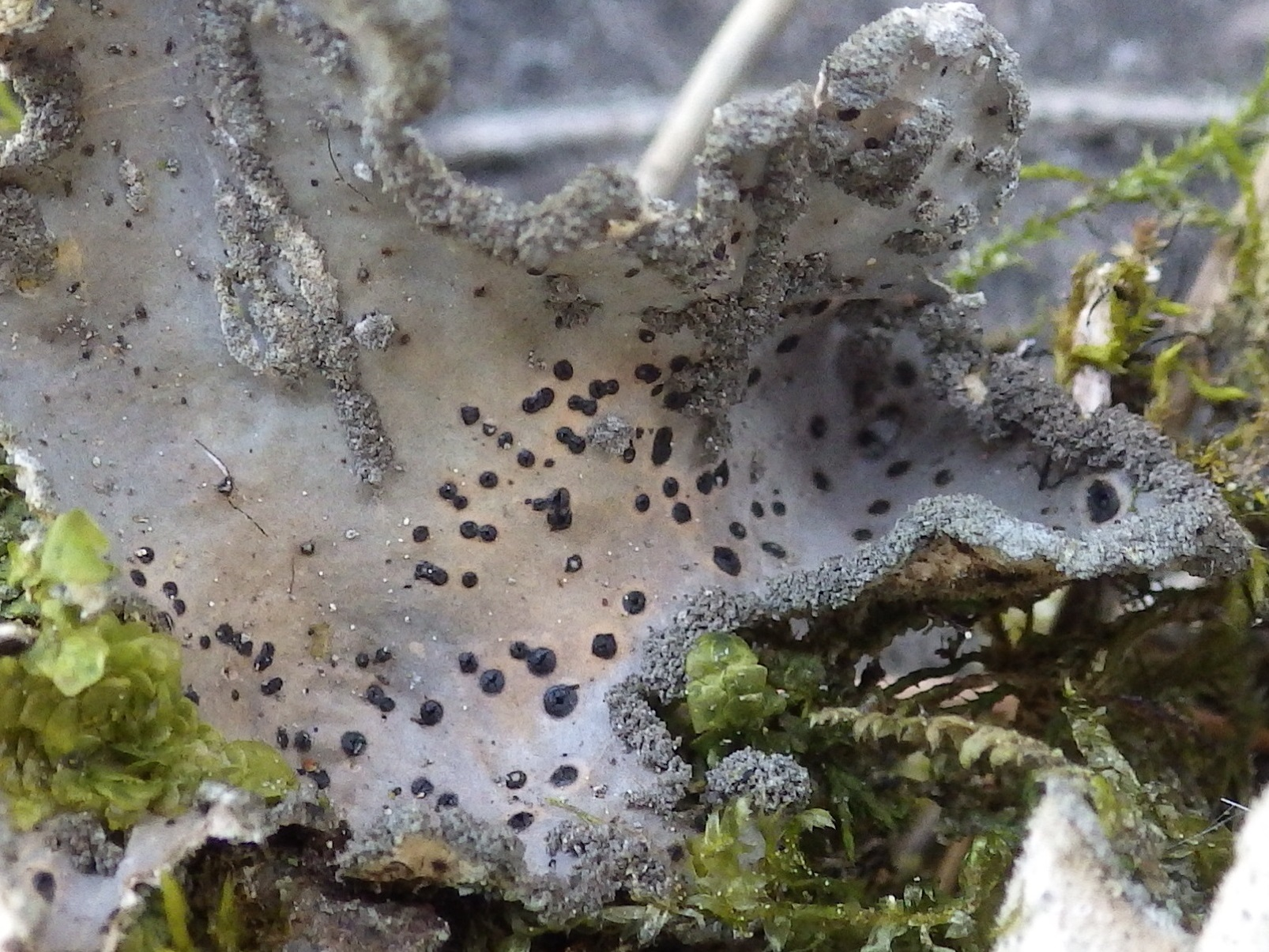
- Abrothallus welwitschii parasitising Sticta limbata

Scientific classification
- Domain: Eukaryota
- Kingdom: Fungi
- Division: Ascomycota
- Class: Dothideomycetes
- Order: Abrothallales
- Family: Abrothallaceae
- Genus: Abrothallus
- Species: A. welwitschii

Binomial name
- Abrothallus welwitschii Mont. ex Tul. (1852)

Synonyms
- Phymatopsis welwitschii (Mont. ex Tul.) Trevis. (1856)

= Abrothallus welwitschii =

Species of lichen

Abrothallus welwitschii is a species of lichenicolous fungus in the family Abrothallaceae. It grows on species of the foliose lichen genus Sticta. The type specimen was originally collected in Portugal in 1840 by Austrian botanist Friedrich Welwitsch, and it is after him for whom the species is named. Camille Montagne described the species in 1851, but he did not published the name validly; it was published validly by Charles Tulasne a year later.

The fungus has been collected throughout Europe, Africa (Kenya), New Zealand, South America (Chile), and northern North America. Recorded hosts have been Sticta fuliginosa, S. limbata, S. nylanderiana, and S. sylvatica.
