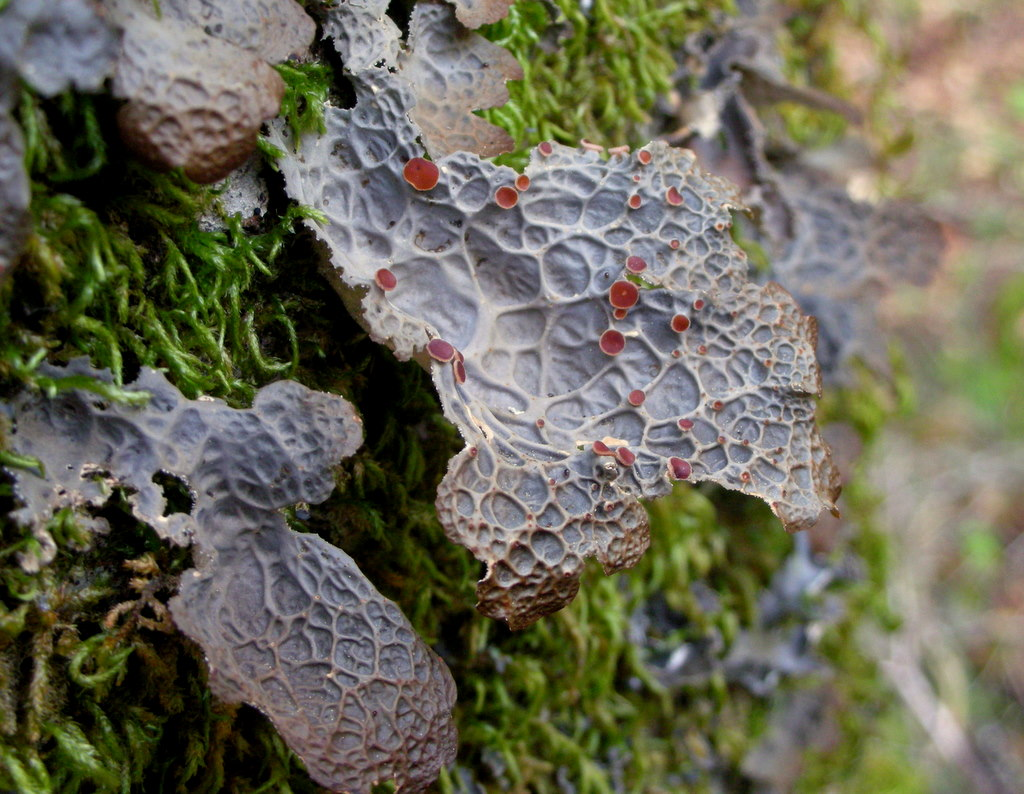

Conservation status
- Apparently Secure (NatureServe)

Scientific classification
- Kingdom: Fungi
- Division: Ascomycota
- Class: Lecanoromycetes
- Order: Peltigerales
- Family: Peltigeraceae
- Genus: Lobaria
- Species: L. anthraspis

Binomial name
- Lobaria anthraspis (Ach.) T.Sprib. & McCune (2014)

Synonyms
- Anomalobaria anthraspis (Ach.) B.Moncada & Lücking (2013); Cyanisticta anthraspis (Ach.) Gyeln. (1937); Lichen filix * anthraspis (Ach.) Lam. (1813); Pseudocyphellaria anthraspis (Ach.) H.Magn. (1939); Sticta anthraspis Ach. (1803); Stictina anthraspis (Ach.) Nyl. (1890); Stictina faveolata * anthraspis (Ach.) Nyl. (1868)

= Lobaria anthraspis =

Species of lichen

Lobaria anthraspis is a species of foliose lichen in the subfamily Lobarioidiae of the family Peltigeraceae. It was originally named Sticta anthraspis by pioneer lichenologist Erik Acharius in 1803. In 1939, Swedish botanist Adolf Hugo Magnusson proposed a transfer to genus Pseudocyphellaria, and it was considered a member of that genus for several decades, until the advent of modern molecular phylogenetics led to refinements and reorganisation of family Peltigeraceae. Toby Spribille and Bruce McCune transferred it to Lobaria in 2014.
