= Abrothallus secedens =

Scientific classification
- Kingdom: Fungi
- Division: Ascomycota
- Class: Dothideomycetes
- Order: Abrothallales
- Family: Abrothallaceae
- Genus: Abrothallus
- Species: A. secedens

Binomial name
- Abrothallus secedens Wedin & R.Sant. (1994)

Species of lichen

Abrothallus secedens is a species of lichenicolous fungus in the family Abrothallaceae. Found in Africa, South America, and the United States, it was formally described as a new species in 1994 by Swedish lichenologists Mats Wedin and Rolf Santesson. The type specimen was collected by the first author on the Martial Glacier in Ushuaia (Tierra del Fuego, Argentina) at an altitude of 550 m (1,800 ft), where it was found on the thallus of the foliose lichen Pseudocyphellaria dubia, which itself was growing on the base of a Nothofagus antarctica tree. It has also been collected in Chile, Kenya, and Alaska. The species epithet of the fungus, secedens ("splitting apart") refers to the two-celled ascospores that eventually separate into single-celled part spores. Known hosts for Abrothallus secedens include Crocodia aurata, Pseudocyphellaria dubia, P. mallota, P. obvoluta, and other Pseudocyphellaria lichens not identified to species.
