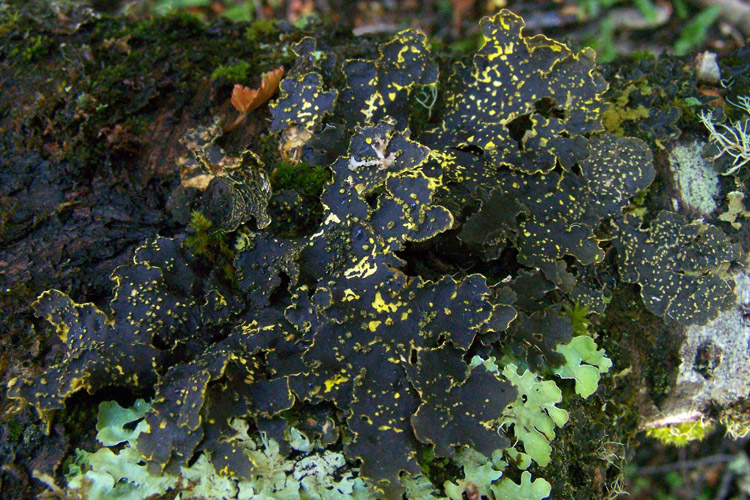
- in Omora Ethnobotanical Park (Navarino Island, Chile)

Scientific classification
- Domain: Eukaryota
- Kingdom: Fungi
- Division: Ascomycota
- Class: Lecanoromycetes
- Order: Peltigerales
- Family: Peltigeraceae
- Genus: Pseudocyphellaria
- Species: P. granulata

Binomial name
- Pseudocyphellaria granulata (C.Bab.) Malme (1899)

Synonyms
- Sticta granulata C.Bab. (1855); Lobaria granulata (C.Bab.) Kuntze (1893); Phaeosticta granulata (C.Bab.) Trevis. (1869); Sticta carpoloma var. granulata (C.Bab.) Hook.f. (1867); Sticta granulata C.Bab. (1855); Sticta richardii var. granulata (C.Bab.) Nyl. (1858); Stictina carpoloma subsp. granulata (C.Bab.) Nyl. (1860); Stictina granulata (C.Bab.) Nyl. (1860)

= Pseudocyphellaria granulata =

Species of lichen

Pseudocyphellaria granulata is a species of foliose lichen in the family Lobariaceae. It is found in South America and New Zealand.

== Taxonomy ==
The species was first described in 1855 by English naturalist Churchill Babington, as Sticta granulata. The original specimens upon which the description was made were collected on New Zealand's South Island. Gustaf Oskar Andersson Malme transferred the taxon to the genus Pseudocyphellaria in 1899.

== Species interactions ==
The springtail species Pachytullbergia scabra (Collembola: Pachytullbergiidae) has been found inhabiting the epiphytic corticolous thalli of Pseudocyphellaria granulata in a cool temperate forest of Argentina, a rare documented instance of an arthropod-lichen association in this region.
