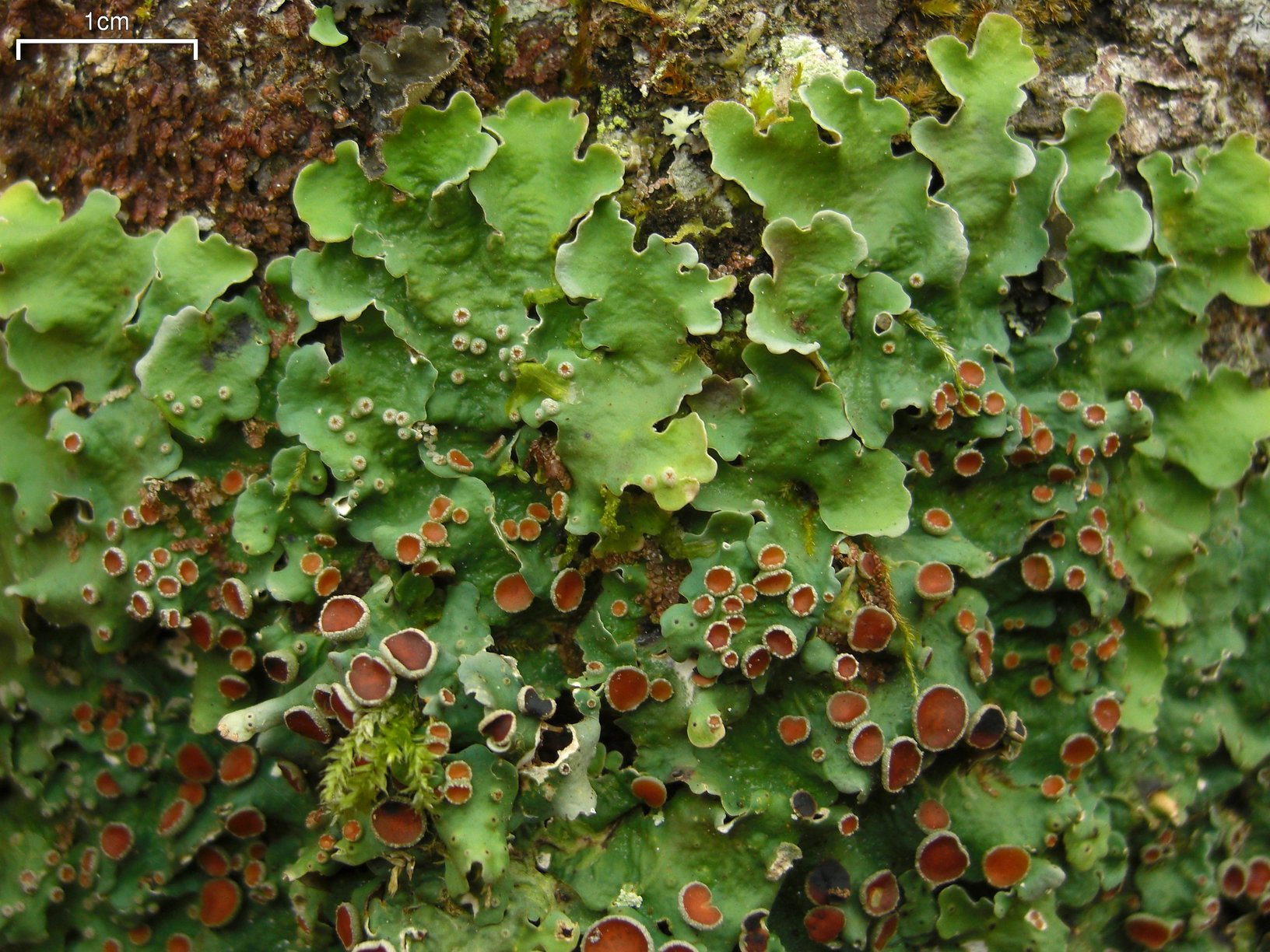

Scientific classification
- Domain: Eukaryota
- Kingdom: Fungi
- Division: Ascomycota
- Class: Lecanoromycetes
- Order: Peltigerales
- Family: Peltigeraceae
- Genus: Lobaria
- Species: L. quercizans

Binomial name
- Lobaria quercizans Michx. (1803)

Synonyms
- Parmelia quercizans (Michx.) Ach. (1810); Ricasolia quercizans (Michx.) Stizenb. (1895); Sticta quercizans (Michx.) Ach.

= Lobaria quercizans =

Species of lichen

Lobaria quercizans or Ricasolia quercizans, commonly known as the smooth lungwort, is a macrolichen in the family Peltigeraceae. It forms large, smooth, grey (pale green when wet) growths that often have abundant red-brown apothecia.

== Distribution ==
Most records are from eastern North America but there are also isolated probable location records from South America (Bolivia), eastern Asia (China, Korea, Outer Manchuria). In eastern North America, it is found from Newfoundland to northern Georgia and west to eastern Minnesota. An outlying population is found in the Ouachita Mountains.

== Ecology ==
In eastern North America, L. quercizans is found primarily on the bark of deciduous trees, usually maples (Acer species). In the southern parts of its range A. saccharum (sugar maple) is preferred. Further north, where there is less A. saccharum, A. rubrum (red maple) is favoured.

== Uses ==
The lichen is used for food and medicine by the Menomini people of Wisconsin.
