= Ave Suija =

Estonian botanist

Ave Suija (born 16 April 1969) is an Estonian lichenologist. As at 2024 she works for the University of Tartu. The lichenicolous fungus species Capronia suijae was named in her honour in 2017.

== See also ==
- Category:Taxa named by Ave Suija
