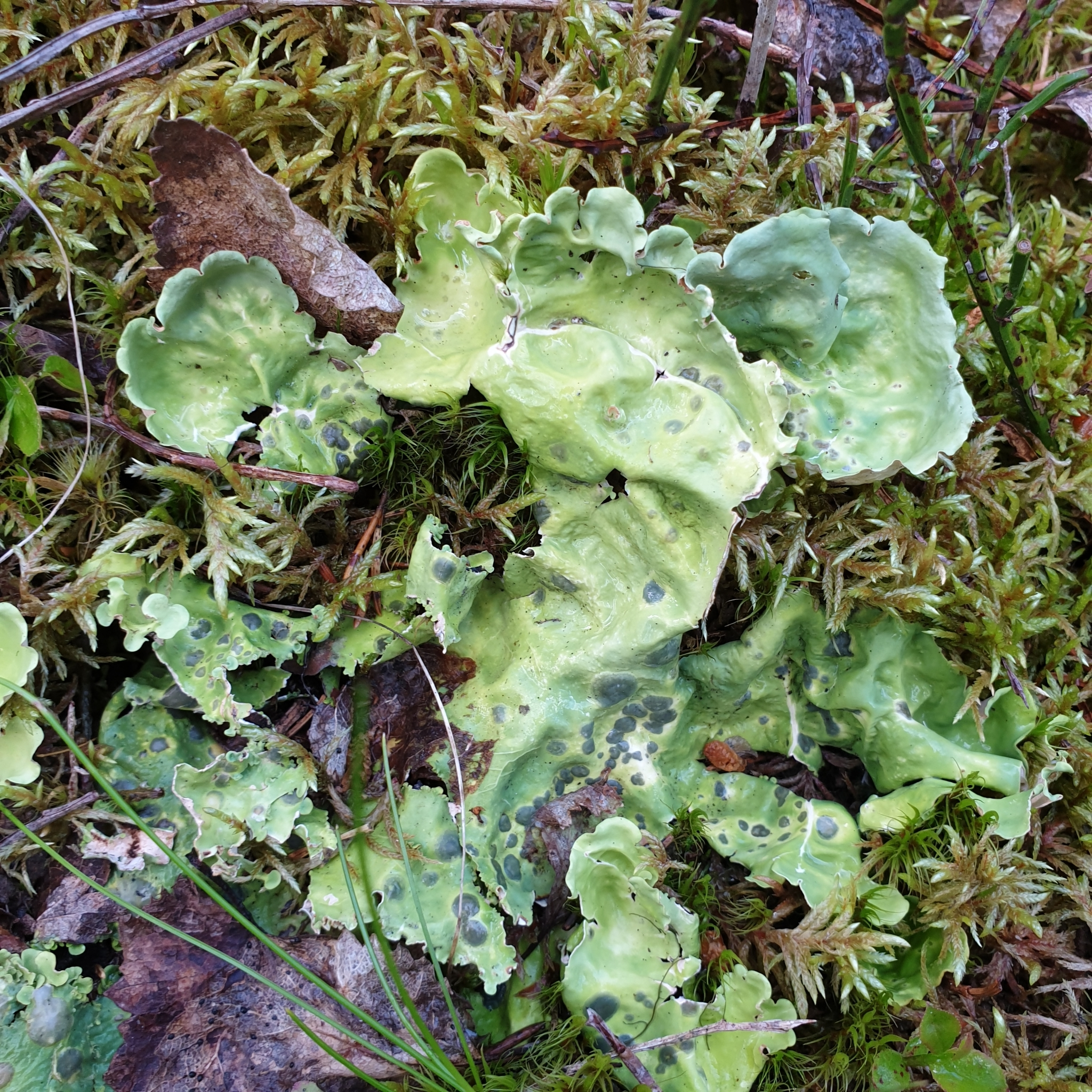

Conservation status
- Secure (NatureServe)

Scientific classification
- Kingdom: Fungi
- Division: Ascomycota
- Class: Lecanoromycetes
- Order: Peltigerales
- Family: Peltigeraceae
- Genus: Nephroma
- Species: N. arcticum

Binomial name
- Nephroma arcticum (L.) Torss. (1843)

Synonyms
- Lichen arcticus L. (1753); Lichen polaris Ach. (1799); Nephroma polare Ach. (1810); Nephromium arcticum (L.) Hav. (1897); Opisteria arctica (L.) Vain. (1909); Parmelia arctica (L.) Linds. (1871); Peltidea arctica (L.) Wahlenb. (1812); Peltidea polaris Ach. (1803); Peltigera arctica (L.) Raeusch. (1797); Peltigera polaris Spreng. (1827)

= Nephroma arcticum =

Species of lichen

Nephroma arcticum, the arctic kidney lichen, is a species of foliose (leafy), terricolous (ground-dwelling) lichen in the family Parmeliaceae. It has a yellowish-green thallus up to 8 cm (3 in) across made of large lobes, with a dark, tomentose lower surface. It is a tripartite lichen, consisting of a fungus and two photobiont partners: a species of nitrogen-fixing cyanobacteria (contained within dark, blistered cephalodia), and a species of green alga. First described by Carl Linnaeus in 1753, it is one of only two Nephroma species in North America that use green algae as their primary photobiont.

Nephroma arcticum is widely distributed throughout the circumpolar regions of Asia, Europe, and North America, where it grows in semi-open coniferous forests and mountainous birch forests on shaded and moist ground, on moss carpets or on mossy rocks. The species is ecologically significant for its role in nitrogen fixation and as a food source for various animals including reindeer and mountain goats. Alaska Natives have historically used it both as food and traditional medicine. While generally secure across its range, its abundance varies regionally, being common in many arctic and subarctic areas but rare or imperilled in some southern portions of its distribution.

The species has been the subject of extensive research into its photosynthetic characteristics, nitrogen metabolism, and bacterial associations. Studies have revealed several key adaptations of N. arcticum to arctic conditions, including its reflective thallus surface that regulates light exposure and physiological mechanisms that enable photosynthesis during short summer seasons. The species shows considerable variation in its symbiotic relationships, with high genetic diversity among its cyanobacterial partners and the ability to develop separate cyanobacterial growth forms under certain conditions. The lichen's southern distribution limits are determined primarily by biological factors, particularly gastropod grazing of nitrogen-rich cyanobacterial tissues, rather than by temperature tolerance.

== Taxonomy ==
The species, originally named Lichen arcticus, was one of the first few dozen lichen species formally described by the Swedish botanist Carl Linnaeus in his 1753 work Species Plantarum. Linnaeus derived the diagnostic phrase from his earlier Flora Svecica (1745), adding a single descriptive term, laevis (smooth). He also referenced Flora Lapponica (1737). Linnaeus's original concept of the species was represented by five herbarium sheets in the Linnaean Herbarium (LINN), all annotated by Linnaeus himself. Two of these specimens were later selected as possible lectotypes: Reginald Heber Howe, Jr. (1912) designated specimen 1273.183, while Peter James and F. Joy White (1987) designated specimen 1273.180. Howe's typification has priority, and specimen 1273.183, which bears numbers from both Species Plantarum and Flora Svecica, is regarded as the lectotype, serving as the generitype of Nephroma.

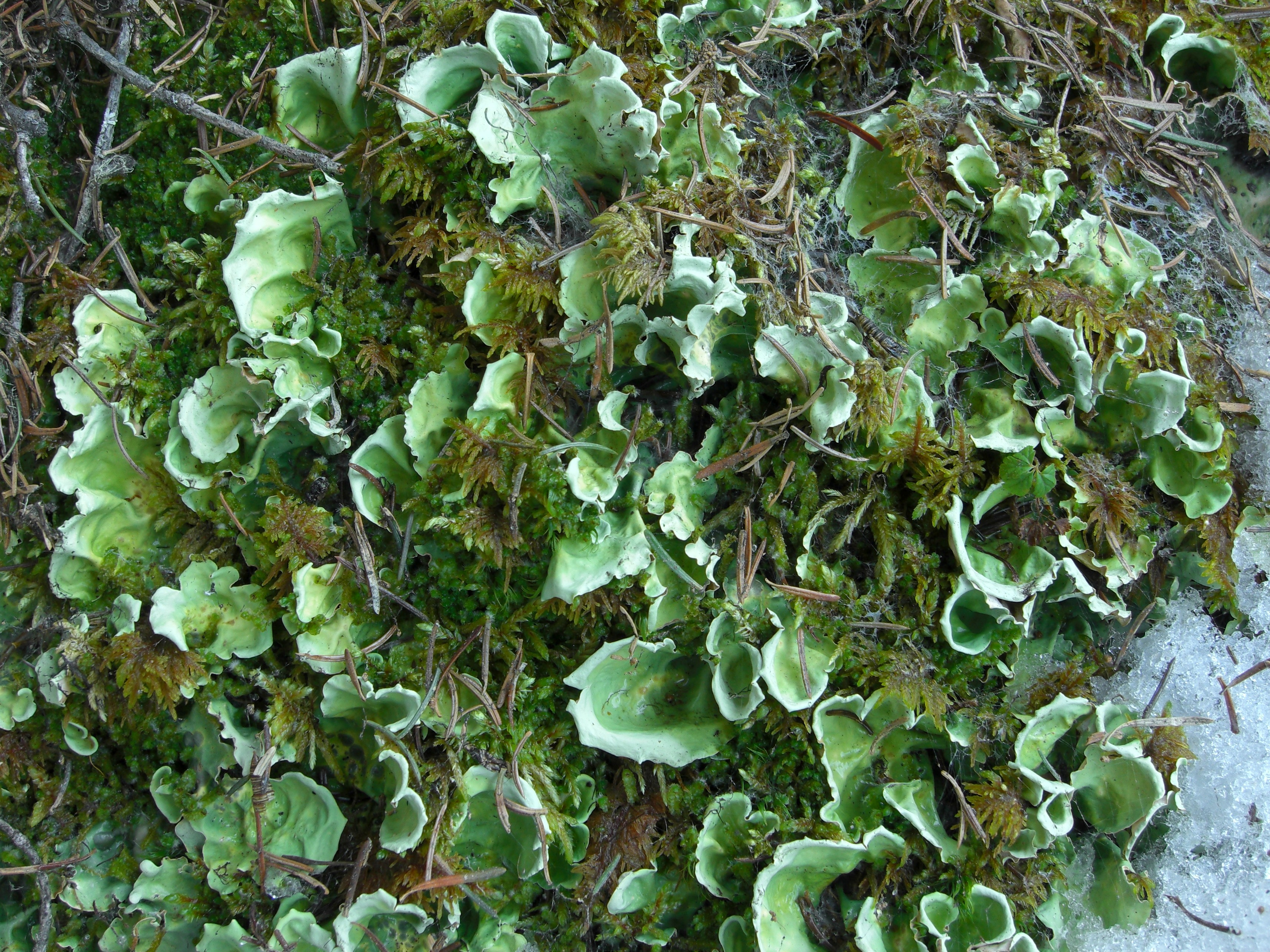
Growing among moss and melting snow in Wells Gray Provincial Park, British Columbia, Canada

Linnaeus's brief diagnosis included several of its key features:

- the lichen has a creeping growth form, with flat, smooth, and lobed leaves (the thallus).
- lobes are wide and obtuse, and the underside of the thallus is covered in hairs.
- the upper surface of the thallus is smooth, while the underside is snowy white.
- the lichen's reproductive structures (calyces, an early term for apothecia, the lichen's reproductive structures) were described as flat and oval, attached to small, lace-like extensions of the thallus.

Linnaeus noted that the lichen grows on the ground, particularly under junipers in northern Sweden. He further described the shield (apothecia) underside as "large, livid-flesh-coloured, about the size of a thumb", remarking that it is among the widest of all known lichens at the time. Linnaeus's description summarised what he considered the distinctive features of this species that allowed for its identification and differentiation from other lichens in the region.

Since its original description, the taxon has been proposed for inclusion in several genera throughout its taxonomic history, including Peltigera (Raeusch., 1797), Peltidea (Göran Wahlenberg, 1812), Parmelia (Linds., 1871), Nephromium (Johan Havaas, 1897), and Opisteria (Edvard Vainio, 1909). The Swedish lichenologist Gustav Torssell transferred it to the genus Nephroma in 1843, establishing the binomial name by which it is now known.

A 2002 molecular phylogenetics study confirmed that Nephroma forms a monophyletic group with Peltigera as its sister genus. Within Nephroma, N. arcticum was found to be relatively divergent from other species, suggesting an early evolutionary split. The study also demonstrated that tripartite species like N. arcticum, which contain both green algal and cyanobacterial photobionts, do not form a monophyletic group within the genus, indicating that the transition between bipartite and tripartite forms has occurred multiple times during the evolution of Nephroma.

In North America, it is commonly known as the "arctic kidney lichen". Other vernacular names include "green paw", and "greenlight lichen" (Néphrome arctique in French).

== Description ==
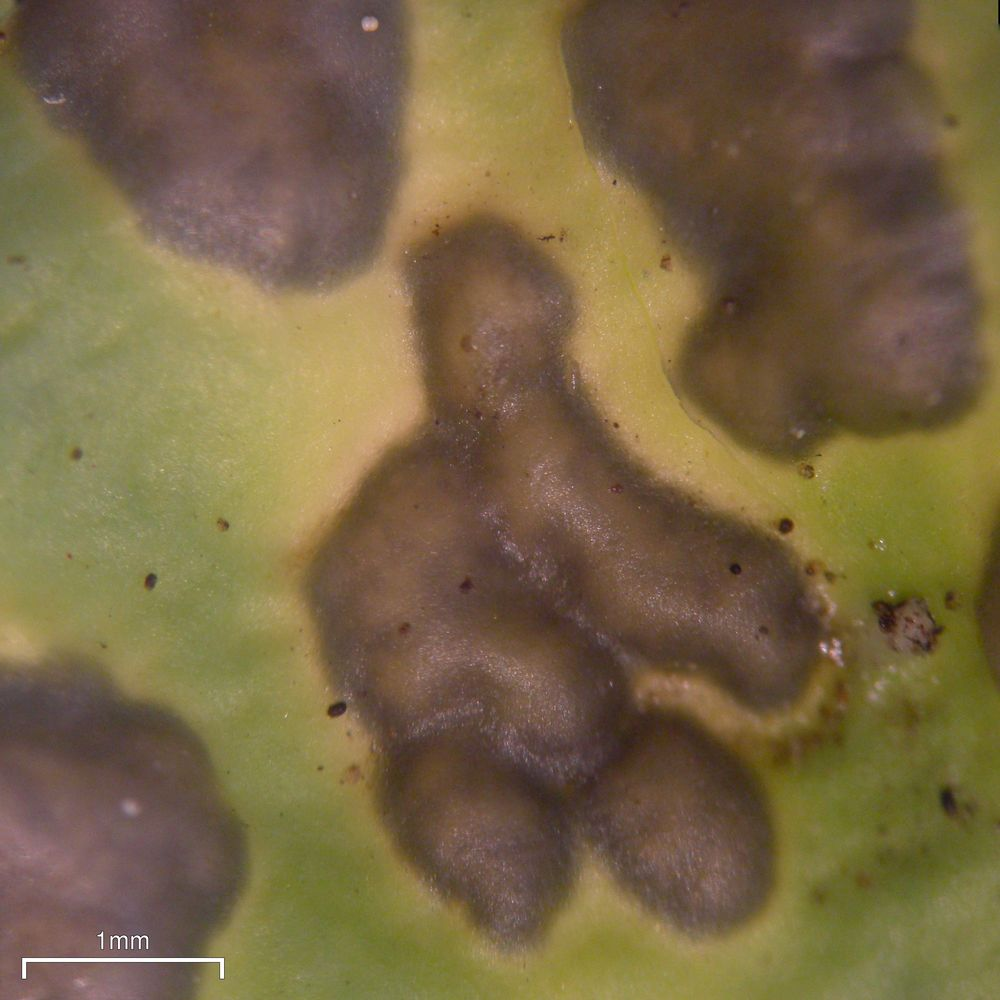
Closeup of cephalodia

Nephroma arcticum has a foliose thallus that sometimes forms rosettes and sometimes is irregular, reaching up to about 8 cm (3 in), or rarely up to 15 cm (6 in) across. Individual thalli can merge to form loose colonies up to 1 m (3.3 ft) wide. Individual lobes of the thallus are up to 2–5 cm (0.8–2.0 in) wide; they are smooth or slightly pitted, tongue-like, and have ascending margins. The upper thallus surface is yellow-green, blue-green or bright green, and often glossy. In contrast, the undersurface is dull with paler margins, and is darker towards the centre. It has a thick tomentum. The absence of veins and rhizines helps distinguish this species from similar-looking Peltigera species.

Apothecia are common in Nephroma arcticum. They are red-orange to red-brown in colour, kidney-shaped, and typically measure 1–2 cm (0.4–0.8 in) in diameter. Spores are 23–30 by 4–5 μm, have a somewhat fusiform shape, and contain three septa (internal partitions). Conidiomata are rare; when they occur, they appear at the margins of the lobes. They produce conidia (asexual spores) 3–4 by 1–2 μm. The photobiont is green (from the genus Coccomyxa); cyanobacteria (from genus Nostoc) are present in large, bluish cephalodia that are readily apparent in moist thalli. Neither isidia nor soredia, vegetative propagules found in many lichens, occur in this species.

A blue-green phycotype (same fungal partner but different algae or cyanobacteria) of Nephroma arcticum was first reported from Norway in 1983. The chemistry of the blue-green phycotype is identical to that of the more common green phycotype, except for the absence of usnic acid in the blue-green.

The cephalodia of N. arcticum can occasionally grow into separate thalli of moderate size. These outgrowths represent a cyanobacterial form of the species that has been found in moist inland forests of British Columbia at lower elevations. While these forms resemble N. silvae-veteris, they can be distinguished by their chemistry (medulla K−, PD−) and their physical connection to typical N. arcticum lobes.

In North America, N. arcticum is one of only two members of the genus Nephroma that contain green algae as their primary photobiont, the other being N. expallidum (alpine kidney lichen). While both species possess cyanobacteria in cephalodia, N. expallidum can be distinguished by its narrower lobes with distinctly crenulate margins, and its cephalodia are not visible on the upper surface. N. expallidum also has a more restricted distribution, being confined primarily to arctic tundra and northern boreal woodlands. All other North American Nephroma species form symbioses exclusively with cyanobacteria, resulting in darker thalli that appear brown when moistened.

== Chemistry ==
Lichen products that have been isolated from Nephroma arcticum include zeorin, usnic acid, hyphonephroarctin, nephroarctin, and phenarctin. Lichen products are confined to the green algal part of the thallus, not the cephalodia. The expected chemical spot test reactions for Nephroma arcticum are C–, K+ (yellowish), KC+ (yellow), Pd+ (yellow) in the thallus, and UV+ in the medulla.

The usnic acid in the cortex of N. arcticum serves an important photoprotective function. The compound occurs as tiny crystals outside fungal hyphae and helps screen harmful ultraviolet (UV) radiation while also reducing transmittance of photosynthetically active radiation to underlying cells. The concentration of usnic acid varies with habitat, with higher concentrations found in populations from well-lit alpine and subalpine sites compared to shaded lowland forest populations. This adaptation helps protect the photobiont from excess light exposure in high-light environments, while allowing maximum light penetration in shaded forest habitats. Other UV-absorbing compounds in the species, such as nephroarctin and phenarctin, show an opposite pattern with higher concentrations in shaded forest populations, suggesting these medullary compounds may serve different functions such as herbivore defense.

Aqueous extracts of the lichen have been shown in in vitro experiments to have antifungal effects against a wide range of fungi.

== Habitat and distribution ==
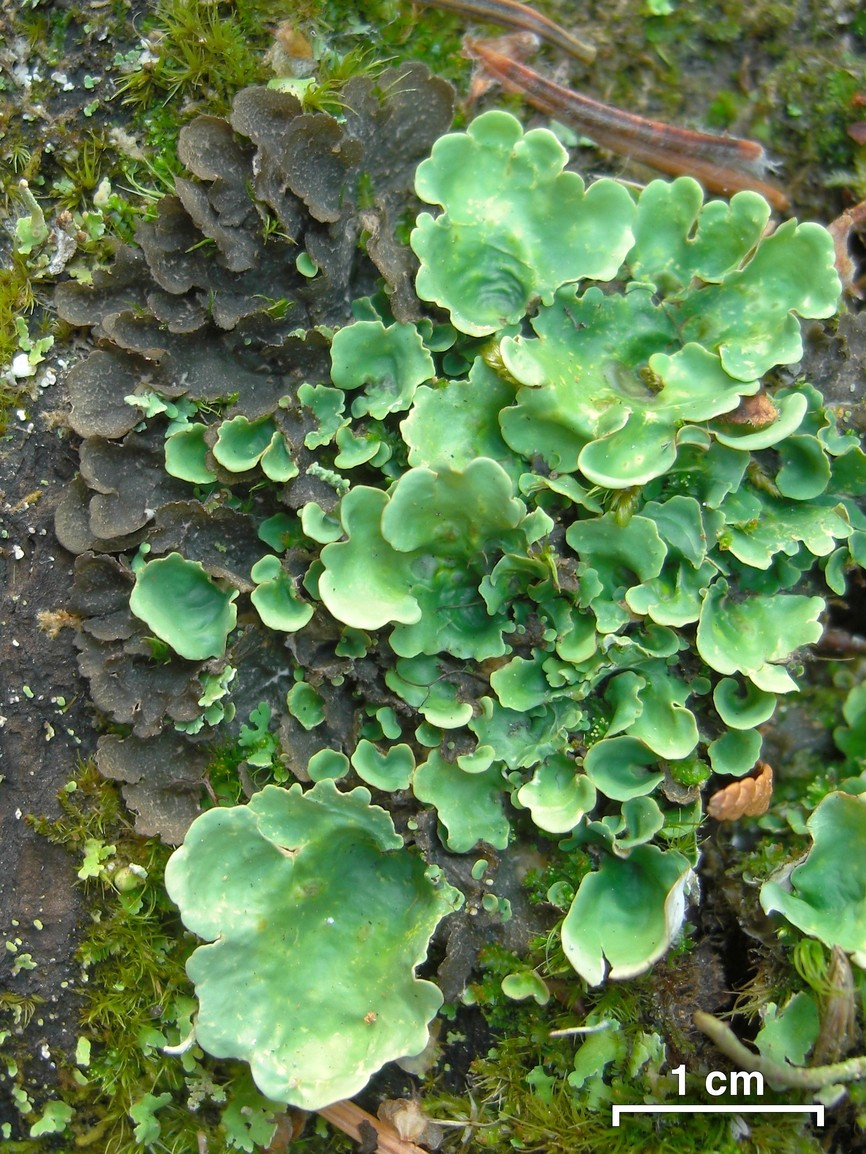
Rare example of the cyanomorph growing alongside the typical chloromorph. Cyanobacterial colonies reside in cephalodia on the green lobes (visible as faint blisters), which can occasionally develop into independent lichens under suitable conditions.

The species has a primarily arctic range, occurring throughout northern Canada from Alaska to Newfoundland, with isolated populations extending into New England and Wyoming. In Canada, it is abundant (S5) in British Columbia, Labrador, Quebec, and Yukon Territory, while being rare (S1) in Saskatchewan and imperiled (S2) in Nova Scotia and New Brunswick. In coastal Alaska, the species can be found growing on tree trunks, particularly those of Sitka spruce (Picea sitchensis) and Western hemlock (Tsuga heterophylla) in high-elevation forests. In British Columbia, it occurs in the Spruce-Willow-Birch biogeoclimactic zone.

In Greenland, N. arcticum grows among mosses on soil in dwarf shrub heath. Nitrogen fixation by its cyanobacterial partner enables N. arcticum to outcompete neighbouring plants and colonise moss-covered rocks in nutrient-poor environments. The species reaches its largest sizes and produces abundant reproductive structures in arctic climates. It is classed as a "somewhat oceanic lichen", occurring most frequently in oceanic areas and more rarely in continental areas. One study of nearly 300 species of Western Carpathian flora (including vascular plants, bryophytes, and terrestrial lichens) suggests that Nephroma arcticum is one of the few species with a high probability of being a glacial relict. It is rare in the United Kingdom.

== Ecology ==
Nephroma arcticum plays ecological roles in arctic and subarctic environments through its symbiotic relationships, nitrogen fixation in nutrient-poor soils, environmental adaptations, and interactions with diverse organisms.

=== Microbial associations and community structure ===
The bacterial communities associated with the thalli of Nephroma arcticum have been investigated. The composition of the identified endophytic and epiphytic bacterial groups changes depending on from where on the thallus they are sampled. Members of the Alphaproteobacteria, Betaproteobacteria, Gammaproteobacteria, Acidobacteria, Actinobacteria, Firmicutes, and Bacteroidetes are all components of the microbiota of Nephroma arcticum.

Nephroma arcticum hosts several lichenicolous fungi, including Everniicola flexispora, which creates bleached spots with dark rims. It has been recorded from the Murmansk Oblast, the Sayan Mountains, and from Finland and Norway. Another is Lichenopeltella lobariae, which infects the underside of the thallus, including the rhizines.

A 2013 study found that N. arcticum associates with unique Nostoc photobiont strains, unlike most other cyanolichens, suggesting specialised symbiotic relationships. As a trimembered lichen, where Nostoc is an accessory photobiont confined to cephalodia, the species showed different photobiont association patterns compared to bimembered lichens where Nostoc is the primary photobiont. The study also found that photobiont association patterns can vary geographically even when both partners are present, suggesting that environmental factors may influence symbiont selection.

=== Environmental adaptations ===
Nephroma arcticum has evolved a distinctive way of managing sunlight exposure. Its thallus reflects more sunlight across all wavelengths compared to other lichens and typical plant leaves, with especially high reflection of near-infrared light. When wet, the lichen reflects less photosynthetically active radiation than when dry. This reflective capability helps prevent the lichen from overheating and drying out during intense sunlight periods, allowing it to maintain photosynthesis throughout the brief arctic summer season.

A 2023 experimental study examining N. arcticum's responses to winter stress found that the species showed physiological activity during winter thaws, unlike some other lichens that remained dormant. The fungal and algal components of the lichen responded differently to freezing stress: while respiration was unaffected by freezing, the photosynthetic capacity of the algal partner declined, suggesting differential stress responses between the symbiotic partners. The species demonstrated changes in fatty acid composition in response to freezing stress, particularly showing increases in longer-chain fatty acids such as c18:1(n–7) (vaccenic acid), c20:5(n–3) (eicosapentaenoic acid), and c24:1, which may play a protective role against freezing damage.

=== Photosynthesis and nitrogen metabolism ===
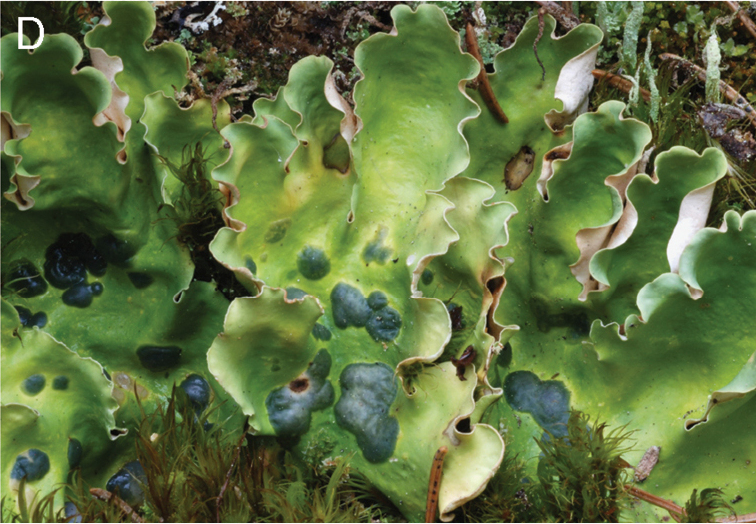
The large cephalodia, although internal, are clearly visible through the upper cortex of the hydrated thallus.

The lobes of Nephroma arcticum absorb and use light similarly to green leaves in vascular plants; scientists have conducted several studies to understand how this lichen processes nitrogen. Researchers compared how populations living at different elevations performed photosynthesis to investigate their adaptations to different environments. The study found that alpine populations, which grow at higher elevations, needed more light to begin photosynthesising and contained less chlorophyll than their subalpine counterparts growing at lower elevations. Both populations showed a "temperate" rather than an "arctic" CO_{2} exchange response.

A 2021 study on Nephroma arcticum evaluated photosynthetic activity on both the upper and lower surfaces of its thallus using measurements of how the lichen's chlorophyll responds to light (chlorophyll fluorescence analysis). Traditionally, such measurements are recorded from the green upper side, which contains photosynthetic pigments, while the lower side is usually grey, dark-brown, or black. The study revealed that photosynthesis happens not just on the green upper surface, but also on the grey lower surface where the lichen's edges curl up. The two sides process light differently. The upper side of the leaf is better at two things: converting light into energy through its main photosynthetic machinery (called Photosystem II) and protecting itself from too much light (through a process called non-photochemical quenching, or NPQ). The lower side, meanwhile, excels at efficiently using light energy when adapting to changing light conditions, and tends to release excess light energy as heat through passive processes. Photosynthesis was not detected on the melanised lower side in the basal thallus zone attached to the substrate.

In a related study, researchers compared growth patterns between Nephroma arcticum and Peltigera aphthosa. The amount of nitrogen was similar in both old and new parts of the thallus, but N. arcticum put more resources into growing fungal tissue instead of producing chlorophyll compared to P. aphthosa. The slower growth rates of N. arcticum were explained by their lower nitrogen and chlorophyll concentrations and subsequently lower light energy conversion efficiency. Building on this research, another study examined how N. arcticum responds to both too much and too little nitrogen. For three months, researchers watered the lichen with different forms of nitrogen that could be tracked using special isotopes. They used a total of 500 milligrams of nitrogen per square metre. Nitrogen deprivation was induced by removing the nitrogen-fixing cephalodia. The study found that while both forms of nitrogen stress affected thallus expansion rates, N. arcticum maintained a balanced tissue nitrogen concentration despite large variations in nitrogen supply.

In a long-term study, thalli of N. arcticum were transplanted between a high-elevation alpine heath and a low-elevation subalpine mountain birch forest in northern Swedish Lapland and harvested after eight years. Considerable differences were found between control samples in how the lichens used energy (measured through dark respiration rates and photon use efficiencies) and how much light they needed to begin photosynthesis, suggesting that these lichens had adapted to their local environments through changes in their metabolism, even though their genetic makeup remained the same.

=== Ecological interactions ===
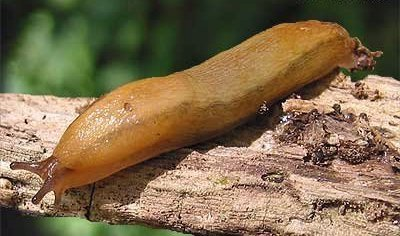
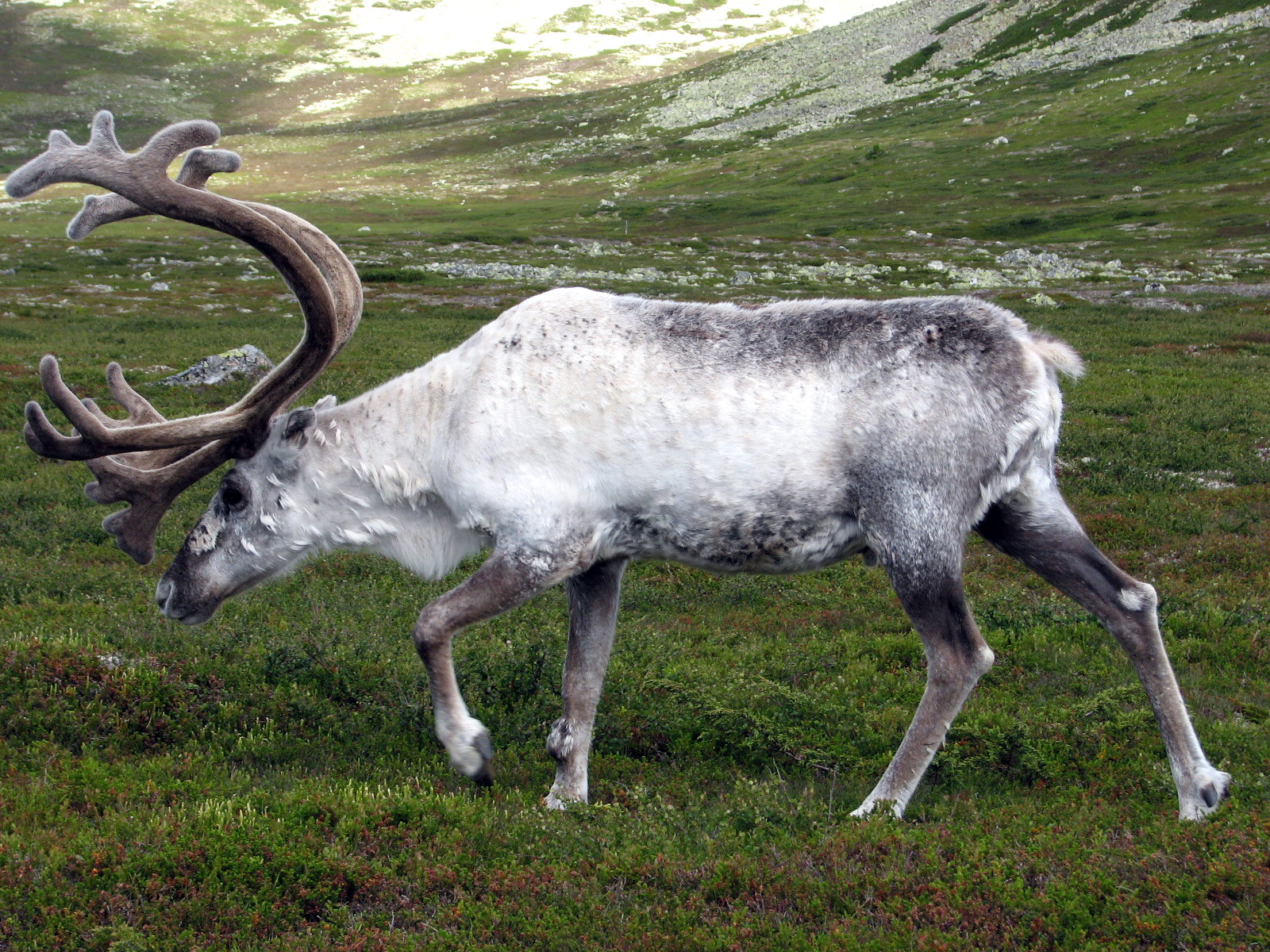
Both the slug Arion subfuscus and reindeer in Sweden have been documented utilising Nephroma arcticum as a food source.

Nephroma arcticum serves as a food source for reindeer in northern Sweden, and for mountain goats in North America. The slug species Arion fuscus grazes on the lichen, favouring nitrogen-rich cyanobacterial parts with fewer defensive compounds. Cephalodia grazing may lead to nitrogen starvation and reduced thallus growth in southern areas where lichenivorous gastropods are more common. This may play a role in shaping the southern distribution limit of this arctic-boreal species.

A 2021 transplant experiment at the species' southern range margin found temperature does not directly limit N. arcticum's distribution. Instead, gastropod grazing on nitrogen-rich cyanobacterial areas limited its range, though the lichen thrived in warmer, moist microclimates. This suggests that biotic pressures, not temperature intolerance, may shape the species' southern limits.

Recent research has highlighted cyanobacterial variability within N. arcticum. This lichen, symbiotic with green algae and cyanobacteria, shows significant cyanobacterial genetic diversity across its cephalodia. The study found high cyanobacterial variability within and among thalli, suggesting a low level of symbiotic specialisation. This variability may help N. arcticum adapt to diverse and changing environments. The study shows that green algae drive photosynthesis in N. arcticum, while cyanobacteria focus on nitrogen fixation.

== Conservation status ==
Globally, the species is considered secure (G5), with this status last reviewed in 2013. It has no special status under the U.S. Endangered Species Act or from the Committee on the Status of Endangered Wildlife in Canada (COSEWIC).

== Traditional uses ==
Indigenous Alaskans historically used N. arcticum as both food and medicine, often boiling it and serving it with crushed fish eggs. The Yup'ik people, who have inhabited western Alaska for generations, know this lichen as kus'koak and have traditionally incorporated it into their practices. According to the ethnobotanist Wendell Hillman Oswalt, the lichen, after having been cooked in water, was fed "to a person in a weak condition to make him strong".

== See also ==
- List of lichens named by Carl Linnaeus
