= Nephroma flavorhizinatum =

Scientific classification
- Kingdom: Fungi
- Division: Ascomycota
- Class: Lecanoromycetes
- Order: Peltigerales
- Family: Peltigeraceae
- Genus: Nephroma
- Species: N. flavorhizinatum

Binomial name
- Nephroma flavorhizinatum Q.Tian & H.Y.Wang (2011)

Species of lichen

Nephroma flavorhizinatum is a species of terricolous (ground-dwelling) foliose lichen in the family Peltigeraceae. Described as new to science in 2011, it is only known to occur in the Tibetan Plateau.

== Taxonomy ==
Nephroma flavorhizinatum was formally described as a new species in 2011 by Qiong Tian and Hai-Ying Wang, based on specimens collected from the Tibetan Plateau. While several other Nephroma species have laminal lobules or white to yellow medulla (such as N. chubutense, N. laevigatum, N. tangeriense, and N. venosum), N. flavorhizinatum is distinguished from these relatives by its unique combination of rhizines and chemical composition. The holotype specimen is preserved in the lichen section of botanical herbarium at Shandong Normal University (SDNU).

Molecular phylogenetics analysis based on nuclear ribosomal DNA internal transcribed spacer sequences confirms the distinctiveness of this species. N. flavorhizinatum forms a sister group to the clade containing N. helveticum and N. isidiosum. This molecular evidence supports the morphological characters that initially led to its recognition as a distinct species. The analysis suggests that while N. flavorhizinatum shares a common ancestor with N. helveticum and its allies, it has evolved along its own independent path.

== Description ==
Nephroma flavorhizinatum is a foliose (leaf-like) lichen that forms a leathery thallus about 4 cm in diameter. The thallus consists of irregular lobes that are 2–10 mm wide and tend to curve upward at their edges. The upper surface is brown and smooth, with a distinctive white, powdery coating (known as pruina) visible along the lobe margins and on the reproductive structures.

A key identifying feature of this species is the presence of small, flattened outgrowths called lobules, which occur both along the margins and on the surface of the thallus. These lobules develop from tiny, finger-like projections and can grow to 0.2–1 mm in width, with some becoming branched.

The internal structure of the thallus is composed of several distinct layers. The upper cortex is pale brown and approximately 35 μm thick. Below this lies a layer containing the photobiont (Nostoc) that is about 65 μm thick. The medulla is white and contains abundant water-soluble crystals, measuring around 80 μm in thickness. The lower cortex is pale and relatively thin at about 30 μm.

The interior layer (medulla) of the lichen varies in colour from white to golden yellow. The lower surface is dark brown and fuzzy, becoming lighter and smoother near the edges. It produces distinctive brush-like attachments called rhizines, which are approximately 3 mm long and show a characteristic two-toned colouration: golden yellow at their bases and white at their tips.

The species reproduces sexually through kidney-shaped structures called apothecia (fruiting bodies), which are common and appear sunken into the lower surface at the tips of the lobes. These apothecia are usually upright, with dark brown discs measuring 1–4 mm across and often covered with short, fuzzy hairs. Each reproductive structure contains spore sacs (asci) with eight ascospores each. The individual spores are pale brown and divided into four sections by three cross-walls (septa), measuring 15–20 by 3.5–5 μm.

When tested with common chemical reagents used in lichen identification (spot tests, the species shows distinctive reactions. Most notably, both the golden yellow portions of the medulla and the bases of the rhizines turn violet when potassium hydroxide solution (K) is applied, helping to distinguish this species from its relatives.

== Habitat and distribution ==
Nephroma flavorhizinatum is known only from its type locality in the Tibetan Plateau, specifically in Litang, Sichuan Province, China. It grows at high elevations, having been collected at an altitude of 4,200 m (13,800 ft) above sea level. The species is terricolous, meaning it grows directly on soil rather than on rocks or trees. Multiple specimens have been documented from the type locality. The original collections include the holotype specimen (collection number 20080755) gathered in November 2008, along with additional specimens (20084011 and 20103317) collected from the same area.

While additional populations may exist in similar high-altitude environments across the Tibetan Plateau, as of its initial description in 2011, the species has only been documented from this single location. This restricted distribution could reflect either the species' genuine rarity and habitat specificity, or it may be due to limited sampling of these remote, high-elevation environments.
