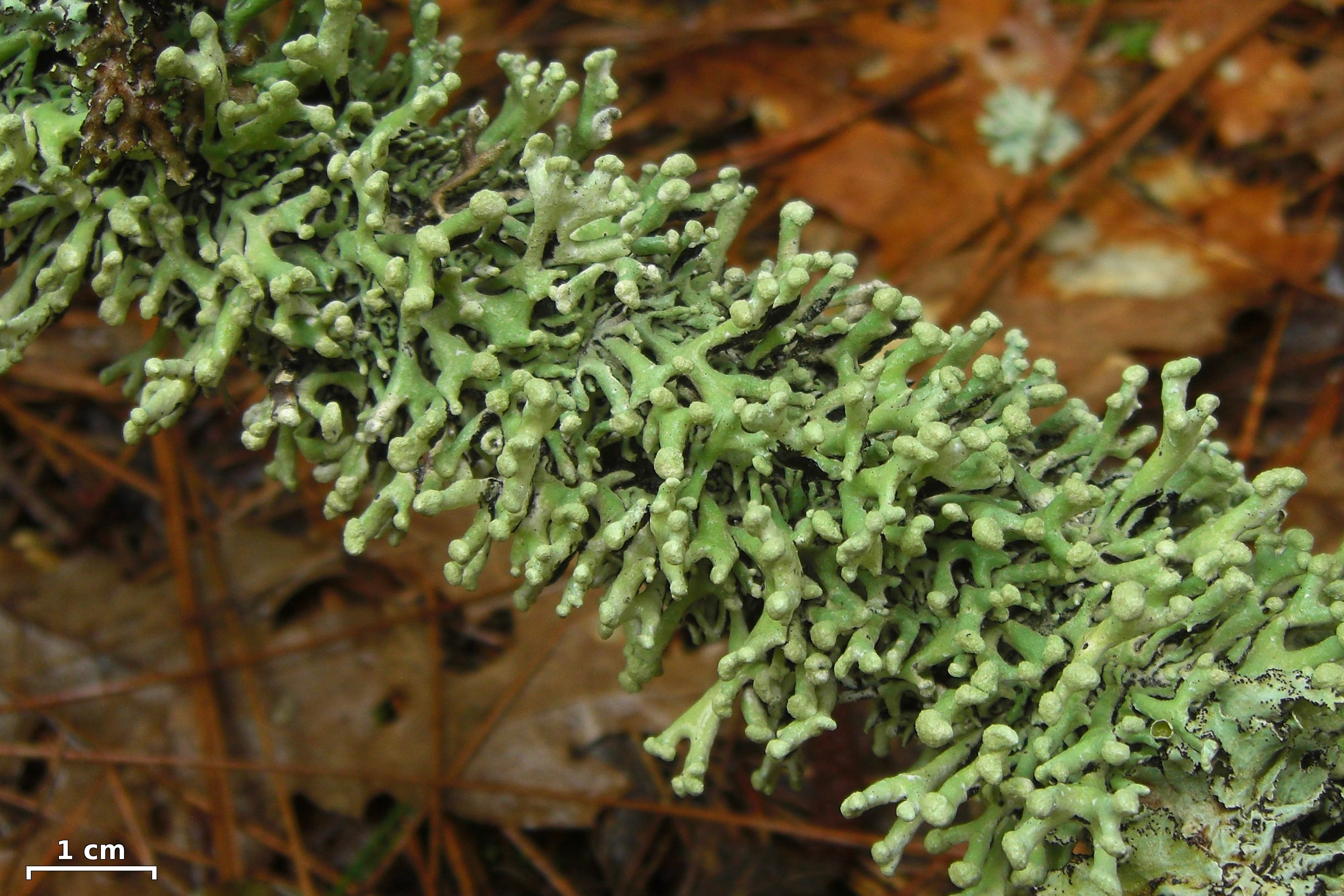

Conservation status
- Secure (NatureServe)

Scientific classification
- Kingdom: Fungi
- Division: Ascomycota
- Class: Lecanoromycetes
- Order: Lecanorales
- Family: Parmeliaceae
- Genus: Hypogymnia
- Species: H. tubulosa

Binomial name
- Hypogymnia tubulosa (Schaer.) Hav. (1918)

Synonyms
- Parmelia ceratophylla var. tubulosa Schaer. (1840)

= Hypogymnia tubulosa =

Species of lichen

Hypogymnia tubulosa is a species of foliose lichen in the family Parmeliaceae. Ludwig Emanuel Schaerer formally described it in 1840 as a variety of Parmelia ceratophylla. Johan Johnsen Havaas promoted it to distinct species status in 1918.

The lichenicolous fungus Tremella tubulosae, described as a new species in 2020, has been recorded in Scotland and Spain. It causes the formation of distinct, convex, dark brown to blackish galls on the surface of the host thallus.

== Chemistry ==
Hypogymnia tubulosa contains several secondary chemicals, including four depsidones (3-hydroxyphysodic, 4-O-methyl physodic acid, physodic and physodalic acid), and two depsides (atranorin and chloroatranorin). Other metabolites that have been identified are atranol, chloroatranol, atraric acid, olivetol, olivetonide and 3-hydroxyolivetonide.
