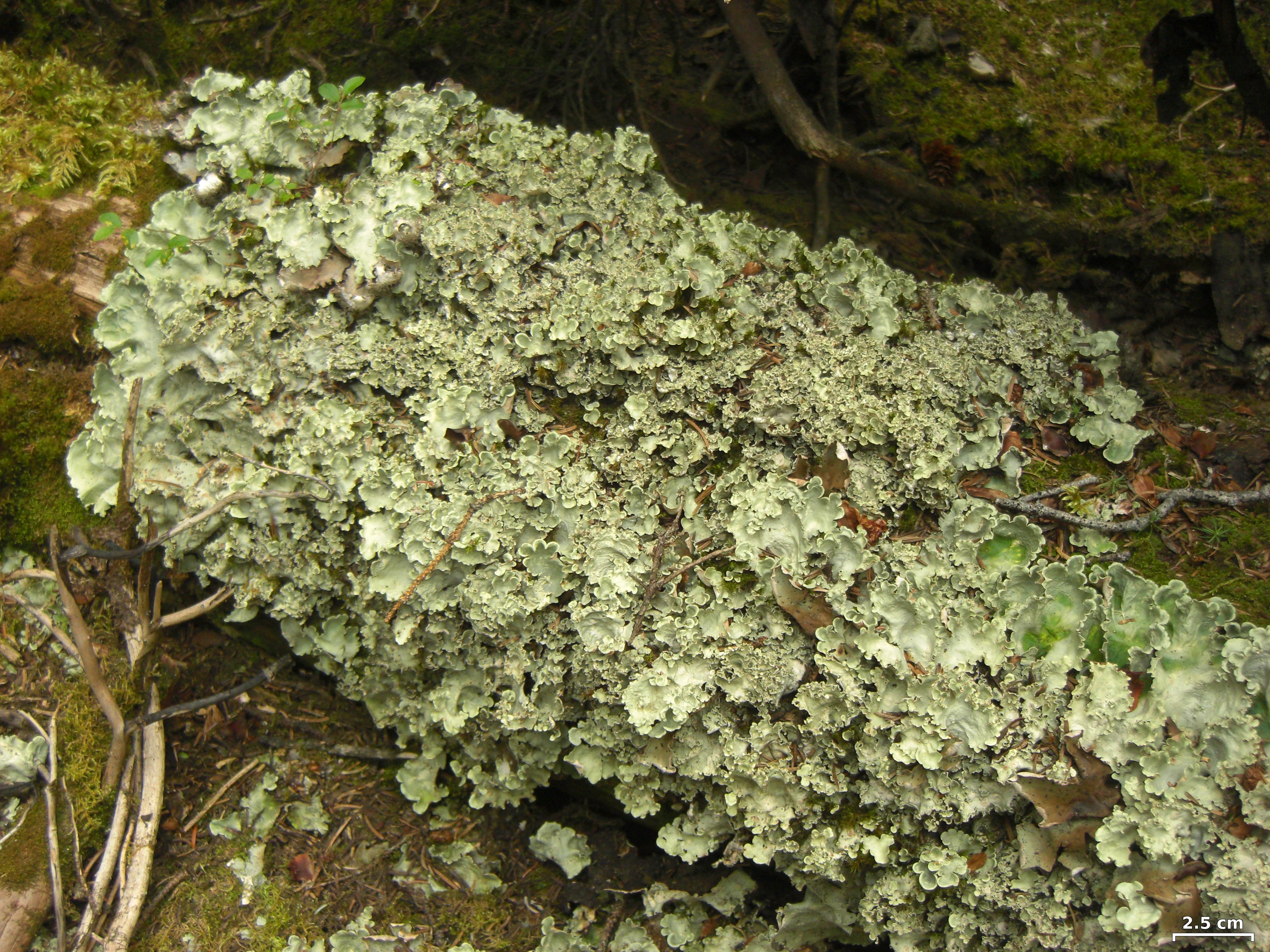
- Nephroma arcticum

Scientific classification
- Domain: Eukaryota
- Kingdom: Fungi
- Division: Ascomycota
- Class: Lecanoromycetes
- Order: Peltigerales
- Family: Peltigeraceae
- Genus: Nephroma; Ach. (1809)

Type species
- Nephroma arcticum (L.) Torss. (1843)

Species
- See text

Synonyms
- Dermatodea Vent. (1799); Peltidea subdiv. Opisteria Ach. (1803); Opisteria (Ach.) Vain. (1909); Nephromatomyces E.A.Thomas (1939); Nephromiomyces E.A.Thomas ex Cif. & Tomas. (1953); Ornatinephroma Gyeln. (1934)

= Nephroma =

Genus of lichens

Nephroma is a genus of medium to large foliose lichens. The genus has a widespread distribution. They are sometimes called kidney lichens, named after the characteristic kidney-shaped apothecia that they produce on the lower surface of their lobe tips, which often curl upwards and thus are visible from above. Sterile specimens that do not have apothecia can look somewhat like Melanelia, Peltigera, Platismatia, or Asahinea. Most species grow either on mossy ground or rocks, or on trees.

All species of Nephroma contain cyanobacteria (in the genus Nostoc) as a photobiont, which allows the organism to fix nitrogen. In some species the cyanobacteria is the sole photobiont, while other species also contain a green alga photobiont (Coccomyxa) and the cyanobacteria is restricted to warty cephalodia on the upper or lower surface of the lichen.

== Description ==
Species of Nephroma have a stratified foliose thallus with a cortex that is well-developed on both the upper and lower surfaces. The fruit bodies (apothecia) are formed on the lower surface of the thallus, which is later curved backward to expose the hymenium (spore-bearing surface). Initially, the ascomata are immersed with a vegetative covering that splits open at later stages of development. In contrast to all other groups of Peltigerales, the asci of Nephroma have neither a gelatinous coat nor an iodine-positive apical ring. The brown ascospores are elongated, and have a crosswise partition (septa). Reproductive structures called soredia, isidia, or lobules are present in most species.

The lower surface shows important diagnostic features that vary between species. Some species have a thin layer of very short hairs called pseudotomentum, while others have a distinct mat of longer hairs called tomentum. In species like N. resupinatum, scattered white papillae are visible on the lower surface. These features, along with the presence and nature of reproductive structures (soredia, isidia), are key characteristics for species identification.

== Chemistry ==
Species of Nephroma can contain various triterpenoid compounds that are taxonomically significant and helpful for species identification. Chemical analysis through thin-layer chromatography is sometimes necessary to distinguish between morphologically similar species.

The presence and combinations of specific triterpenoids can be diagnostic. For example, N. orvoi contains triterpenoids T1, T3, T4, and T6, while the similar-looking N. parile contains T2, T3, and T5. Similarly, N. tangeriense contains both zeorin (also known as T3) and dolichorrhizin (T6), while N. laevigatum in the Nordic region contains only dolichorrhizin.

Some species can only be reliably distinguished through chemical analysis. For instance, N. helveticum and N. tropicum are morphologically identical but can be differentiated by their triterpenoid content, with N. helveticum containing compounds U1 and U2, while N. tropicum contains U1 and U3. N. resupinatum is notable for lacking secondary metabolites entirely, which helps distinguish it from similar species.

== Photobionts ==
Nephroma species form symbiotic relationships with photosynthetic partners (photobionts) that are essential to their survival. All Nephroma species contain cyanobacteria from the genus Nostoc, which not only provide products of photosynthesis but also fix nitrogen from the atmosphere, making it available to the lichen. Some species, known as tripartite lichens, also contain a green algal partner from the genus Coccomyxa, while others (bipartite lichens) contain only Nostoc.

Research has shown that the Nostoc partners in Nephroma fall into two distinct genetic groups that correlate with the lichen's lifestyle. One group is found exclusively in bipartite species that typically grow on tree bark or rocks, while the other group occurs in tripartite species that usually grow on soil or among mosses. This pattern holds true across wide geographic areas – specimens of the same Nephroma species collected from different continents often contain nearly identical Nostoc strains. The green algal partners (Coccomyxa) in tripartite species show remarkably little genetic variation across different Nephroma species and geographic regions. These algae are closely related to some free-living species, including certain algae that live within the cells of Ginkgo biloba trees.

Evolutionary studies have revealed that transitions between bipartite and tripartite forms in Nephroma's evolutionary history were complex events. When a species gained or lost the ability to partner with green algae, it also had to change the type of Nostoc it associated with, suggesting that these transitions required concurrent changes in both photobiont partnerships.

== Species ==
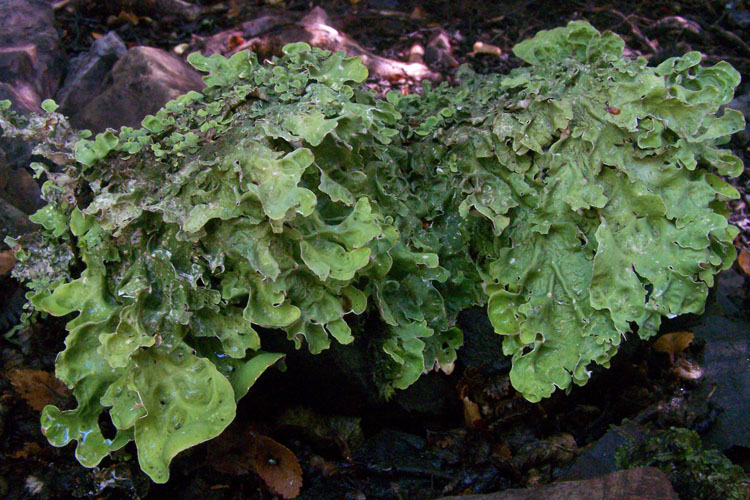
Nephroma australe growing on Isla Navarino, Chile

- Nephroma arcticum (L.) Torss. (1843)
- Nephroma australe A.Rich. (1832)
- Nephroma bellum (Spreng.) Tuck. (1841)
- Nephroma cellulosum (Ach.) Ach. (1810)
- Nephroma expallidum (Nyl.) Nyl. (1865)
- Nephroma flavorhizinatum Q.Tian & H.Y.Wang (2011)
- Nephroma helveticum Ach. (1810)
- Nephroma isidiosum (Nyl.) Gyeln. (1931)
- Nephroma laevigatum Ach. (1814)
- Nephroma orvoi Timdal, M.Westb., Haugan, Hofton, Holien, Speed, Tønsberg & Bendiksby (2020)
- Nephroma parile (Ach.) Ach. (1810)
- Nephroma resupinatum (L.) Ach. (1810)
- Nephroma rufum (C.Bab.) P.James (1983)
- Nephroma subhelveticum H.Y.Wang (2013)
- Nephroma tangeriense (Maheu & A.Gillet) Gattefossé & Werner (1931)
- Nephroma tropicum (Müll.Arg.) Zahlbr. (1925)

== Evolution and biogeography ==
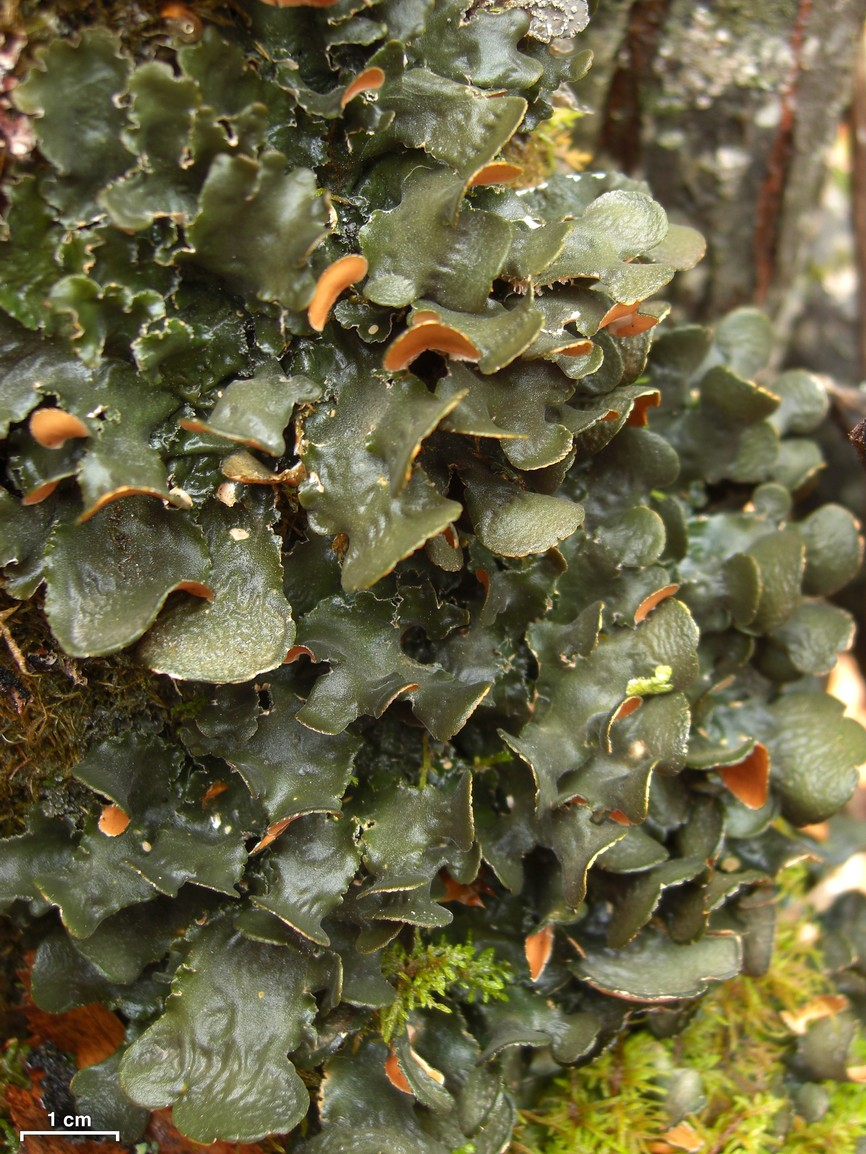
Nephroma resupinatum in Wells Gray Provincial Park, British Columbia

A 2011 phylogenetic study of Nephroma species in Macaronesia (the Azores, Madeira, and Canary Islands) revealed evidence of recent evolutionary radiation and neoendemism in the region. The study found that all five Macaronesian endemic species evolved relatively recently (within the last 19 million years) after the formation of the volcanic islands, rather than being ancient relict species. These endemic species belong to two distinct lineages, each associated with a widespread Holarctic species (N. parile or N. laevigatum). The research suggested that Macaronesia may have served as a source for subsequent colonisation of continental areas, with evidence of recent dispersal events from the islands to Western North America and the Mediterranean Basin. This represents the first documented case of neo-endemism in lichenised fungi from Macaronesia.

Broader evolutionary studies have revealed complex patterns in how Nephroma species develop and maintain their symbiotic partnerships. While the fungal partners (mycobionts) of tripartite species do not form a single evolutionary group, their photosynthetic partners show strict patterns of association. This suggests that the evolution of different symbiotic forms in Nephroma was not a simple matter of gaining or losing a green algal partner. Instead, any shift between bipartite and tripartite forms required simultaneous changes in both the green algal and cyanobacterial partnerships.

The genus also shows distinct ecological patterns in its evolution. Species that grow on trees or rocks (epiphytic or lithophytic species) consistently associate with one genetic group of Nostoc partners, while soil-dwelling species partner with a different group. This pattern holds true across continents, suggesting that these specific partnerships evolved early in the genus's history and have remained stable over long periods. Despite this specialisation in symbiotic partners, the fungal components of Nephroma species can show considerable genetic variation within species, particularly in temperate regions.

== Uses ==
Several species of Nephroma are restricted to pristine, old-growth forests, and thus are important indicator species that have already influenced some forest management decisions. Nephroma occultum is listed as vulnerable in Canada by COSEWIC.

One species of Nephroma has been found to produce a brown dye, while another is recorded as being used in Scotland to produce a blue dye for wool. Nephroma arcticum is called kusskoak by the Yup'ik of Alaska, and it is traditionally eaten after being boiled with crushed fish eggs. A medicinal tea is also made from the lichen, and is reputed to be a powerful medicine to return strength to a person who is in a weak condition. N. arcticum contains several antifreeze proteins that have been patented by the Dutch multinational corporation Unilever for their ability to modify the growth of ice crystals; these proteins have been used to improve the texture of low-fat ice cream.
