= Nephroma cellulosum =

Scientific classification
- Kingdom: Fungi
- Division: Ascomycota
- Class: Lecanoromycetes
- Order: Peltigerales
- Family: Peltigeraceae
- Genus: Nephroma
- Species: N. cellulosum

Binomial name
- Nephroma cellulosum (Ach.) Ach. (1810)

Synonyms
- Peltidea cellulosa Ach. (1803); Lichen scutatus * cellulosa (Ach.) Lam. (1813); Nephromium cellulosum (Ach.) Nyl. (1858); Opisteria cellulosa (Ach.) Vain. (1909); Nephroma cellulosum var. isidioferum Js.Murray (1960)

Species of lichen-forming fungus

Nephroma cellulosum is a species of foliose lichen in the family Peltigeraceae. It is found in the Southern Hemisphere, where it grows on the bark of southern beech (Nothofagus) trees in humid forests of New Zealand, Australia, and southern Chile. The lichen is recognisable by its olive-brown to reddish-brown colour and its distinctive upper surface, which is deeply ridged and pitted in a honeycomb-like pattern. It was first described by the Swedish lichenologist Erik Acharius in 1803, based on material collected from near the Strait of Magellan.

== Taxonomy ==
Nephroma cellulosum was first published by Erik Acharius in his 1803 work Methodus qua omnes detectos lichenes as Peltidea? cellulosa. He placed it among his Species dubiae ('dubious species') and adopted James Edward Smith's manuscript name Lichen cellulosus, altering the epithet to agree with the genus. Acharius said that he had not seen the material himself and was unsure whether it was distinct from Cetraria lacunosa; he reported it from the Strait of Magellan based on a collection by Archibald Menzies.

In 1810, Acharius transferred the taxon to Nephroma, listing it as Nephroma cellulosa while still keeping it among his Species dubiae. He again cited Smith's name as Lichen cellulosus in litteris (in correspondence) and gave a short diagnosis: a greenish thallus with a net-like, cellular surface, a bare white underside that is blistered or bullate, and apothecia with a red disc. He also noted that it was a small species that he had not seen personally, indicating that his concept was still based on others' material rather than direct examination.

A phyllidiate form described from New Zealand as Nephroma cellulosum var. isidioferum (J.S.Murray, 1960) has sometimes been treated separately, but is generally regarded as a minor infraspecific variant within the species.

== Description ==
Nephroma cellulosum is a foliose lichen with a robust, rounded to spreading thallus that is typically olive-brown to reddish-brown, greyish-red, or grey, with colour varying according to light exposure. The upper surface is conspicuously ridged and pitted, forming a honeycomb-like (faveolate) pattern, and often bears small leaf-like outgrowths (phyllidia) along the ridges between the pits; these are typically squamiform (scale-shaped) but occasionally terete (cylindrical). These structures may be stalked or unstalked and vary greatly in abundance. The lower surface is whitish, distinctly wrinkled to bullate, and bordered by a smooth, shining margin. Chemical constituents of the medulla are dominated by perlatolic and glomelliferic acids, with several additional secondary metabolites present in smaller amounts; colour reactions reported in earlier literature have not been consistently observed in Australian material.

== Habitat and distribution ==
Nephroma cellulosum has been recorded from the Southern Hemisphere, with confirmed material from New Zealand (including the type collection from Otago) and Australia, and it has also been studied in southern Chile. Where it has been observed in the field, it occurs in humid forest settings on southern beech (Nothofagus), with populations sometimes showing a continuous range of forms that differ mainly in the development of phyllidia and the presence or absence of apothecia. The available evidence suggests that these variants occur together in the same habitats and do not show clear ecological separation.
