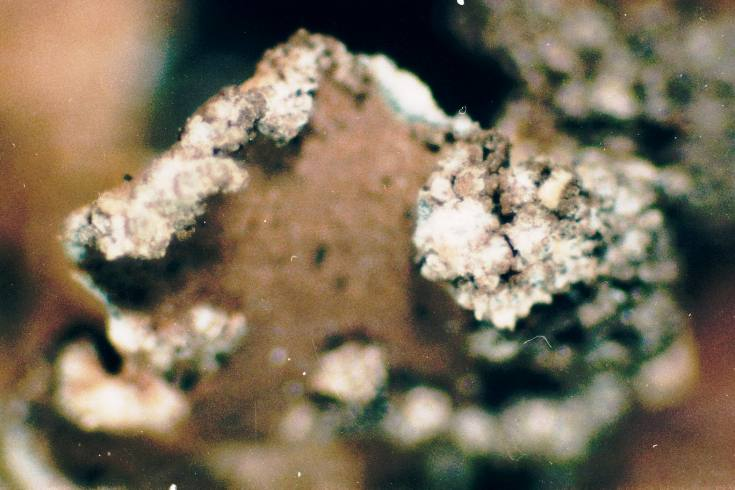

Conservation status
- Secure (NatureServe)

Scientific classification
- Kingdom: Fungi
- Division: Ascomycota
- Class: Lecanoromycetes
- Order: Peltigerales
- Family: Peltigeraceae
- Genus: Nephroma
- Species: N. parile

Binomial name
- Nephroma parile (Ach.) Ach. (1810)

Synonyms
- Lichen parilis Ach. (1799)

= Nephroma parile =

Species of lichen

Nephroma parile is a species of foliose lichen belonging to the family Peltigeraceae.

It has a cosmopolitan distribution.
