= Everniicola =

Scientific classification
- Kingdom: Fungi
- Division: Ascomycota
- Class: incertae sedis
- Order: incertae sedis
- Family: incertae sedis
- Genus: Everniicola; D.Hawksw. (1982)
- Species: E. flexispora

Binomial name
- Everniicola flexispora D.Hawksw. (1982)

Single-species fungal genus

Everniicola is a fungal genus of uncertain placement in the Ascomycota. It comprises a single species, Everniicola flexispora, a lichenicolous (lichen-dwelling) fungus. The genus and its species were described in 1982 by David Leslie Hawksworth. The fungus was originally described from the lichen host Evernia prunastri. It has also been recorded on Nephroma arcticum, on which its presence results in bleached spots with dark rims.

== Taxonomy ==
Everniicola is a monospecific genus of lichen-dwelling fungi (lichenicolous fungi), erected in 1981 by David L. Hawksworth to accommodate a unique species, Everniicola flexispora. It was originally proposed for placement in the Sphaeropsidales within the coelomycetous fungi—an artificial assemblage of asexual fungi that produce spores in enclosed fruiting bodies known as pycnidia. No previously described genus of coelomycetes was found to be suitable for this fungus, which grows on the thallus of the widespread foliose lichen Evernia prunastri. The genus is now considered to be of uncertain placement in the Ascomycota.

The genus name Everniicola reflects its host association (Evernia) and ecological role (–cola, meaning "dweller"). The genus is distinguished by its unusual conidia, which are L-shaped and flexuose, a morphology not seen in other described lichenicolous coelomycetes.

== Description ==
Everniicola flexispora produces small, inconspicuous fruiting bodies (conidiomata) that form within brown necrotic patches 0.5–1 mm across on the surface of its lichen host. These lesions have a slightly darker brown margin and occur exclusively on the upper surface of the thallus. Within each infected spot, up to 30 immersed fruiting bodies may be present. These are roughly spherical to somewhat cup-shaped (subglobose to cupuliform), 20–40 micrometres (μm) in diameter, and possess a small pore (ostiole) through which spores are released.

The wall of each conidioma is 5–8 μm thick, composed of loosely packed pseudoparenchymatous cells—rounded to angular fungal cells that form tissue-like layers. These cells are pale in colour (subhyaline to light brown), individually 4–6 μm in diameter. Inside the cavity, the spore-producing (conidiogenous) cells line the inner wall densely. These are hyaline (transparent), non-proliferating, flask-like (phialidic) cells, shaped either globose or with a short neck, measuring 2.5–4 μm across.

The asexual spores (conidia) are the most distinctive feature of this fungus. They are hyaline, smooth-walled, and measure 8–10(–11.5) μm long by 1.5–2 μm wide. Although broadly cylindrical, they are characteristically bent—often at a sharp angle, giving them an L-shaped or hook-like appearance. The conidia are mostly single-celled but may occasionally be septate (divided into two or three cells), and they do not aggregate into chains or become embedded in mucilage.

== Habitat and distribution ==
Everniicola flexispora is a lichenicolous fungus known only from its type locality in Pembrokeshire, Wales, where it was found growing on the thallus of Evernia prunastri—a common epiphytic lichen that inhabits tree branches in humid, temperate environments. The type specimen was collected in 1970 from beech twigs near Orielton. The fungus has additionally been documented from Alaska, the Murmansk Oblast, the Sayan Mountains, from Finland and Norway, and from Germany.

This fungus co-occurs on the same thallus as Lichenoconium erodens, another lichenicolous coelomycete. However, the two can be easily distinguished: Lichenoconium forms larger, more emergent fruiting bodies with no well-defined lesion margins, unlike the discrete patches and immersed pycnidia of Everniicola. There is no evidence that E. flexispora causes significant damage to its host, but it does produce visible necrotic lesions and may mildly parasitise the lichen tissues.

== See also ==
- List of Ascomycota genera incertae sedis
