= Lichenopeltella lobariae =

Scientific classification
- Kingdom: Fungi
- Division: Ascomycota
- Class: Dothideomycetes
- Order: Microthyriales
- Family: Microthyriaceae
- Genus: Lichenopeltella
- Species: L. lobariae

Binomial name
- Lichenopeltella lobariae Etayo & Diederich (1996)

Species of lichen

Lichenopeltella lobariae is a species of lichenicolous (lichen-dwelling) fungus in the family Microthyriaceae. It grows exclusively on foliose lichen species, including Lobaria pulmonaria and Nephroma arcticum.

== Taxonomy ==
The species was first discovered during studies of fungi growing on lichens in the western Pyrenees mountains of France and Spain. It was formally described as a new species in 1996 by the mycologists Javier Etayo and Paul Diederich. The type specimen (holotype) was collected near Aspe peak in France at an elevation of 1,350 metres in a mixed beech-fir forest.

== Description ==
Lichenopeltella lobariae produces small, round to ellipsoid fruiting bodies called catathecia that measure 75–110 micrometres (μm) in diameter and are about 45 μm tall. These structures are scattered across the surface of the host lichen and can be seen with a hand lens. The upper wall of the catathecia is dark brown with a greyish tinge when treated with potassium hydroxide solution (K+) and is composed of rectangular or square cells arranged in radiating rows.

Around the spore-releasing pore (ostiole), there are 5–8 converging bristles called setae that measure 13-22 μm long. These setae are dark brown, thin-walled, and smooth, becoming swollen at their base but tapering toward the tip. The spore-producing structures (asci) are broadly club-shaped, somewhat curved, and contain eight spores each. The asci measure 33–43 by 9–10 μm. The spores themselves are hyaline (colourless), ellipsoid in shape, divided into two cells (1-septate), and measure 11–15 by 3–3.5 μm. Each spore typically has three pairs of small, hair-like appendages called setulae.

== Habitat and distribution ==
Lichenopeltella lobariae has initially found growing on the lower surface of Lobaria pulmonaria thalli (the main body of the lichen), specifically in areas that lack the characteristic woolly covering (tomentum) typical of this lichen species. At the time of its initial description, it was only known from two localities: one in France and one in Spain. The species appears to be closely related to L. santessonii, but can be distinguished by its smaller spores and the presence of setulae, as well as its different host preference, as L. santessonii grows on Peltigera species. In 2014, its known geographic and host range was expanded when it was reported in the Irkutsk region of Russia growing on Nephroma arcticum, and from Ecuador.
