= Nephroarctin =

Chemical compound found in some lichens

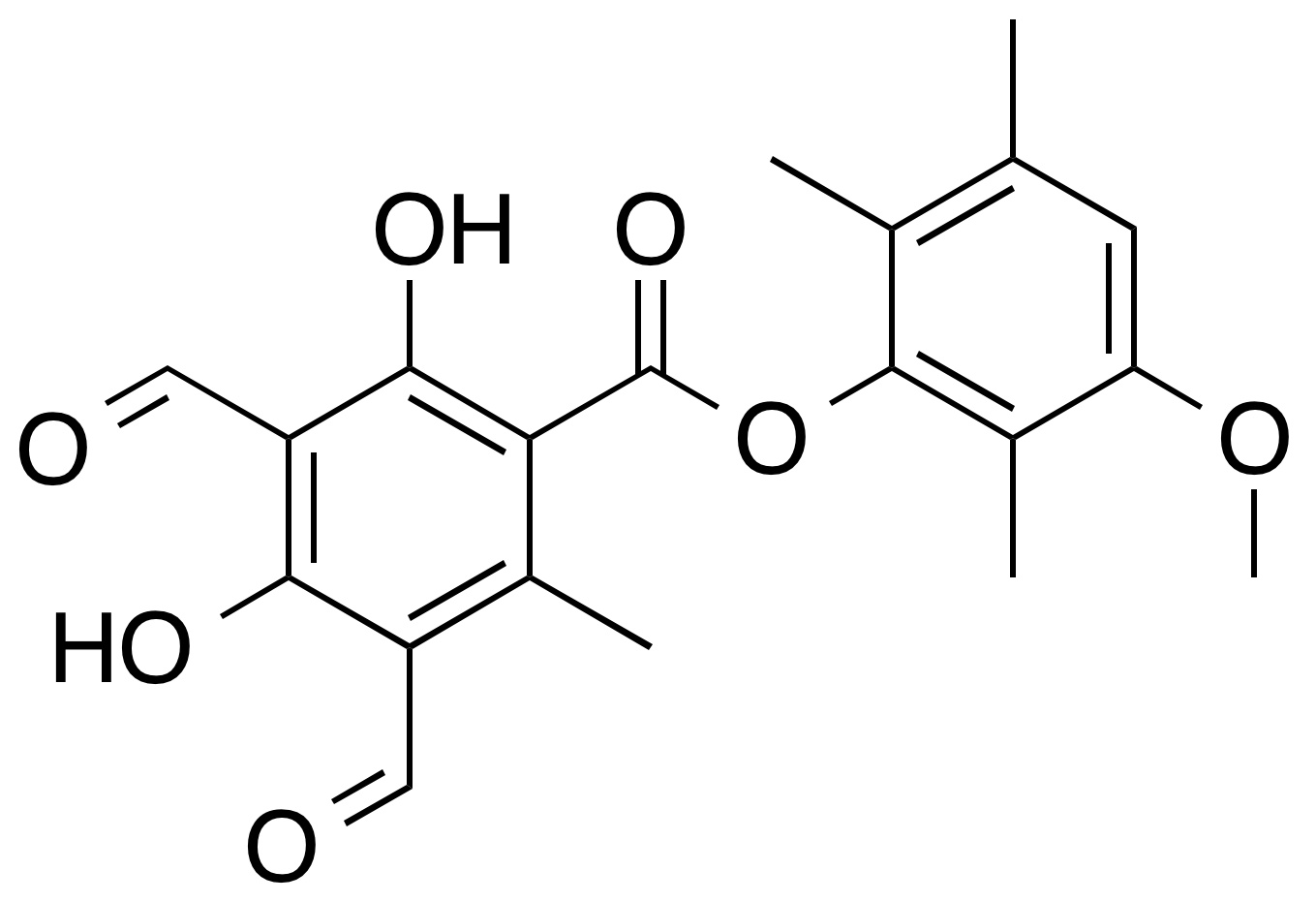

Names
- IUPAC name (3-Methoxy-2,5,6-trimethylphenyl) 3,5-diformyl-2,4-dihydroxy-6-methylbenzoate
- Other names 3-Methoxy-2,5,6-trimethylphenyl 3,5-diformyl-6-methyl-β-resorcylate

Identifiers
CAS Number	23004-60-6
3D model (JSmol)	Interactive image
ChEBI	CHEBI:144177
ChemSpider	519171
PubChem CID	597224
- InChI: InChI=1S/C20H20O7/c1-9-6-15(26-5)12(4)19(10(9)2)27-20(25)16-11(3)13(7-21)17(23)14(8-22)18(16)24/h6-8,23-24H,1-5H3 Key: COJRBNIKTUZKMH-UHFFFAOYSA-N
- SMILES: O=CC=1C(O)=C(C=O)C(=C(C(=O)OC=2C(=C(OC)C=C(C2C)C)C)C1O)C

Properties
Chemical formula	C_{20}H_{20}O_{7}
Molar mass	372.373 g·mol^{−1}
Appearance	small rectangular prisms
Melting point	192–201 °C (378–394 °F; 465–474 K)
Solubility in water	Hot benzene, ethyl acetate, acetone, ether, and chloroform; limited solubility in alcohol
- Except where otherwise noted, data are given for materials in their standard state (at 25 °C [77 °F], 100 kPa). Infobox references

Nephroarctin is a naturally occurring depside compound found in certain foliose lichens, most notably Nephroma arcticum from which it was first isolated in 1969. Along with its related compound phenarctin, it is one of two structurally unusual compounds produced by N. arcticum, both characterised by an uncommonly high number of single-carbon attachments to their core structure. This colourless crystalline substance, with the molecular formula C_{20}H_{20}O_{7}, consists of two benzene rings connected by an ester linkage and plays a role in the lichen's defensive mechanisms. The compound is particularly concentrated in the thallus tips of N. arcticum and N. occultum, with levels varying seasonally in correlation with photosynthetic activity.

== History ==
The chemical investigation of Nephroma arcticum began in the late 19th century with Hesse's isolation of usnic acid and a hydrocarbon called nephrin (C_{20}H_{32}). Zopf later expanded this work by identifying the triterpene compound zeorin. A significant breakthrough came in 1959 when Clifford Wetmore reported a supposed "carotenoid" compound present in 58% of examined specimens – a substance later revealed to be a nephroarctin derivative.

Nephroarctin was first isolated by Mariko Nuno from specimens collected on Mount Ontake in central Honshu, Japan. The structural elucidation was accomplished through collaborative work between the Iatrochemical Research Foundation and Takeda Chemical Industries, with assistance from the lichenologists Yasuhiko Asahina and Shoji Shibata of the University of Tokyo. The compound can be isolated from lichen thalli through a multi-step chemical process. After removal of zeorin through acetone treatment, the compound is purified using silica gel chromatography with a benzene-ethyl acetate mixture. During this separation, nephroarctin elutes after usnic acid but before zeorin and an unidentified compound.

== Distribution and occurrence ==
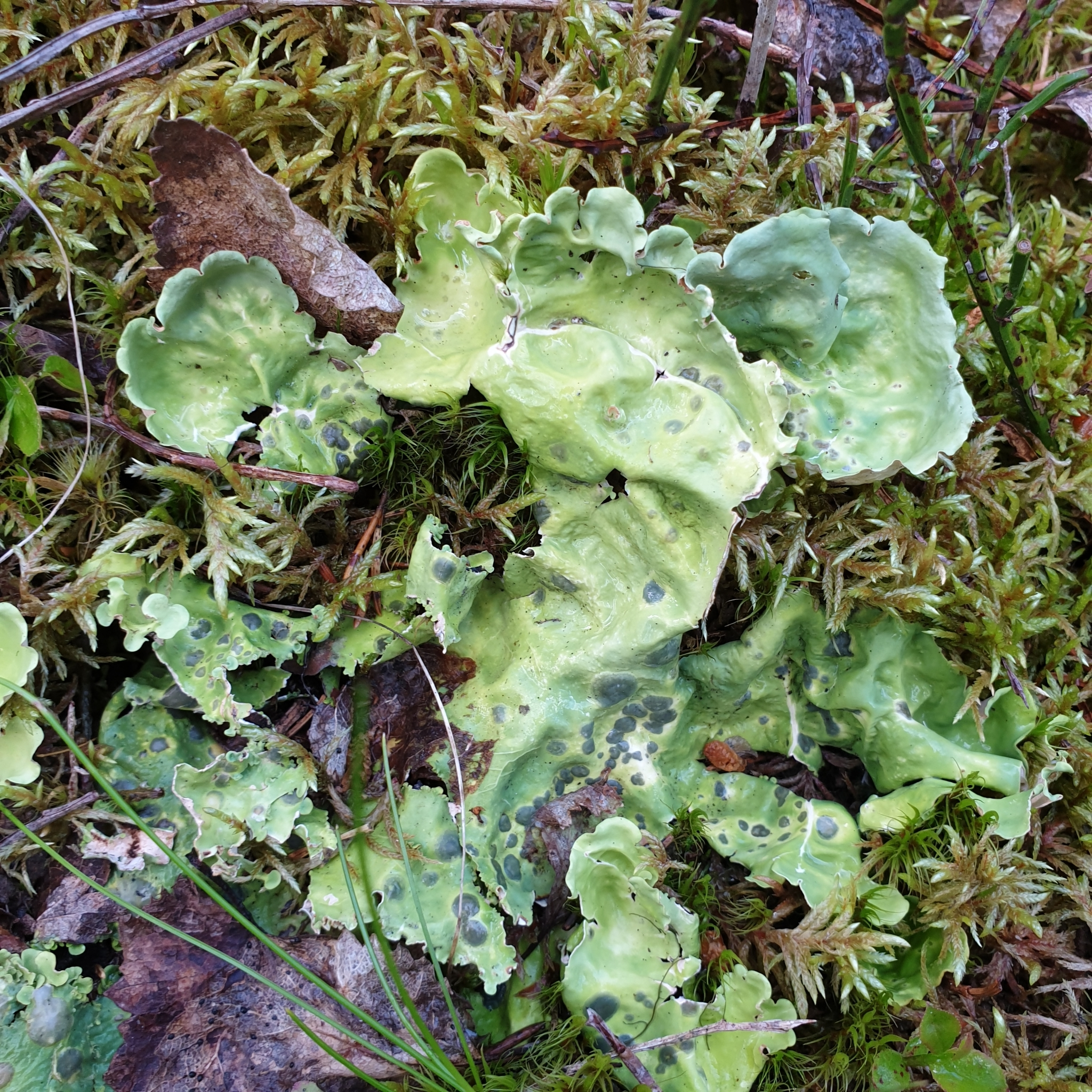
Nephroma arcticum was the first source for nephroarctin.

Nephroarctin occurs primarily in two foliose lichen species. It was first discovered in Nephroma arcticum and later identified in N. occultum, where it coexists with phenarctin, usnic acid, and zeorin. Both species show identical nephroarctin patterns when analysed by thin-layer chromatography, producing characteristic spots at Rf 0.51 and 0.61 that fluoresce under ultraviolet light and show distinctive colour reactions with sulfuric acid, potassium hydroxide, and p-phenylenediamine reagents.

Within individual lichen thalli, nephroarctin's distribution is notably uneven. Concentrations are approximately 90% higher in apical thallus tips compared to basal zones. This spatial variation appears linked to photobiont type, as parts containing green algal photobionts show significantly higher concentrations (5.6 ± 0.7 mg/g) compared to cephalodial parts containing cyanobacteria (2.3 ± 0.4 mg/g). This distribution pattern suggests nephroarctin serves a protective function, defending photobiont-rich regions against lichen-eating gastropods.

The compound's presence is particularly characteristic of N. arcticum specimens containing green algal photobionts, distinguishing them from Nephroma species that contain cyanobacterial (genus Nostoc) photobionts. Temporally, nephroarctin levels show seasonal fluctuation, typically increasing from July to August in correlation with periods of higher photosynthetic activity. This pattern suggests its production may be regulated by the availability of photosynthates and the overall metabolic activity of the lichen.

== Chemical structure and properties ==
=== Molecular structure ===
Nephroarctin is a depside compound whose structure was determined through a combination of spectroscopic analysis and X-ray crystallography. The molecule consists of two benzene rings connected by an ester linkage, with an unusually large number of C_{1} substituents on both rings.

=== Physical properties ===
In its purified form, nephroarctin appears as colourless prismatic crystals with a melting point originally reported as 192–193 °C (378–379 °F); in a 1996 source, it is given with a broader range, 192–201 °C (378–394 °F).

=== Chemical reactivity ===
The compound shows fluorescence under UV light and demonstrates characteristic colour reactions in lichen spot tests: deep yellow with p-phenylenediamine (PD), reddish-brown with ferric chloride in alcohol, and yellow to orange-yellow with potassium hydroxide (K/KC). The homofluorescein reaction is "reluctantly positive".

=== Spectroscopic characteristics ===
The compound's spectroscopic profile includes UV absorption maxima at 238, 281, 315, and 379 nm, with additional maxima at 202, 254, and 344 nm

== Derivatives ==
Several chemical derivatives of nephroarctin have been prepared and characterised:

- Hexa-acetate derivative (C_{32}H_{32}O_{13}): Formed through acetylation, appears as colourless crystals with a melting point of 178–179 °C (352–354 °F).
- Monobromonephroarctin (C_{20}H_{19}BrO_{7}): Produced through bromination, forms colourless prisms with a melting point of 186–187°C. The crystal structure of this derivative was instrumental in confirming the complete structure of nephroarctin, crystallising in the space group P2₁/c with unit cell parameters a = 15.25 Å, b = 14.73 Å, c = 18.18 Å, and β = 104° 15'.
- Hyponephroarctin (C_{2O}H_{22}0_{6}): Has a melting point of 165–170 °C (329–338 °F).
- 2'-0-Methylnephroarctin: Has a melting point of 166 °C (331 °F).
- 1'-Chloronephroarctin (C_{20}H_{19}Cl0_{7}): Has a melting point of 181 °C (358 °F).

== Synthesis ==
The first total synthesis of nephroarctin was reported in 1976, driven by interest in nephroarctin and phenarctin's unusual structural features – particularly their large number of C_{1} substituents, with phenarctin being the only known fully substituted depside at the time. The key step involved the condensation of 3-methoxy-2,5,6-trimethylphenol (the A-component) with 3,5-diformyl-2,4-dihydroxy-6-methylbenzoic acid (the S-component) in the presence of trifluoroacetic anhydride.

The S-component was prepared from methyl haematommate through Gattermann formylation followed by treatment with boron tribromide. The A-component was obtained by catalytic reduction of rhizinonaldehyde. The final condensation reaction proceeded with a 23% yield to give synthetic nephroarctin that was identical to the natural product.
