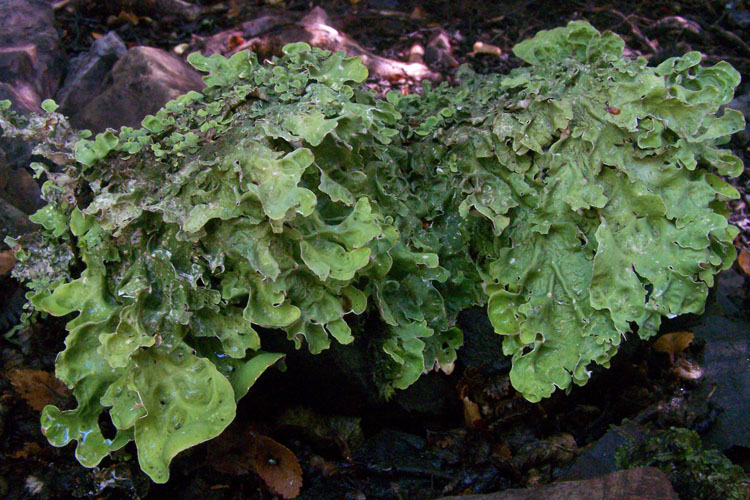

Scientific classification
- Kingdom: Fungi
- Division: Ascomycota
- Class: Lecanoromycetes
- Order: Peltigerales
- Family: Peltigeraceae
- Genus: Nephroma
- Species: N. australe

Binomial name
- Nephroma australe A.Rich. (1832)

Synonyms
- Lichen antarcticus Wulfen (1781); Nephroma antarcticum (Wulfen) Nyl. (1860); Opisteria antarctica (Wulfen) Vain. (1909); Opisteria australis (A.Rich.) Vain. (1909); Peltigera australis (A.Rich.) Mont. (1835)

= Nephroma australe =

Species of lichen

Nephroma australe is a species of foliose lichen in the family Peltigeraceae. It was formally described as a new species in 1832 by French botanist Achille Richard. It is found in cool temperate rainforests of Australasia and southern South America and has a wide distribution in New Zealand, including Stewart and Chatham Islands. It is commonly found in Nothofagus forests, particularly on N. solandri var. cliffortioides and N. menziesii, especially in the South Island.
