= Methodus qua omnes detectos lichenes =

Latin-language taxonomic monograph on lichens (1803)

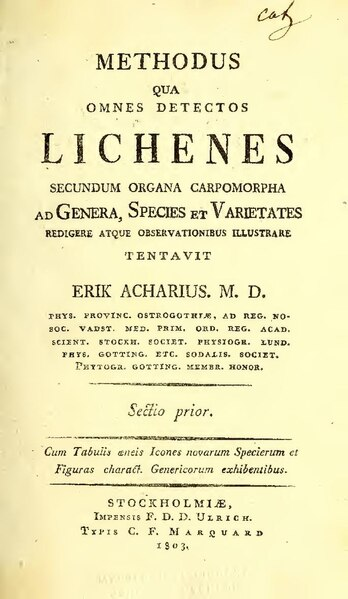
Title page

Methodus qua omnes detectos lichenes (Note: Full title: Methodus qua omnes detectos lichenes secundum organa carpomorpha ad genera, species et varietates redigere atque observationibus illustrare tentavit; 'A method for attempting to arrange all discovered lichens, according to their fruiting organs, into genera, species and varieties, and to illustrate them with observations'). Per Magnus Jørgensen renders the sense of the title as "Methods by which lichens can be securely identified by their fruiting bodies".) is an 1803 book on lichen classification by the Swedish naturalist Erik Acharius, with a supplementary volume issued shortly thereafter. The book revolutionized lichen classification by abandoning Carl Linnaeus's earlier approach, which grouped all lichens into a single genus called Lichen, and instead established 23 separate genera organized into orders. Acharius based these groupings primarily on the visible shape and position of apothecia (the spore-producing fruiting structures) rather than on features requiring a microscope.

Working in relative isolation in the Swedish town of Vadstena, Acharius built an extensive network of correspondents who sent him specimens from across the world, including material gathered during Archibald Menzies's voyages around the globe. The Methodus ultimately described 536 species. Political tensions between Britain and Sweden during the Napoleonic Wars delayed the book's distribution, but once it reached England, the botanists Dawson Turner and James Edward Smith promoted it enthusiastically, recognizing it as essential for organizing the rapidly growing knowledge of lichen diversity.

Although later scientists criticized Acharius's reliance on external physical features rather than internal or microscopic anatomy, the work established principles that remain fundamental to modern lichen classification. His annotated specimens continue to serve as important reference material for researchers working to understand lichen relationships.

== Publication ==
Methodus qua omnes detectos lichenes was published in Stockholm in 1803, with a supplementary volume (Supplementum) issued later from Leipzig. It was printed in Stockholm by C.F. Marquard for F.D.D. Ulrich and prepared under the supervision of Professor Schrader at Göttingen. By October 1802, about two-thirds of the manuscript had been sent to the publisher. Political difficulties between Britain and Sweden during this period hampered distribution, and copies were slow to reach British botanists.

As Acharius explained in the preface to the Supplementum, most of the main volume was already in print when he received a manuscript from Göran Wahlenberg describing numerous new northern species from the 1802 expedition, so he had this material issued a few months later as a separately paginated supplement, printing Wahlenberg's diagnoses almost verbatim and appending brief comments of his own. Because Acharius explicitly credited Wahlenberg with writing the formal descriptions, modern naming rules require these 27 species to be cited as 'Wahlenb. in Ach.' This includes ecologically important northern species like the "tar lichen" (Verrucaria maura, now Hydropunctaria maura). Irwin M. Brodo noted that the index to Methodus refers to the Supplementum but gives no page numbers, suggesting the index was prepared before the separately paginated supplement was set in type.

== Content ==
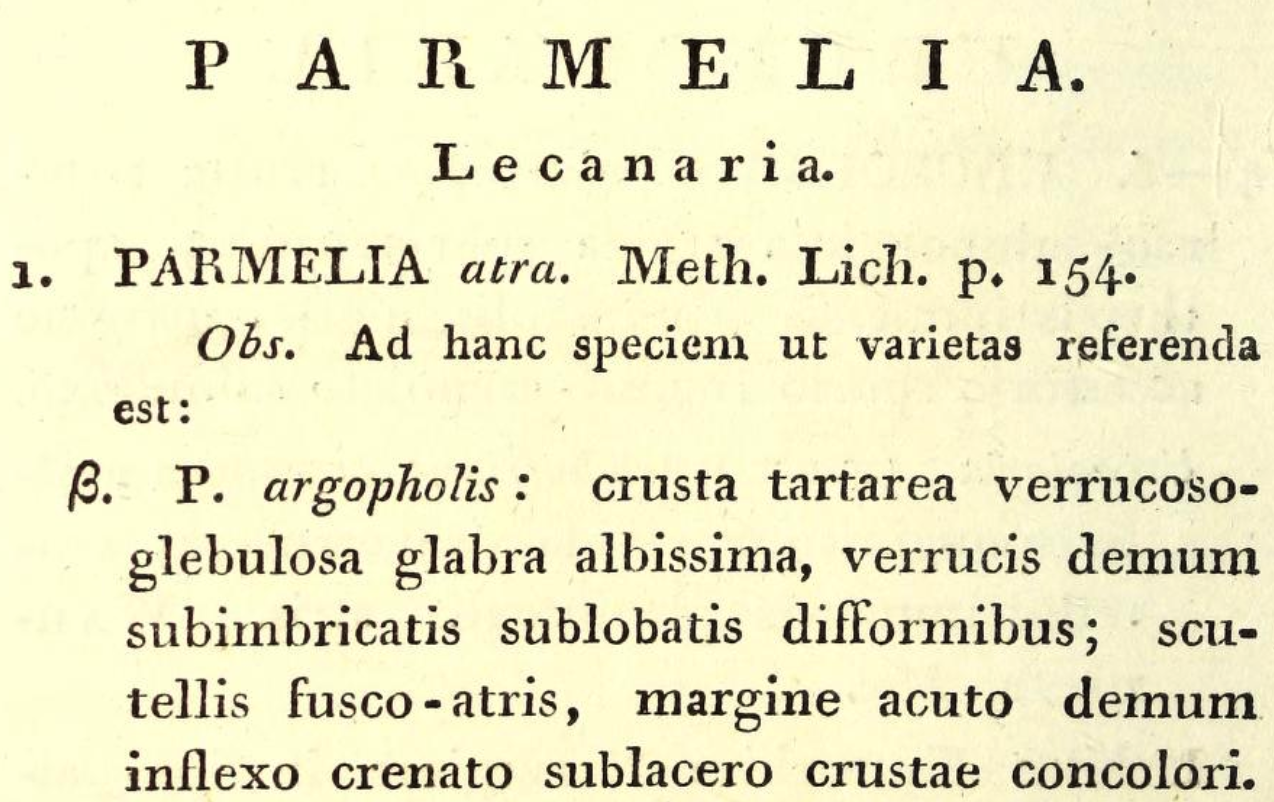
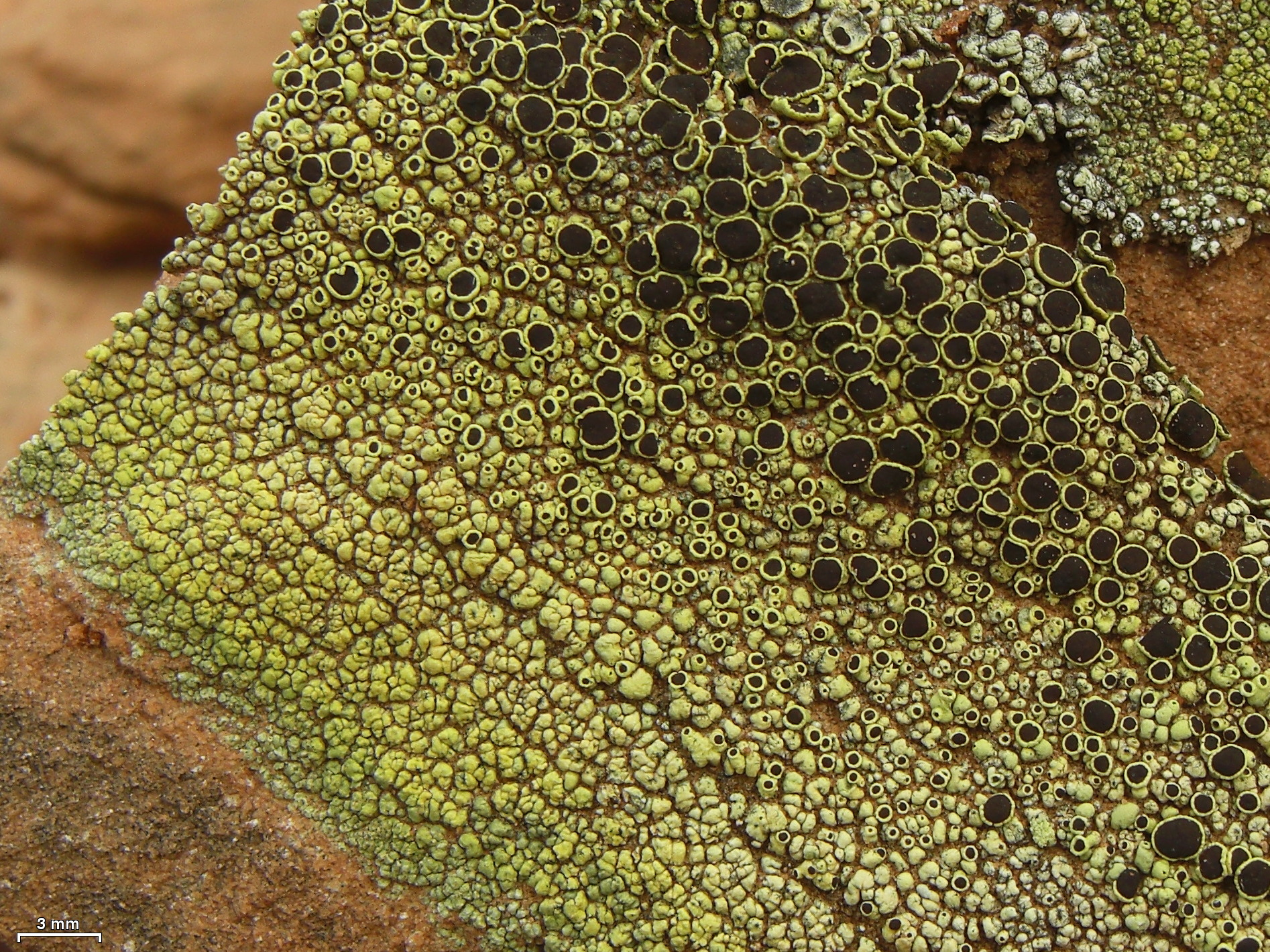
Sample entry showing Acharius's standard format: the Latin protologue of Parmelia atra β argopholis, now Lecanora argopholis. In the diagnosis he describes the apothecia as scutellis fusco-atris, margine acuto demum inflexo crenato, 'with dark brown-black apothecia, the margin sharp and later inrolled and crenate'—features visible in the photograph.

The Methodus introduced a new system for classifying lichens into distinct genera—a marked departure from Linnaeus's earlier approach, which had grouped all lichen species together under the single genus Lichen. In discussing this change, Acharius argued that distributing lichens into several genera was both necessary and useful, and that lichens should be treated as a large, diverse family or order of cryptogams (a historical term for organisms like mosses and ferns that reproduce via spores) rather than just a single genus. Acharius organized 536 species into 23 genera, which he grouped into orders. He defined each genus by the position and shape of the apothecia (the disc-like fruiting structures where spores are produced), while using the structure of the thallus (the main body of the lichen) only to tell closely related species apart. Like his later systematic works, he based these taxa almost entirely on macroscopic features visible without a microscope, such as overall thallus form and the shape and position of the apothecia. While this emphasis on visible, external features made the system practical for naturalists working in the field, it left internal anatomical details – such as the structure of reproductive cells – largely unexplored. The work incorporated specimens from diverse geographical sources, including collections from British botanists and material gathered during Archibald Menzies' circumnavigations of 1786–89 and 1791–95.

Acharius provided detailed descriptions of new species, including several collected by Menzies from New Year's Harbour on Staten Land, and from British Columbia. Among these were Hypogymnia enteromorpha, Menegazzia cincinnata, Hypogymnia duplicata, Leptogium menziesii, Nephroma cellulosum, and Pseudocyphellaria obvoluta. However, some locations were incorrectly recorded. For example, specimens from Staten Island (Isla de los Estados, near Tierra del Fuego) were mistakenly listed as coming from the Strait of Magellan (Ad Fretum Magellanicum in the original Latin), an error that has caused confusion for later researchers trying to determine exactly which specimens Acharius used when naming his species.

The taxonomic descriptions in the work were later expanded in Acharius's subsequent publication, Lichenographia universalis (1810).

== Development ==
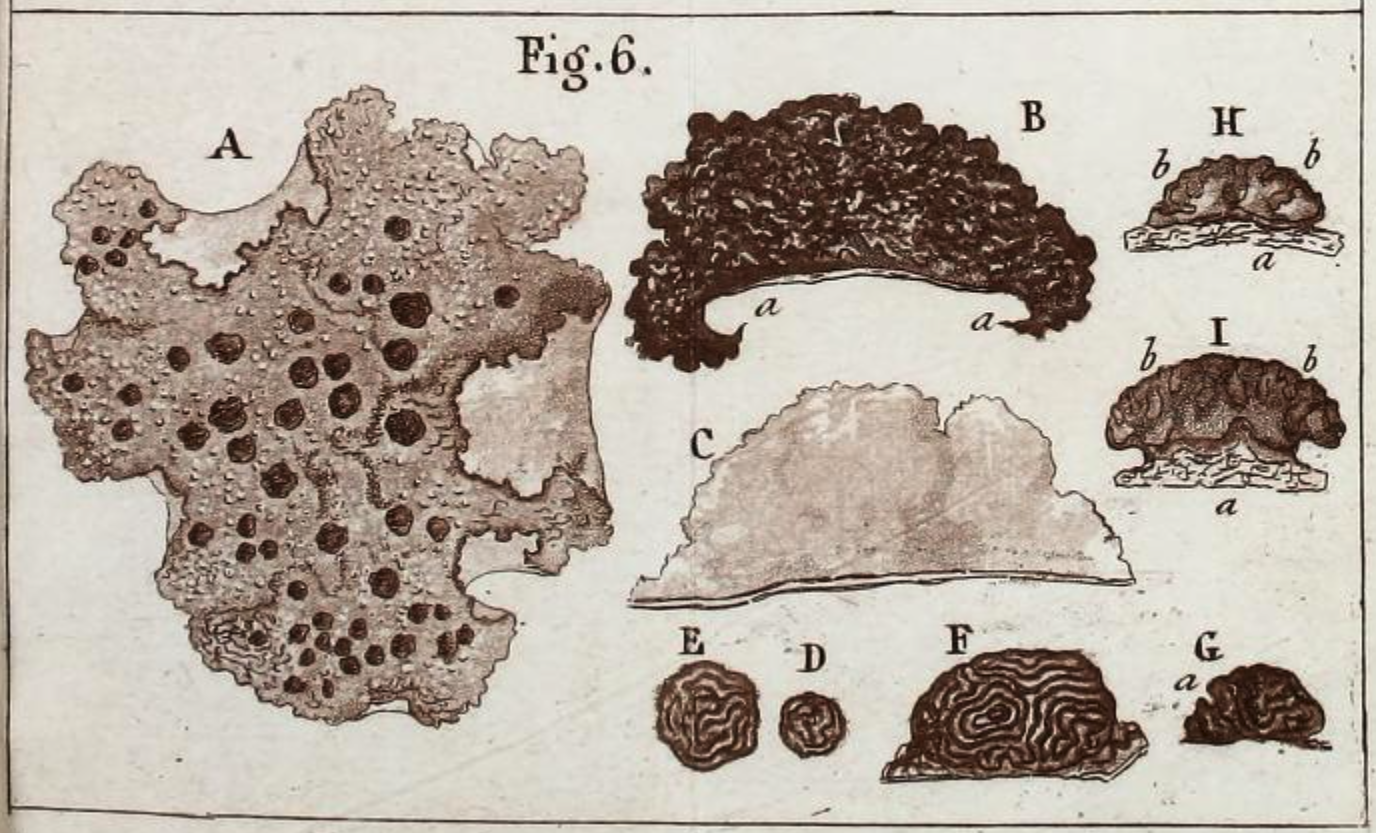
Figure 6 from a foldout plate (table II), showing thalli and apothecia of Gyrophora arctica (now Umbilicaria arctica) in surface and profile views, illustrating the fruiting-body characters he used to distinguish genera.

Acharius developed the Methodus while working in relative scientific isolation in the Swedish town of Vadstena (Östergötland). Owing to his remote location, he relied heavily on his colleague Olof Swartz in Stockholm for access to lichen specimens from foreign countries. Swartz, who had visited England in 1788, maintained connections with the prominent scientist Sir Joseph Banks, who owned an extensive private herbarium in London (often called the Banksian Herbarium), and with British botanists through his countryman Jonas Carlsson Dryander. Acharius's friendship with Swartz provided not only specimens but also a sustained forum for testing ideas. More than 300 surviving letters exchanged between 1792 and 1815 show Acharius repeatedly seeking Swartz's feedback on his classification concepts. In an August 1793 letter, he first explained to Swartz the central role he intended fruiting structures to play in defining genera, a principle he later elaborated in his published works.

The work's development benefited from an extensive network of correspondents, including the British botanists James Edward Smith, Dawson Turner, William Borrer, John Harriman, and Nathaniel Winch. These connections were particularly important for obtaining specimens, with Smith and Turner regularly sending British lichens to Acharius through Swartz. Smith also sent Acharius manuscript descriptions of new lichen species, including some based on collections made by Archibald Menzies during the Prince of Wales voyage (1786–89), and Acharius incorporated several of these descriptions into the Methodus with little alteration. The manuscript development took several years, with Swartz reporting in September 1802 that Acharius was "working on a general synopsis of the Lichens which will be good".

The work was also shaped by specimens collected during scientific expeditions, particularly those gathered by Archibald Menzies during his two circumnavigations. These specimens helped broaden the geographical scope of Acharius's taxonomic understanding.

== Reception and influence ==
The Methodus was first championed in England by Turner and Smith, who were instrumental in introducing Acharius's new taxonomic system to British lichenology. In a lengthy 1804 review in the Annals of Botany, Turner presented the book as the natural successor to Acharius's earlier Lichenographiæ Suecicæ Prodromus (1798). He argued that the rapid increase in known lichen species since Linnaeus's time made it unavoidable to subdivide the old catch-all genus Lichen. He explained to English readers how Acharius now defined genera by the form, texture, and attachment of the apothecia, segregated doubtful species, named major varieties, and used engraved plates and a glossary of new terms to make the system workable, remarking that such a generic treatment of lichens had "never before … been treated of by any English writer". Turner praised the Methodus as "the most excellent work we ever read upon the Lichens", though he was unsure about some of Acharius's very specific categories for crustose lichens (those that form thin crusts on rocks or bark) and the genus Parmelia and warning that changing so many established names and inventing new technical terms based on Greek words might make the scientific naming system too confusing.

Despite corresponding with Acharius and supplying specimens for study, Smith did not adopt Acharius's lichen classification in his own publications, continuing to treat lichens under the traditional collective genus Lichen. Smith's initial response was more cautious. While acknowledging the work's importance, he was reluctant to abandon established naming conventions, writing that he "must keep in view those Laws of Linnaeus which are sanctioned by experience and founded in justice". Despite these concerns, he actively corresponded with Acharius and contributed specimens for study.

Acharius's system circulated in Spain within a few years of publication, with Spanish botanists such as Mariano Lagasca and Simón de Roxas Clemente y Rubio working with the Methodus by the early 1800s, and Acharius receiving Iberian lichen material from Spanish collectors before 1807. However, Clemente noted that while Acharius's macroscopic system was foundational, it left many anatomical questions and generic limits unresolved, requiring further work to understand structures within apothecia and thalli and their variation with environment.

The work's influence spread through a network of correspondence between Swedish and British botanists. Its impact on English lichenology was considerable, influencing subsequent generations of botanists including William Borrer, who carefully examined Acharius's specimens after their arrival at the Linnean Society of London. The taxonomic concepts introduced in the Methodus continue to have relevance for contemporary studies in lichen taxonomy.

Selected lichen species first described in Methodus

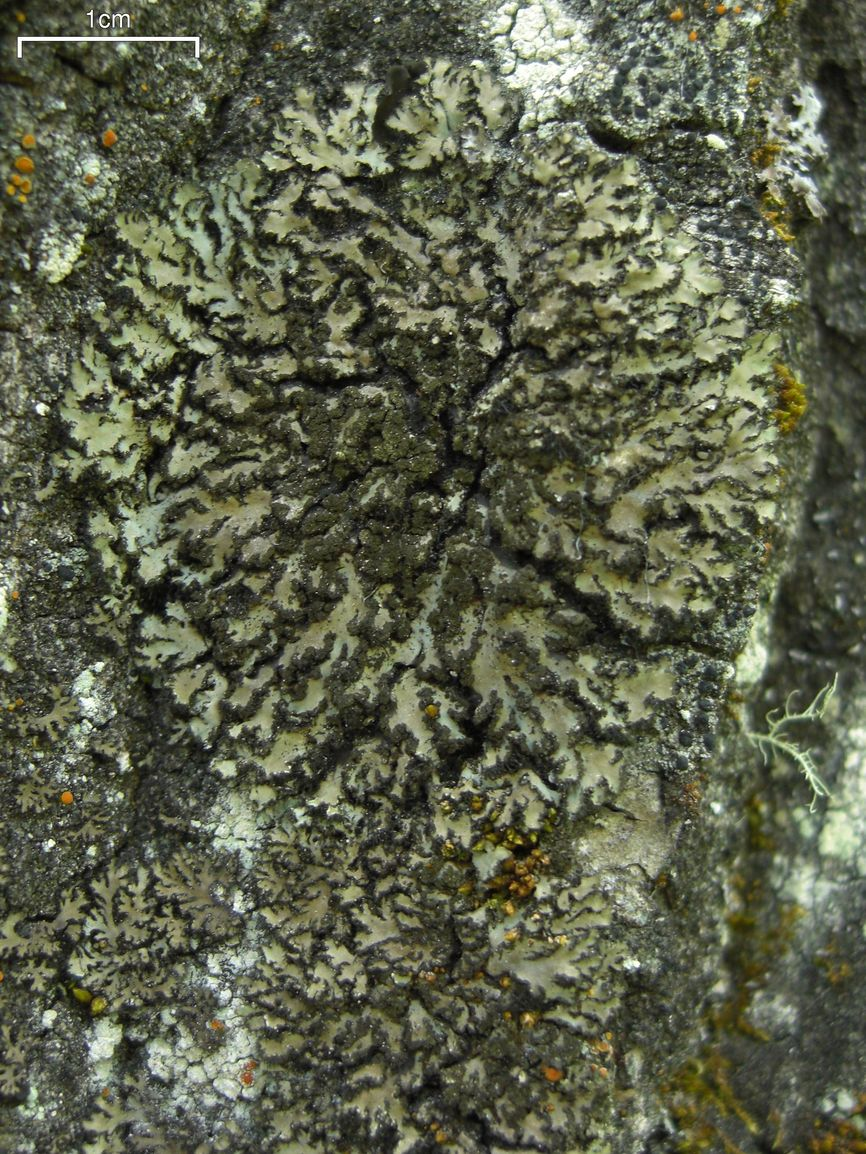
Phaeophyscia sciastra
(originally Parmelia sciastra)

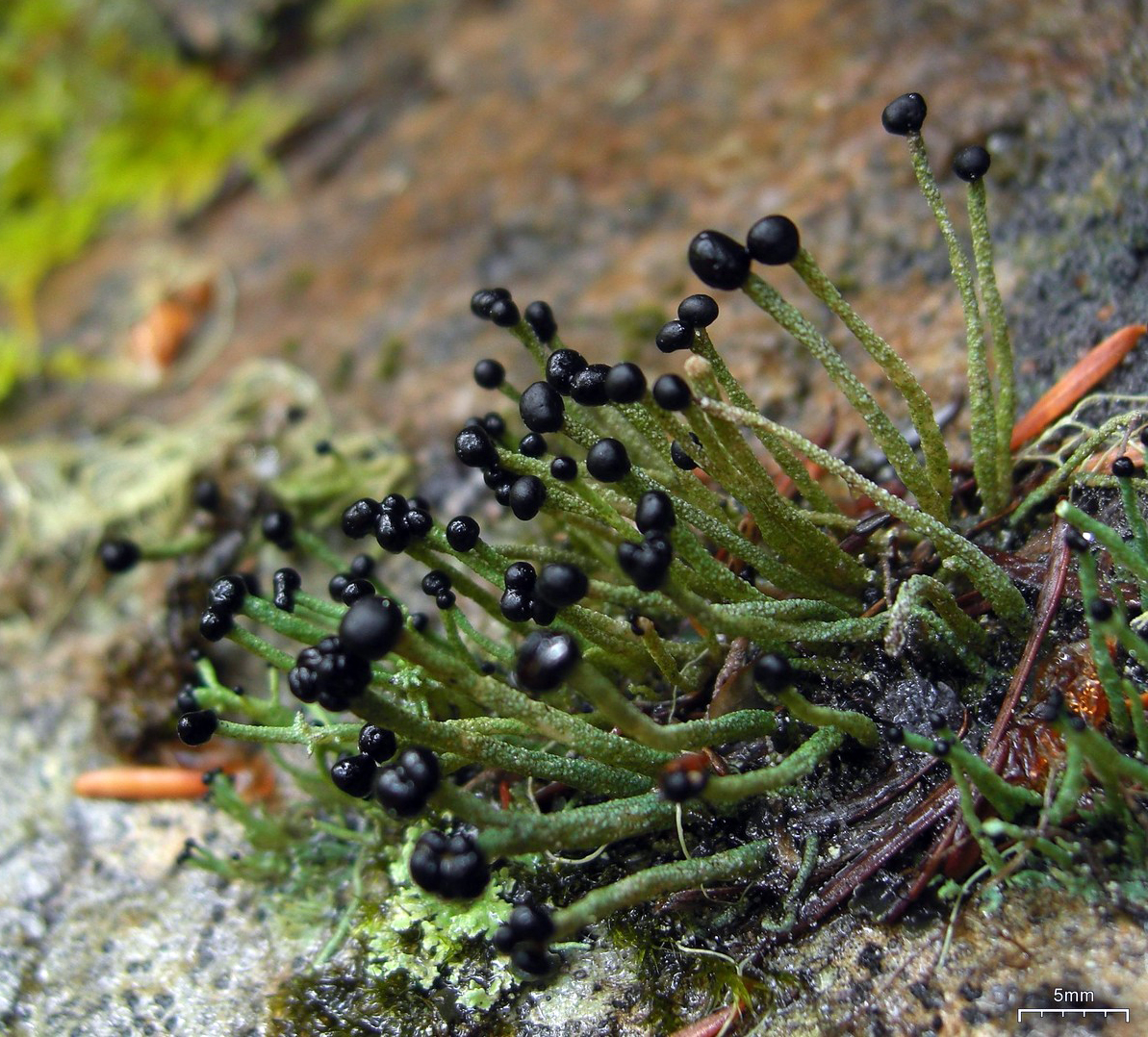
Pilophorus acicularis (Baeomyces acicularis)

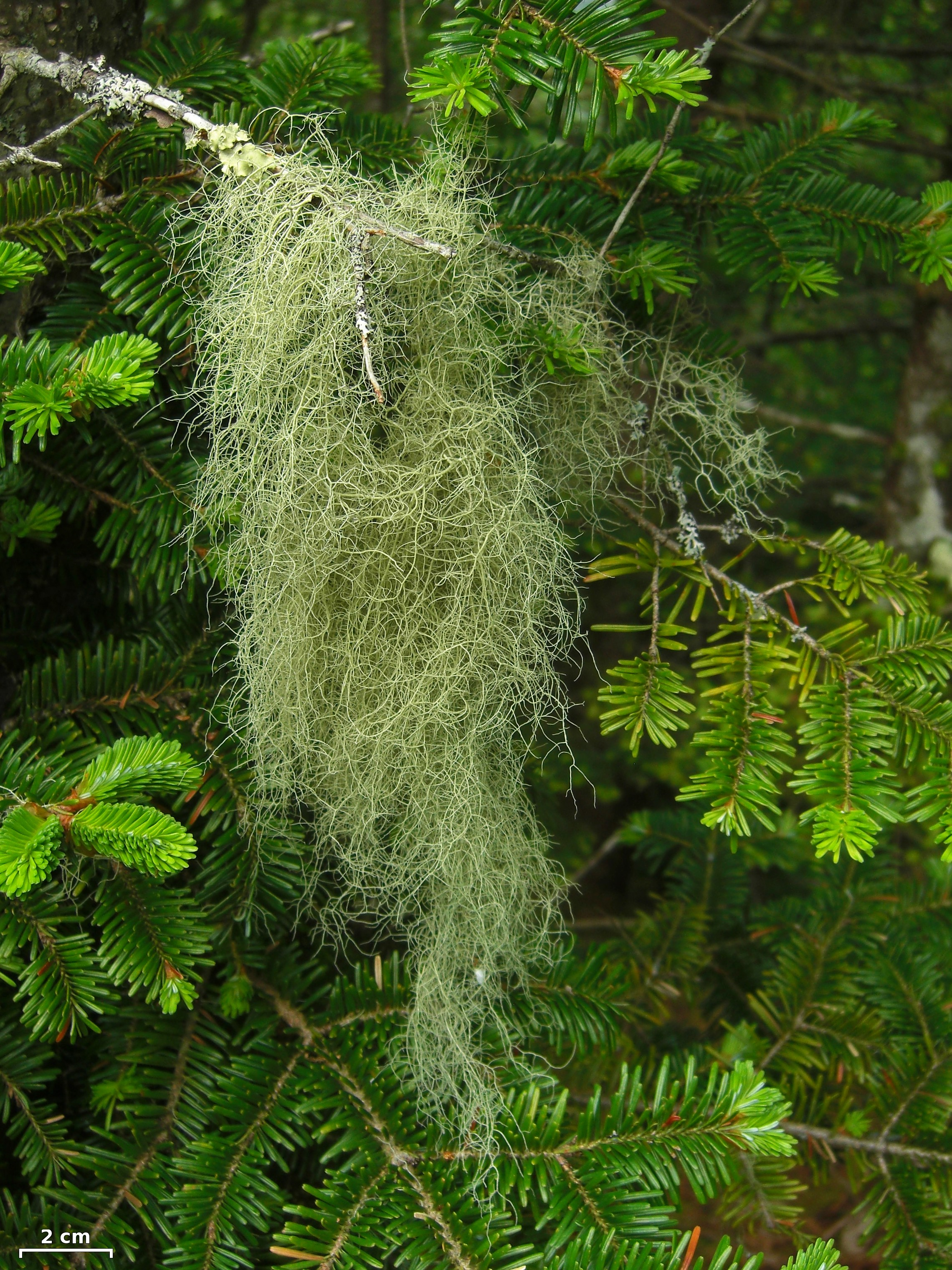
Usnea trichodea

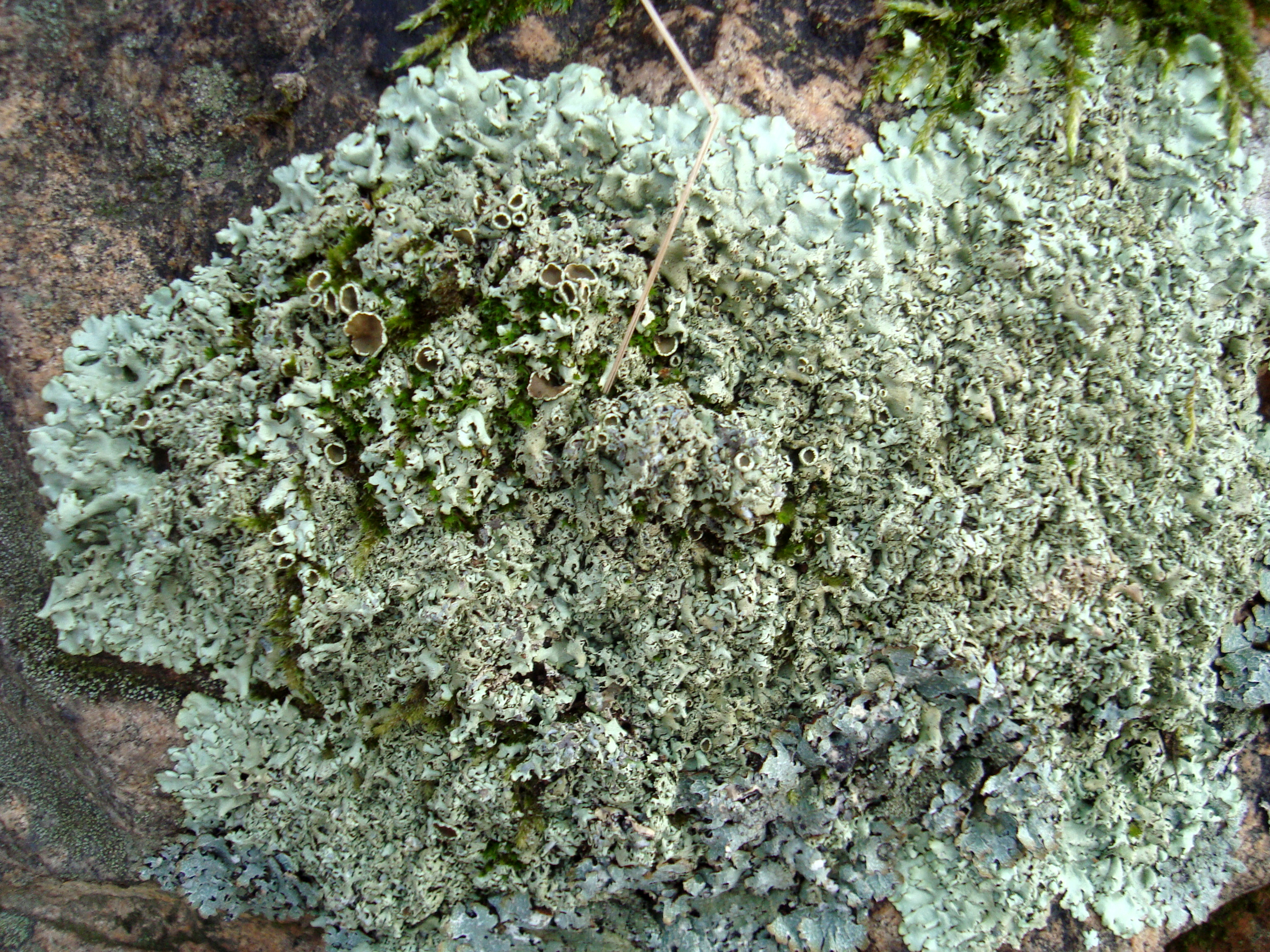
Xanthoparmelia stenophylla (Parmelia conspersa var. stenophylla)

== Legacy ==
The Methodus laid the groundwork for modern lichen classification by demonstrating that lichens could be organized into multiple distinct genera rather than treated as a single undifferentiated group. The specimens Acharius examined and annotated while preparing the work remain fundamentally important for contemporary taxonomic revisions. These specimens, now housed in the Natural History Museum, London, were purchased from the Linnean Society of London in 1963 and continue to serve as important reference material for researchers. The Natural History Museum's BM-ACH set derives from material Acharius donated to the Linnean Society of London in 1807 (apparently not received before 1809); it remained largely neglected until 1961, which helped preserve many specimens, but most labels lack locality and collector information.

The collection consists of 894 specimens arranged across 41 genera, representing Acharius's taxonomic arrangement as used in his later work Lichenographia universalis. Each specimen is attached to watermarked paper glued onto small cards (roughly 11–12 × 7–8 cm), which are mounted on standard herbarium sheets and stored in folders that preserve Acharius's original cataloguing order. This material is particularly valuable because it demonstrates the evolution of Acharius's taxonomic concepts, with specimen labels showing revisions from the Methodus system to that of his later publications. A limitation of this historic collection is the absence of collector and locality information for the specimens.

Later nineteenth-century taxonomists, such as Abramo Bartolommeo Massalongo, criticized Acharius's reliance on the external shape and position of fruiting structures. They shifted attention instead towards microscopic features, particularly the characteristics of ascospores (the spores produced inside the apothecia), yet modern authors still treat the Methodus, together with Lichenographia universalis and Synopsis methodica lichenum, as one of the principal early cornerstones of lichenology because it abandoned Linnaeus's single genus Lichen in favour of a more natural suite of generic entities. The book remains a cornerstone of science because it proved that lichens were a complex, diverse group of organisms that required their own specialized system of classification.

== See also ==
- Category:Lichens described in 1803
- Category:Taxa named by Erik Acharius
