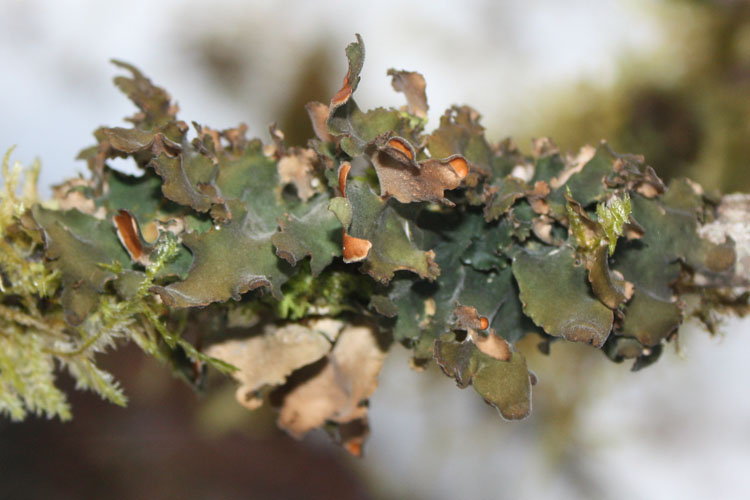

Conservation status
- Secure (NatureServe)

Scientific classification
- Kingdom: Fungi
- Division: Ascomycota
- Class: Lecanoromycetes
- Order: Peltigerales
- Family: Peltigeraceae
- Genus: Nephroma
- Species: N. resupinatum

Binomial name
- Nephroma resupinatum (L.) Ach. (1810)

Synonyms
- Lichen resupinatus L. (1753)

= Nephroma resupinatum =

Species of lichen-forming fungus

Nephroma resupinatum, commonly known as the pimpled kidney lichen, is a species of foliose lichen in the family Peltigeraceae. It was first described by Carl Linnaeus in his 1753 work Species Plantarum as Lichen resupinatus. Erik Acharius transferred it to the genus Nephroma in 1810.

The lichen has a brown to greyish-brown thallus that is tomentose, especially at the tips of the lobes. The lobes, which measure 5–10 mm wide, are covered with lobules, particularly along the margins and the cracks in the thallus surface, as well as pimple-like bumps (sometimes clumped together) visible through the tomentum. It grows on moss-covered rocks and on trees, usually in humid forests.

== See also ==
- List of lichens named by Carl Linnaeus
