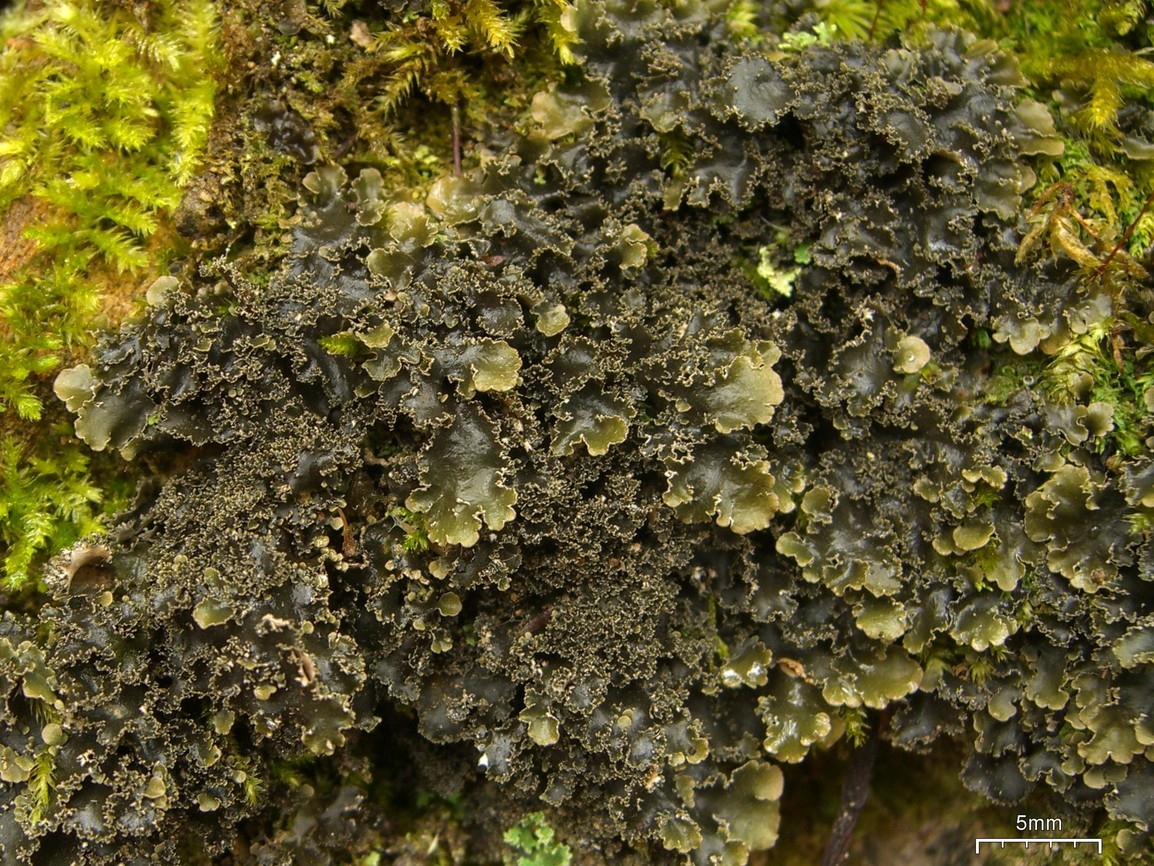

Conservation status
- Secure (NatureServe)

Scientific classification
- Kingdom: Fungi
- Division: Ascomycota
- Class: Lecanoromycetes
- Order: Peltigerales
- Family: Peltigeraceae
- Genus: Nephroma
- Species: N. helveticum

Binomial name
- Nephroma helveticum Ach. (1810)

Synonyms
- List: Lichen scutatus * helvetica (Ach.) Lam. (1813); Peltigera helvetica (Ach.) Spreng. (1827); Peltigera resupinata var. helvetica (Ach.) Fr. (1831); Peltigera resupinata f. helvetica (Ach.) Fr. (1831); Nephromium tomentosum var. helveticum (Ach.) Nyl. (1858); Nephroma papyraceum f. helveticum (Ach.) Th.Fr. (1860); Nephroma papyraceum var. helveticum (Ach.) Th.Fr. (1861); Nephroma tomentosum var. helveticum (Ach.) Anzi (1866); Nephromium tomentosum subsp. helveticum (Ach.) Nyl. (1876); Nephromium tomentosum f. helveticum (Ach.) Vain. (1881); Nephroma laevigatum f. helveticum (Ach.) Hazsl. (1884); Nephromium resupinatum d helveticum (Ach.) Arnold (1884); Nephromium helveticum (Ach.) Nyl. (1888); Nephromium resupinatum f. helveticum (Ach.) Dalla Torre & Sarnth. (1902); Nephroma resupinatum var. helveticum (Ach.) Gyeln. (1934); Ornatinephroma resupinatum var. helveticum (Ach.) Gyeln. (1934); Nephroma resupinatum f. helveticum Rabenh. (1845)

= Nephroma helveticum =

Species of lichen

Nephroma helveticum, the fringed kidney lichen, is a species of cyanolichen in the family Peltigeraceae. First described by Erik Acharius in 1810, it is part of a complex taxonomic group that includes N. tropicum. Modern molecular studies have shown that material previously identified as N. helveticum actually comprises two distinct species. The species occurs in moist, shady environments, particularly in old-growth forests. In North America, it is found at low elevations in riparian areas with coastal influence, while in Europe, where it is extremely rare, it occurs in montane-oceanic regions and shows a preference for basic rock substrates. In Nordic countries, it is known from approximately 20 localities across Finland, Norway and Sweden, where it is considered critically endangered.

== Taxonomy ==
Nephroma helveticum was first described by the Swedish lichenologist Erik Acharius in 1810. The species epithet alludes to its type locality, Switzerland. The species is part of a complex taxonomic group that includes N. tropicum, with which it has historically been confused. Modern molecular phylogenetics studies have shown that material previously identified as N. helveticum actually comprises two distinct species.

Early molecular phylogenetics studies in the early 2000s provided the first evidence that N. helveticum likely represented a complex of closely related taxa. Lohtander and colleagues (2002) found high genetic variability in both nuclear and mitochondrial DNA regions that corresponded with morphological and chemical variation, suggesting the presence of multiple distinct species within what was then considered N. helveticum sensu lato. Their work also established the placement of N. helveticum within one of four major clades in the genus Nephroma.

The application of the name N. helveticum remains somewhat uncertain, as the type specimen from Switzerland has never been found again in that country, leading some researchers to speculate that the original material may have been mislabelled. The lectotype specimen is held in the Acharius Herbarium (H-ACH 14703B), housed at the Botanical Museum of the Finnish Museum of Natural History.

Molecular analysis of ITS and mtSSU DNA regions has revealed two major clades within what was traditionally considered N. helveticum. One clade corresponds to N. helveticum sensu stricto (in the strict sense), while the other represents N. tropicum. The species can be distinguished by subtle morphological differences and chemical composition, though there is some overlap in characteristics.

Several other species names have been historically associated with this complex, including N. subhelveticum (now considered a synonym of N. helveticum) and N. sipeanum (now considered a synonym of N. tropicum). In total, about 20 different species names have been applied to members of this complex since its first description.

In Nordic countries, where the species complex has been extensively studied, N. helveticum sensu stricto is known from approximately 20 localities across Finland, Norway and Sweden, while N. tropicum is known from just a single Norwegian location. These are extremely rare species in the Nordic region, with both being classified as critically endangered (CR) in Norway. In Sweden, N. helveticum is listed as data deficient (DD), reflecting uncertainty about its conservation status.

In North America, the species is commonly known as the "fringed kidney lichen".

== Habitat and distribution ==
Nephroma helveticum is a species complex with a cosmopolitan distribution. It has a distinct habitat preference across its range. In North America, it typically occurs in moist, shady environments at low elevations, particularly in old-growth riparian forests and areas with strong coastal influence.

In Europe, where it is extremely rare, the species is characterised as montane-oceanic and is restricted to undisturbed, humid old-growth forests. The species demonstrates a strong preference for basic rock substrates in Scandinavia, though it can occasionally be found growing as an epiphyte on trees.
