= Gustav Torssell =

Swedish printer, publisher, and naturalist (1811–1849)

Gustav Torssell (born 28 April 1811 in Tynnelsö – died 5 February 1849 in Uppsala) was a Swedish printer, publisher, and naturalist who worked in Uppsala and Falun. He made contributions to both lichenology and journalism during his relatively short life.

Torssell is known for his work on lichens, publishing Enumeratio Lichenum et Byssacerum Scandinaviae ("Enumeration of lichens and Byssaceae of Scandinavia") (1843), a systematic catalogue of Scandinavian lichens. In 1845, responding to the crop failure and resulting famine of 1844, he published Anvisning till nödbrödsämnen–om användandet af lafvar till föda ("Guide to famine bread ingredients–on using lichens as food"), a practical guide describing how to use four species of lichen for making bread. This publication included actual herbarium specimens to help readers identify the useful species: Cetraria islandica, Cladonia rangiferina, Cetraria nivalis, and Ramalina fraxinea.

In journalism, Torssell founded the newspaper Thorgny in Uppsala following the influential Nordic student meeting of 1843. The paper, published twice weekly on Mondays and Thursdays, was named after Torgny the Lawspeaker, a figure who experienced renewed popularity in 19th-century Scandinavian and liberal circles. Under Torssell's leadership, Thorgny became an important forum for discussing Scandinavist ideas and other contemporary issues. However, due to Torssell's declining health, the newspaper ceased publication in 1845, though it was effectively succeeded by a new publication called Upsala, founded the same year.
