= Johan Havaas =

Norwegian farmer and botanist

Johan Johnsen Havaas
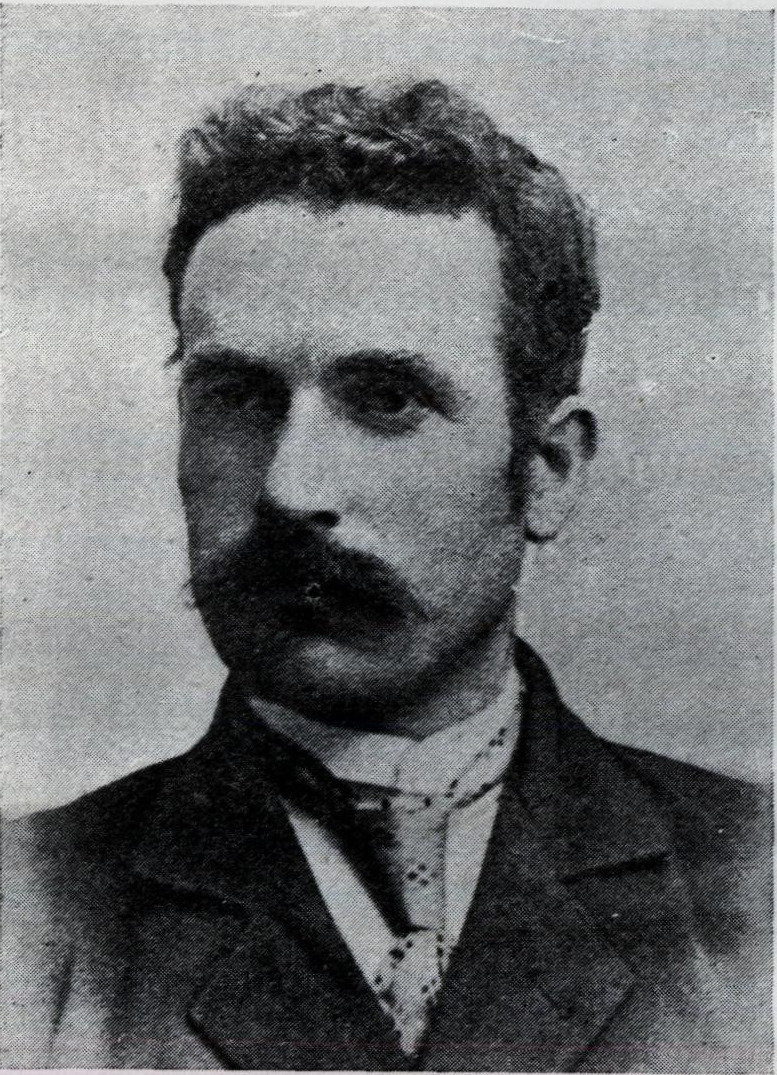
- Born: October 19, 1864; Ulvik Municipality, Norway
- Died: April 27, 1956 (aged 91); Voss Municipality, Norway
- Scientific career
- Fields: Botany
- Author abbrev. (botany): Hav.

Johan Johnsen Havaas (Havås) (19 October 1864–27 April 1956) was a farmer and botanist from Granvin Municipality (at that time it was called Ulvik Municipality) in Søndre Bergenhus county, Norway.

== Early life and career ==
Johan Havaas grew up on the farm Havås in Granvin Municipality and took an early interest in natural history and botany. He was particularly interested in the cryptogam flora. Havaas had only social studies and was largely self-taught, and also learned foreign languages (including Latin, English, German, French, Portuguese and Spanish) on his own, so he could both exchange letters with scientists abroad and publish his dissertations. With support from the Bergen Museum, among others, he traveled all over the country and collected and recorded large quantities of mosses, lichens and parasitic fungi. His interest was too low, and he himself described about 6 new species. For example, he found the first specimen of the lichen coastal coral lichen (Bunodophoron melanocarpum) in Norway, near Mosterhamn in Sunnhordaland in 1912. In 1911 he registered a find of bog herring (Saxifraga hypnoides) in Stadlandet, a moss that was first found in Norway in the early 1800s. Two lichens have been given a species epithet named after him. One is Flavoplaca havaasii, the other is Umbilicaria havaasii. His work aroused international interest, while he has been less well known in Norway. The Granvin Bygdatun Museum has a collection after Johan Havaas, otherwise there are collections after him at the University of Bergen and at Duke University in North Carolina in the USA. In 1934 he was honored with the King's Medal of Merit in gold. He continued to run his father's farm in Granvin even in his old age. He probably had the last kvanngarden in Granvin.

== Selected publications ==
- Floristiske undersøgelser i Søndre Bergenhus Amt (1897) (I Bergens museums aarbok 1897)
- Nye findsteder for nogle sjeldnere lichener (1899) (I Bergens museums aarbok 1899)
- Om vegetationen paa Hardangervidden (1902) (I Bergens museums aarbok 1902)
- Beiträge zur Kenntnis der west-norwegischen Flechtflora 1 (1909) (I Bergens museums aarbok 1909)
- Lichenvegetationen ved Mosterhavn (1916) (I Bergens museums aarbok 1917—1918)
- Om vegetasjonen på toppen av Hårteigen (1927) (I Bergens museums aarbok 1927)
- Om lichenvegetasjonen på Stadtlandet (1935) (I Bergens museums aarbok 1935)
- Notes to the lichen flora of the mountains Steinsæterhorgi and Smøreggfjellet in Granvin, Hordaland fylke (1954) (Årbok for *Universitetet i Bergen 1954)
- Granvins løvmosflora (1961) (Årbok for Universitetet i Bergen 1961)

Johan Havaas has also published two valuable exsiccata works:

- Lichenes exsiccati Norvegiae, a museo Bergensi editi
- Lichenes Norvegiae occidentalis exsiccati, a museo Bergensi editi
