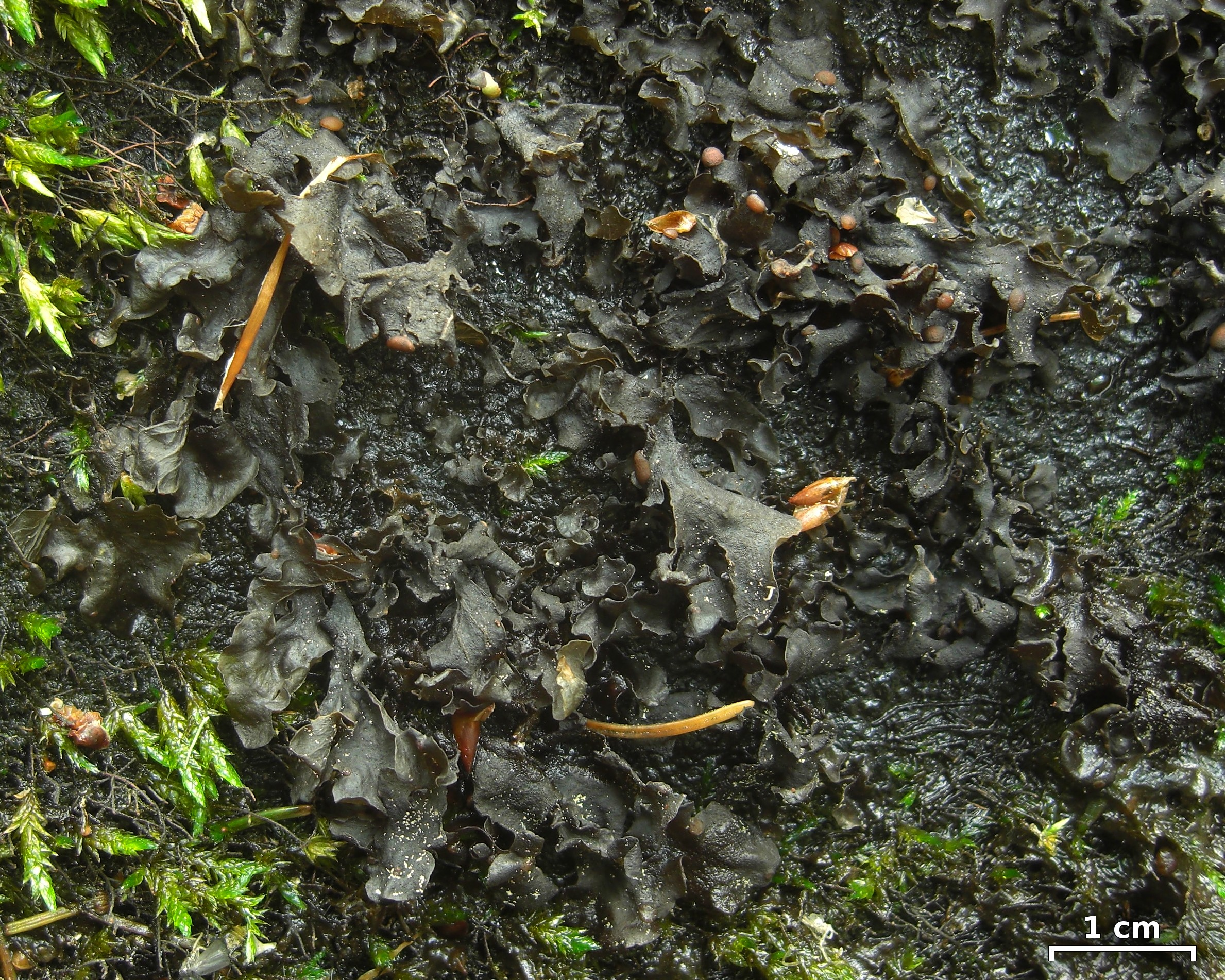
- var. hydrothyria
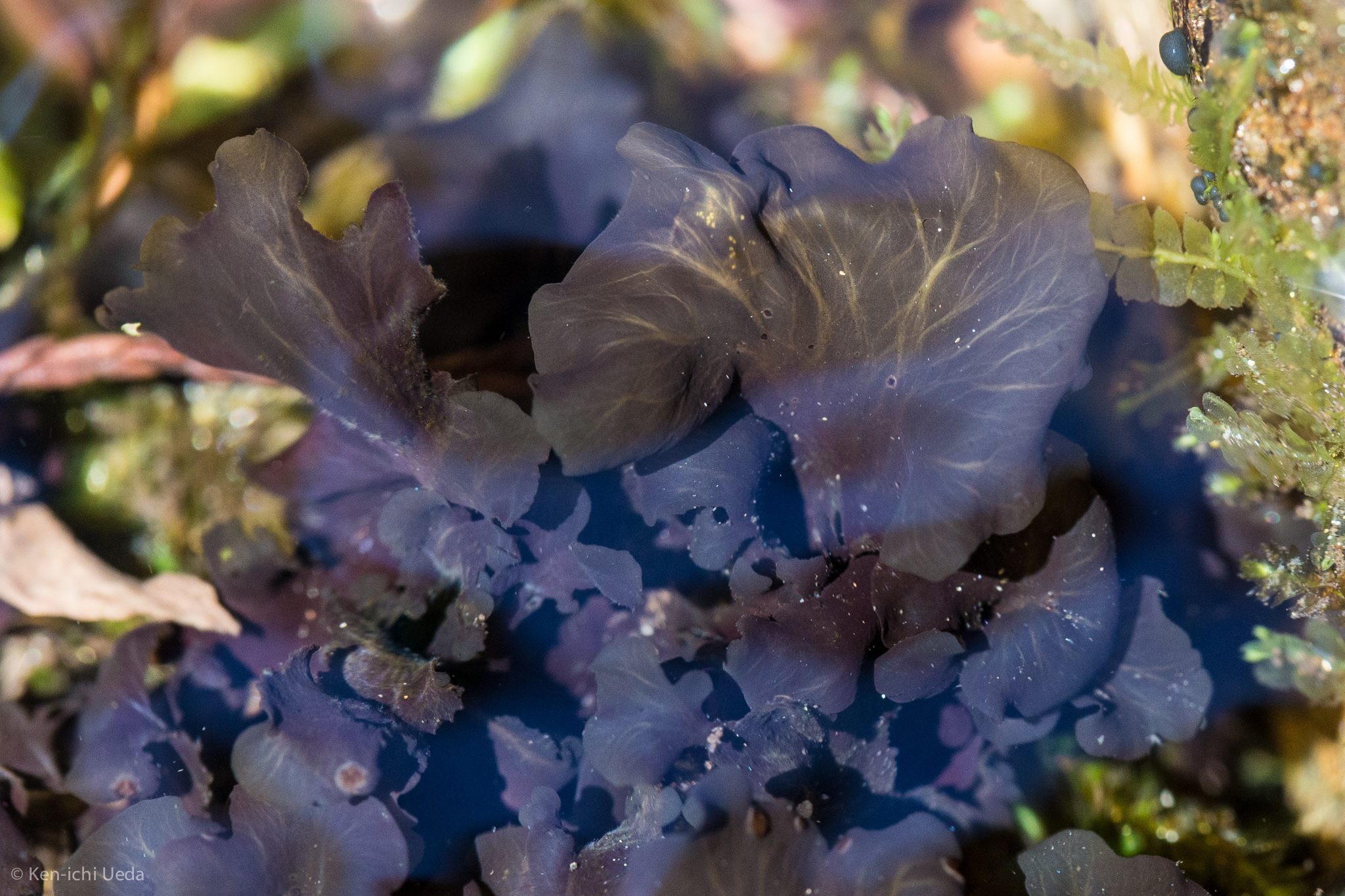
- var. gowardii

Conservation status
- Endangered (IUCN 3.1)

- Secure (NatureServe)

Scientific classification
- Kingdom: Fungi
- Division: Ascomycota
- Class: Lecanoromycetes
- Order: Peltigerales
- Family: Peltigeraceae
- Genus: Peltigera
- Species: P. hydrothyria

Binomial name
- Peltigera hydrothyria Miądl. & Lutzoni (2000)

Varieties
- P. hydrothyria var. aquatica (Miądl. & Lendemer) McCune (2022); P. hydrothyria var. gowardii (Lendemer & O'Brian) McCune (2022)

Synonyms
- Hydrothyria fontana Nyl. (1858); Hydrothyria venosa J.L.Russell (1856); Peltigera aquatica Miądl. & Lendemer (2014); Peltigera gowardii Lendemer & O'Brian (2011)

= Peltigera hydrothyria =

Species of lichen

Peltigera hydrothyria, commonly known as the waterfan, is a relatively rare aquatic lichen in the family Peltigeraceae, native to North America. It grows in cold, clean mountain streams, where it attaches to rocks and bedrock in shaded, riparian habitats. First described in 1856 as Hydrothyria venosa, it was initially placed in its own genus due to its distinctive gelatinous thallus and aquatic lifestyle. Molecular studies later demonstrated its affinity with the genus Peltigera, leading to its reclassification in 2000. The lichen forms small, blackish rosettes with ruffled margins and prominent veining, features that help it thrive in submerged or semi-aquatic habitats.

Three genetically distinct lineages are now recognized within the species, corresponding to eastern North America (var. hydrothyria) and western North America (vars. gowardii and aquatica). The eastern variety, var. hydrothyria, is listed as Endangered on the IUCN Red List due to significant population declines across its range, driven by habitat loss, pollution, and climate change. Western North American populations (vars. gowardii and aquatica) face similar threats, including logging, land development, and watershed disruption, although these varieties are generally less studied and monitored.

Peltigera hydrothyria plays an ecological role in nutrient-poor environments through its symbiotic relationship with cyanobacteria, which enables nitrogen fixation. Its distinct morphology and ecological preferences differentiate it from other aquatic lichens, such as Leptogium rivale. Ongoing research seeks to clarify the species’ population genetics, habitat requirements, and response to changing environmental conditions, providing critical insights for its conservation. This research has underscored the importance of preserving riparian habitats, not only for this species but also for maintaining broader biodiversity in freshwater ecosystems.

== Taxonomy ==
=== Historical taxonomy ===
Peltigera hydrothyria was originally described as Hydrothyria venosa by John Lewis Russell in 1856. Before its publication, Russell had circulated the species as Leptogium fontanum in Edward Tuckerman's 1854 Lichenes Americanae Septentrionalis Exsiccati (no. 150), but without a formal description, it remained a nomen nudum. Russell presented his findings at the Essex Institute in 1853, though they were not formally published until three years later. He first encountered the aquatic lichen in 1851 on Bald Mountain in Vermont while exploring with Charles Christopher Frost, remarking on its "grateful aroma" and distinctive morphology. Subsequent collections in Vermont and New Hampshire included one from Wantastiquet Mountain, which later served as the source of the lectotype. This specimen, distributed in the Reliquiae Tuckermanianae exsiccatae (no. 51), illustrated the defining features detailed in Russell's protologue.

Initially placed in its own genus Hydrothyria and assigned to the Collemataceae due to its gelatinous, unstratified thallus and aquatic habitat, the lichen was considered a rare, monotypic genus endemic to North America. Russell compared Hydrothyria to Collema and Leptogium, emphasizing the submarginal apothecia, thin membranous thallus, and fan-shaped (flabelliform) veining—traits he regarded as bridging algae and lichens. Despite sharing structural similarities with Peltigera (notably vein and rhizoid characteristics, as well as ascus morphology), he considered that the distinctive ecology and morphology initially justified a separate genus.

=== Molecular findings and genus reassignment ===
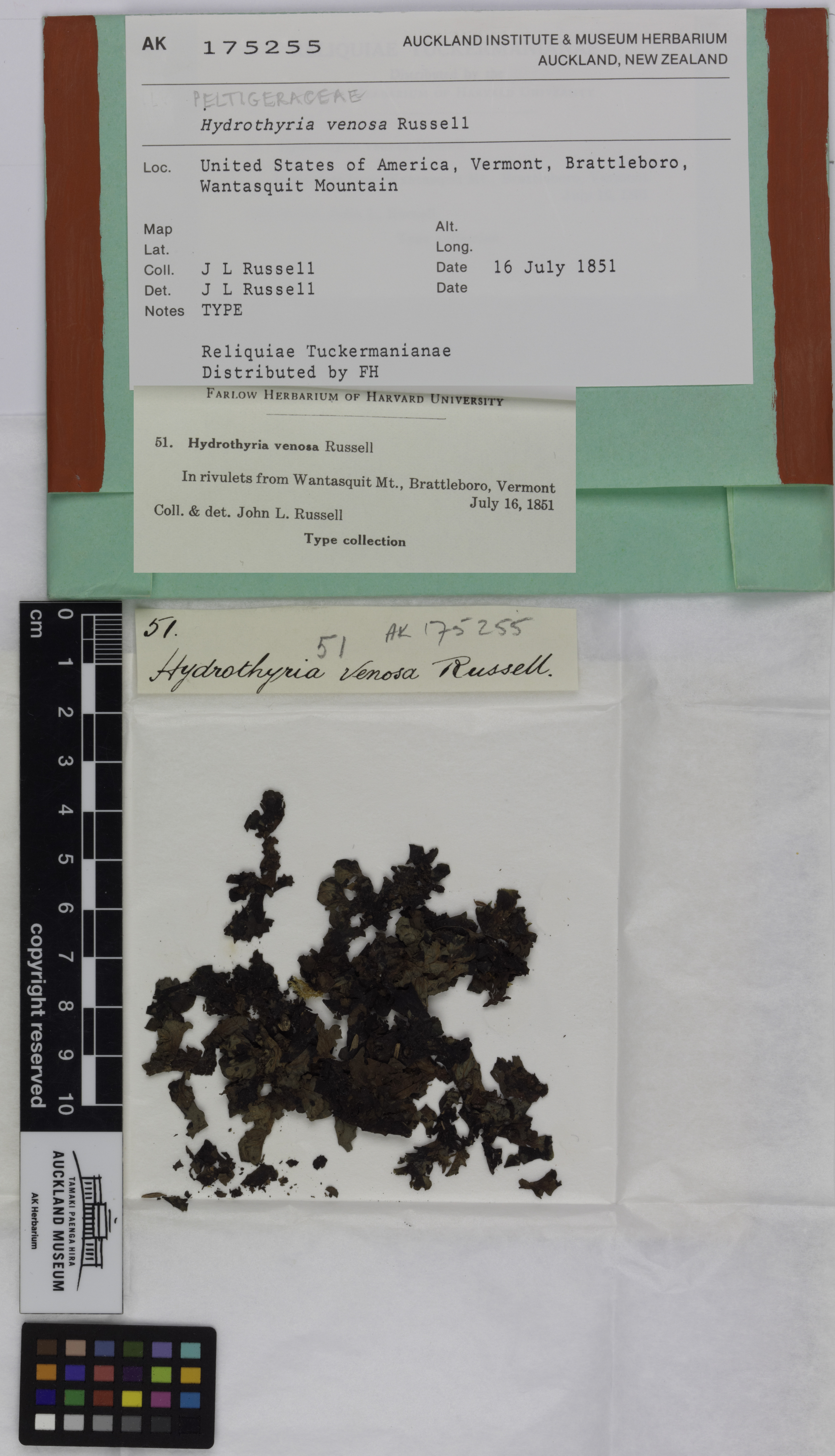
Type specimen (Reliqu. Tuckerman. no 51 sample in AK) of Hydrothyria venosa collected by John Lewis Russell in 1851 from Wantastiquet Mountain, Vermont.

Molecular phylogenetics analyses in the late 20th century revealed that Hydrothyria venosa was nested within the genus Peltigera, prompting its reclassification as P. hydrothyria in 2000. To accommodate this newly integrated aquatic lineage, a new section, Hydrothyriae, was established within Peltigera. Historically, P. hydrothyria was regarded as rare and associated with mature riparian ecosystems in the Pacific Northwest, but molecular data showed it formed a strongly supported monophyletic group alongside Solorina, clarifying its evolutionary position within the family.

=== Infraspecific diversity and varieties ===
Subsequent molecular studies using multiple genetic markers (ITS, β-tubulin, and EFT2-1) uncovered cryptic diversity within western populations. Researchers identified three monophyletic lineages: an eastern lineage (P. hydrothyria s.str.) retaining methylgyrophorate and methylecanorate, and two western lineages (P. gowardii s.s. and P. gowardii s.l.) lacking detectable secondary metabolites. The western epithet gowardii honors the Canadian lichenologist Trevor Goward, who collected the type specimen of P. gowardii in the Trophy Mountains of British Columbia.

Although initially recognized as separate species based on genetic, chemical, and geographic data, their morphological similarity proved challenging. By 2022, these lineages were reclassified as three varieties of P. hydrothyria: var. hydrothyria (eastern), var. gowardii, and var. aquatica (both western). This revision underscores the importance of integrating molecular, ecological, and chemical evidence to clarify species boundaries within cryptic lichen groups.

== Description ==
Peltigera hydrothyria is an aquatic foliose lichen forming small rosettes of variable size attached to the substrate by one to several holdfasts. The thallus is characterized by a gelatinous, nonstratified (homoiomerous) structure that is fully corticated. The thallus appears black when wet and slate gray when dry, with lobes 0.5–1 cm (3/16–3/8 in) wide. In dry conditions, it becomes thin, papery (about 100 μm thick), and ruffled. Submerged thalli appear translucent dark green or brown, aiding underwater light absorption.

The upper surface is smooth, dull, epruinose, and glabrous, while the lower surface has cylindrical veins of parallel, compact fungal hyphae that converge into a central rhizoid, anchoring the lichen to its substrate. The thallus of var. gowardii is typically dark gray when dry but takes on a purplish-brown, translucent appearance when fully submerged, giving it a texture and coloration reminiscent of seaweed. In the Pacific Northwest, western varieties (vars. gowardii and aquatica) grow as loose, ruffled clumps on submerged rocks, maximizing surface area for light capture and gas exchange in streams. In addition to rocks, occasional growth on submerged wood or aquatic plant stems, such as Darmera peltata, has also been documented. The lobes, typically medium-sized and up to 1 cm (3/8 in) wide, exhibit pronounced veining, a characteristic feature that aids in structural integrity under submerged conditions. The cortex is paraplectenchymatous, thin, hyaline, and approximately 8–10 μm thick. Under even closer microscopic examination, the internal cellular organisation reveals additional complexities. Young fungal cells contain a full complement of cellular components distributed throughout their volume, with the notable exception of specialized structures called dictyosomes. As these cells age, they develop an intricate network of internal membranes that eventually form into specialized compartments called vacuoles. These vacuoles, which are fluid-filled spaces within the cells, may serve multiple functions: helping maintain consistent internal conditions within the lichen, storing metabolic products, and potentially playing a role in secreting substances. The cell contents between these vacuoles appear to be held in place by limiting membranes, suggesting a highly organized internal structure that helps the lichen maintain its functions even in challenging aquatic environments.

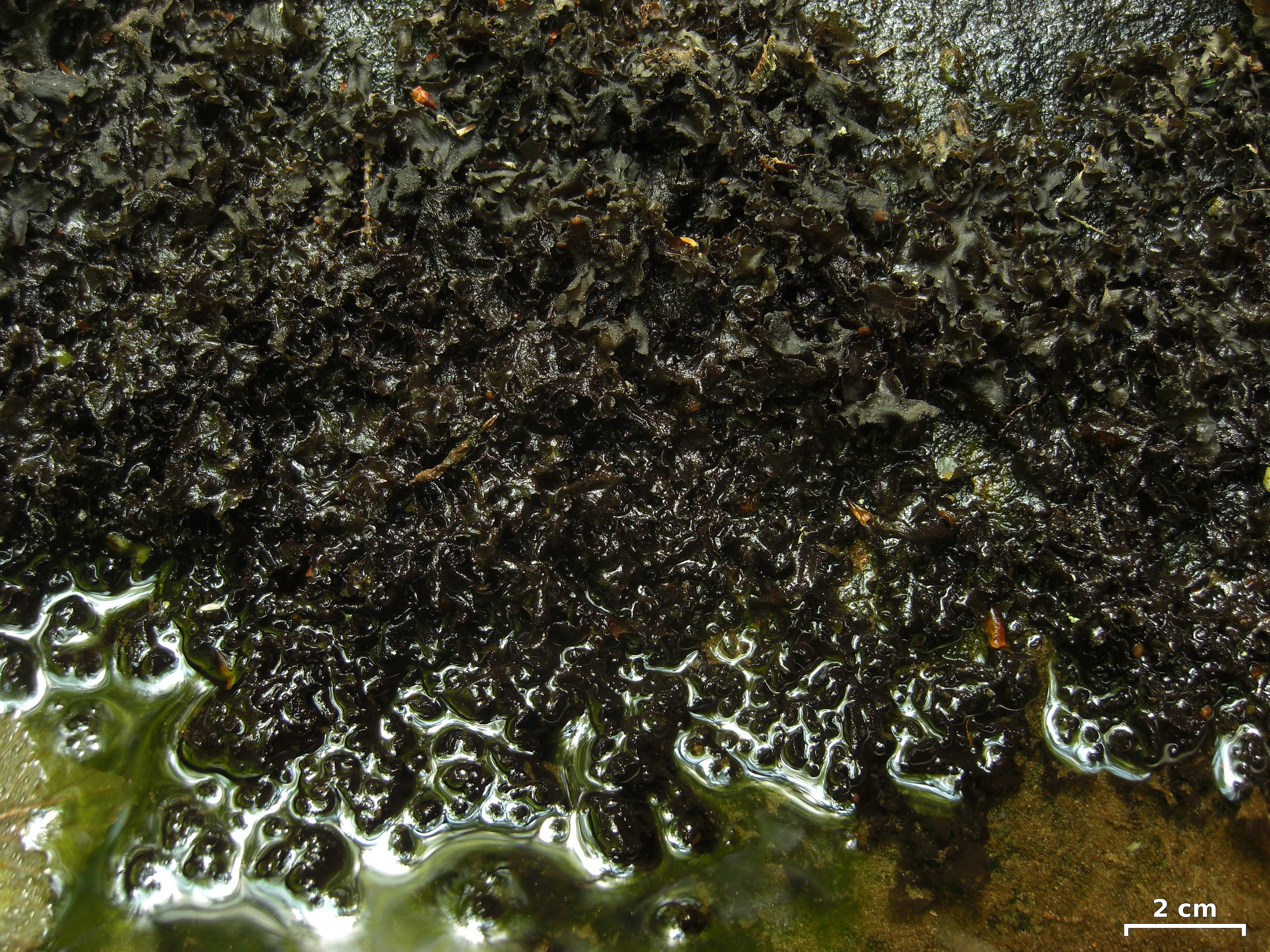
Growing on a submerged rock in a shaded stream in the Great Smoky Mountains, Tennessee. The gelatinous, black thallus is characteristic of its aquatic habitat.

Peltigera hydrothyria forms submarginal apothecia (fruiting bodies), setting it apart from most Peltigera species with marginal apothecia. These reddish-brown structures are plane to concave. The asci are 8-spored, producing unornamented, hyaline, 3-septate spores measuring 24–33 by 6.6–7.8 μm. In immature apothecia, the margins are slightly raised and often exhibit a reddish tint, becoming more convex and darkened with age.

Peltigera hydrothyria is a bimembered lichen, forming a symbiotic association between an ascomycete fungus and cyanobacteria (Nostoc) as the photobiont. This photobiont was identified to species in 1964 as Nostoc sphaericum. The thallus structure internally resembles that of the cyanomorph form of P. venosa, with which it shares several morphological features including the presence of a distinct rhizoid and veins with compact internal structure.

The vein structure resembles that of section Peltigera, with a compact central core of parallel, conglutinated hyphae. This anatomical feature represents one of the key characteristics linking it to the genus despite its unusual aquatic habitat and overall morphology.

The hyphae of Peltigera hydrothyria have a characteristic structural feature—multiperforate septa. Unlike the single-pore septa commonly observed in most ascomycetes, these multiperforate septa contain multiple pores, as confirmed by electron microscopy. The multiple pores likely improve nutrient and water transport, aiding the lichen's survival in its aquatic habitat by supporting efficient symbiotic exchange.

== Photobiont ==
Peltigera hydrothyria forms a symbiotic relationship with cyanobacteria from the genus Nostoc, which serves as its photobiont. Early studies identified the cyanobiont as Capsosira lowei. Molecular evidence, including 16S rRNA and ITS comparisons, later confirmed its placement within Nostoc, a genus widely associated with lichens and plants.

The photobiont shows distinct structural adaptations when lichenized. Compared to free-living forms, the Nostoc cells within P. hydrothyria develop more numerous photosynthetic structures called thylakoids, which arrange themselves in distinctive spiral whorls toward the cell center. This increased density and organized arrangement of photosynthetic machinery likely enhances the lichen's ability to capture light in its shaded aquatic habitat. The cell wall of the lichenized Nostoc maintains a characteristic four-layered structure similar to its free-living relatives, suggesting that certain fundamental features remain stable despite the symbiotic relationship.

Phylogenetic studies indicate that Nostoc strains in aquatic Peltigera species, including P. hydrothyria, form a distinct lineage. This lineage may also include cyanobacteria from other aquatic lichens, such as Leptogium rivulare, pending further sampling. Aquatic Nostoc strains show morphological plasticity, with pseudodichotomous filament branching in lichenized states but more variable forms in culture. This plasticity suggests that the photobiont is highly responsive to its symbiotic environment. Multipore septa in the fungal hyphae may further improve nutrient and water transport within the thallus, facilitating efficient exchange between partners in nutrient-poor environments. Though P. hydrothyria depends on its Nostoc symbiont, which appears specifically adapted to aquatic habitats, the extent of these adaptations remains under investigation. At Hen Wallow Falls in the Great Smoky Mountains, the lichen thrives in acidic splash zones with pH as low as 4.7, suggesting selective pressures that strengthen the partnership.

Nitrogen fixation by the photobiont allows P. hydrothyria to grow in nutrient-poor, shaded aquatic habitats. The cyanobiont produces hormogonia, specialized structures that enhance resilience and regeneration in fluctuating aquatic ecosystems.

== Chemistry ==
Peltigera hydrothyria shows chemical variation across its varieties. The eastern var. hydrothyria produces methylgyrophorate and methylecanorate with occasional traces of gyrophoric or lecanoric acid, though these compounds are present in variable concentrations both within and between thalli. These substances are often difficult to detect using standard spot tests and thin-layer chromatography techniques, sometimes requiring multiple analyses of the same specimen using different solvent systems. Early high-performance liquid chromatography studies confirmed the presence of these compounds in eastern populations while demonstrating their absence in western populations.

The western var. gowardii typically lacks detectable lichen substances when analyzed using standard chemical tests. Standard spot tests for both varieties are negative (K−, C−, KC−, P−, UV−), even in specimens where secondary metabolites are confirmed to be present through other analytical methods.

This chemical difference between the eastern and western populations was one of the key factors, along with molecular and biogeographic evidence, that led to the recognition of these taxa as distinct varieties.

== Similar species ==
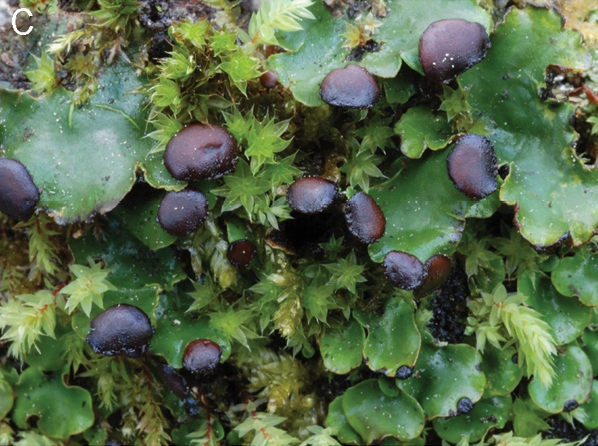
The terrestrial Peltigera venosa shares some morphological features with P. hydrothyria.

Peltigera hydrothyria and P. venosa share features such as a single rhizoid for attachment and compactly structured veins. However, P. hydrothyria is unique in its aquatic habitat, gelatinous thallus, and submarginal apothecia.

Another aquatic lichen, Leptogium rivale, occurs in the Cascades, Sierra Nevada, and Colorado mountain ranges, where it often overlaps in habitat with western North American populations of P. hydrothyria. Leptogium rivale thrives in larger watercourses, unlike P. hydrothyria, which prefers smaller streams. It forms small rosettes (up to 2 cm in diameter) with elongate lobes (0.2–1.5 mm wide) tightly attached to rocks. Leptogium rivale is more tolerant of fluctuating stream flow and water clarity than P. hydrothyria, which requires stable submersion in clean, oxygen-rich water. While both species inhabit shaded streams, L. rivale often grows in looser clumps at the edges of larger watercourses.

Other aquatic lichens, such as those in the genera Verrucaria, Hymenelia, and Dermatocarpon, differ from P. hydrothyria. Its foliose growth form, corticated surface, distinct venation, and symbiosis with cyanobacteria distinguish it from these crustose or squamulose species. Dermatocarpon luridum shares similar habitats but differs in its crustose to squamulose thallus. Its rigid, tightly adhered structure is suited to high water velocity, unlike the flexible, ruffled growth of P. hydrothyria.

Free-living Nostoc colonies may resemble P. hydrothyria but are greener, bumpier, and tougher than its gelatinous, translucent thallus.

== Habitat, distribution, and ecology ==
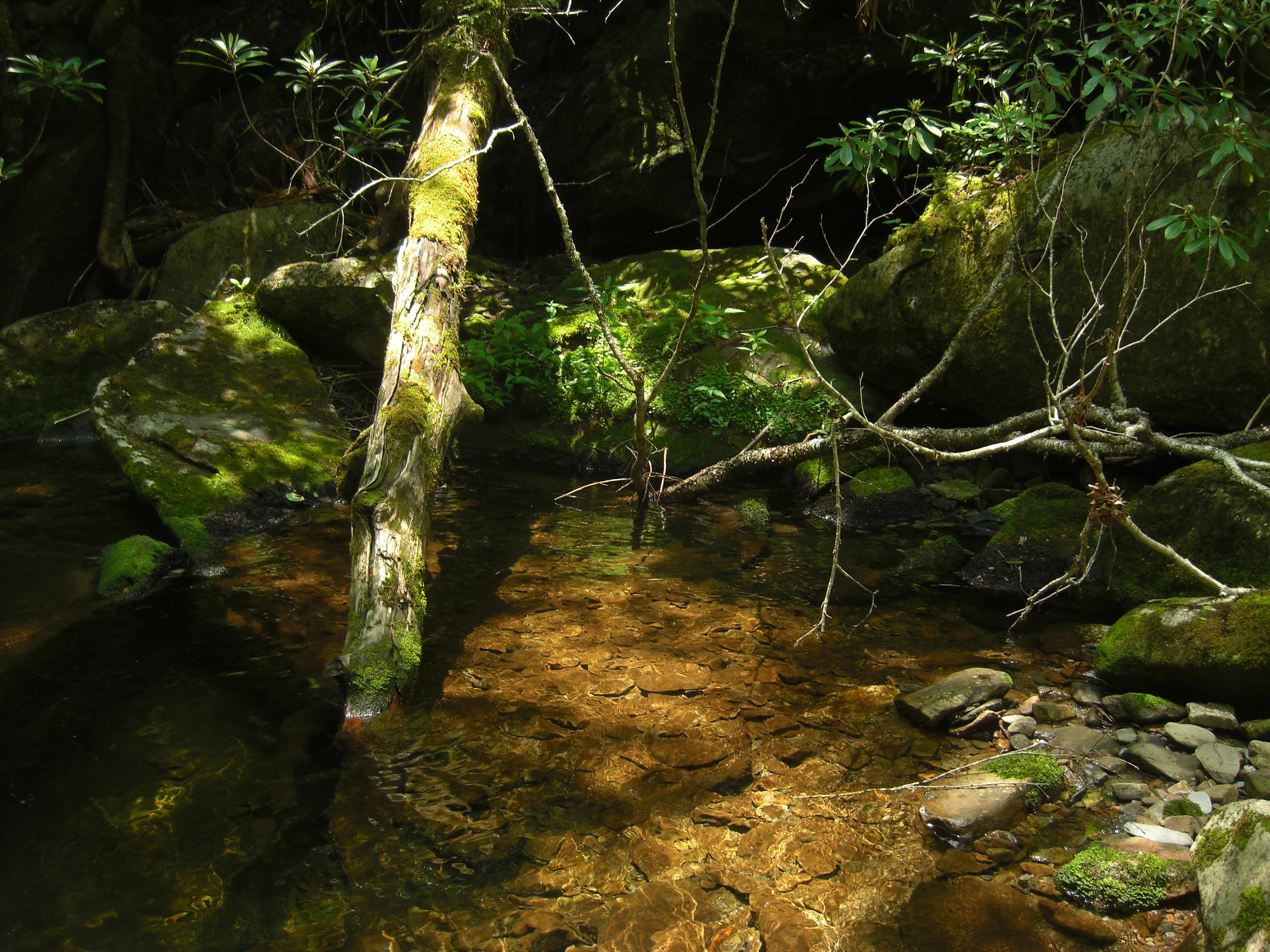
A typical habitat for the waterfan, with shade and slow-moving stream

=== Geographic distribution and varieties ===
Peltigera hydrothyria displays a distinct biogeographic pattern across North America. The nominate variety (var. hydrothyria) is endemic to the Appalachian Mountains in eastern North America, while var. gowardii ranges from northern California through the Pacific Northwest to southern Alaska, with isolated populations in Idaho. In the eastern United States, it has been recorded in Appalachian states and New England, though many historical records—particularly those near urbanized regions—are now considered extirpated.

In Canada, P. hydrothyria s.str. occurs in small numbers of forested streams in Quebec, New Brunswick, and Nova Scotia, where the climate is perhumid, with year-round wetness due to precipitation exceeding evaporation and transpiration. This climatic requirement explains its patchy distribution, as suitable conditions exist along the Appalachian chain and coastal eastern Canada but not in intervening areas. Canadian populations, confirmed by genetic analysis as P. hydrothyria s.str., inhabit elevations of 68–723 m (223–2,372 ft) under birch and balsam fir canopies. Population sizes vary widely, from as few as 12 to over 484 mature individuals at a single site. In 2022, the discovery of a previously undocumented population in the Kennedy Lakes Protected Natural Area, New Brunswick, suggested that additional suitable habitats may exist in the humid uplands of that region and adjacent Quebec.

=== General habitat preferences ===
Throughout its range, P. hydrothyria thrives in cold, clean, oxygen-rich mountain streams with stable flow, typically in shaded riparian habitats. It often grows directly on rocks or bedrock near waterfalls, where protective backwaters and bedrock ledges stabilize conditions, and is commonly positioned 0–2 cm (0–3/4 in) above water level. Although primarily found on rock substrates, occasional growth on submerged wood or aquatic plant stems (e.g., Darmera peltata) has been observed. In the Western United States, surveys have documented populations in the Cascade and Siskiyou mountain ranges of Oregon and northern California, as well as in the California Coast Ranges, where seasonal water-level fluctuations create varied microhabitats.

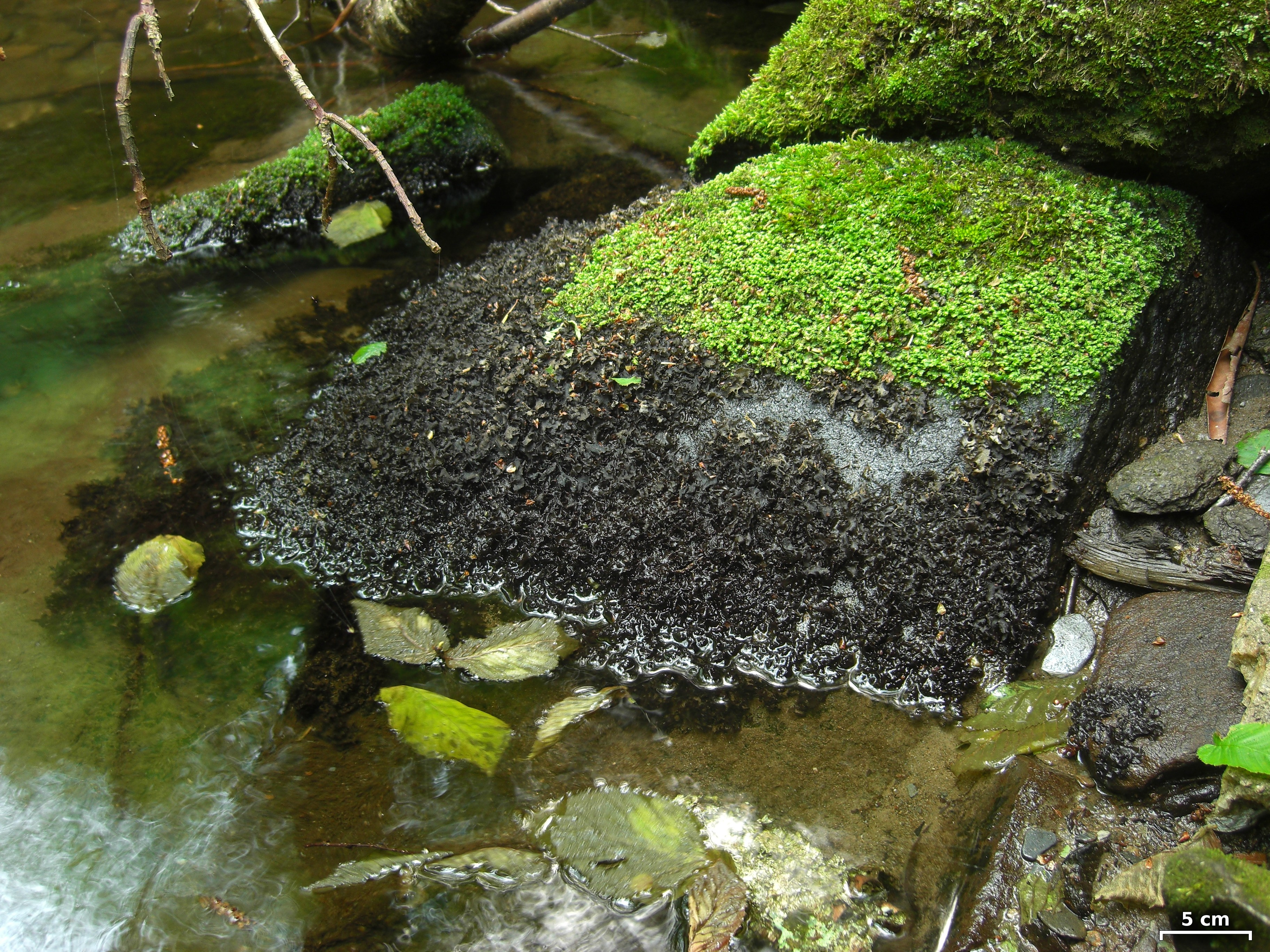
Growing on rock with parts of the thallus submerged in the stream, and moss growing on the top.

Within these microhabitats, P. hydrothyria can be fully submerged or present in moist spray zones. Spray-zone thalli often have smaller, more numerous lobes than submerged individuals, showing morphological plasticity in response to moisture gradients. The species appears particularly sensitive to water temperatures above 18 °C (64 °F), growing optimally between 10 and 15 °C (50 and 59 °F). Even slight increases in sedimentation or alterations to stream flow can destabilize populations, as it relies on pristine riparian ecosystems.

=== Environmental conditions and ecological interactions ===
Peltigera hydrothyria favors conditions with dissolved oxygen around 8.22 mg/L, nitrogen at 0.03 mg/L, and phosphorus at 0.013 mg/L, reflecting its need for clean, nutrient-poor environments. Low nitrate levels can enhance growth, but concentrations above 40 mmol damage the thallus and inhibit growth. Stream pH typically ranges from 6.0 to 7.0, and sinuous stream configurations that create protected pockets are preferred. Humidity is critical where thalli remain partially above water during low-flow periods; surrounding wet bryophytes help maintain moisture and prevent desiccation.

The species frequently co-occurs with other aquatic lichens, such as Leptogium rivale, although P. hydrothyria generally occupies smaller, shaded streams, whereas L. rivale tolerates larger watercourses. Morphologically, L.rivale forms smaller, tightly attached rosettes with elongate lobes, in contrast to the sub-erect thallus and pronounced venation of P. hydrothyria.

=== Regional and elevational variation ===
Habitat preferences vary slightly by region. In the Southern Appalachians, P. hydrothyria occurs in narrow, shaded streams with hardwood canopies dominated by beech and rhododendron. In the Oregon Cascades, it prefers semi-shaded streams, while farther north in British Columbia, it inhabits colder, more exposed streams at higher elevations. Northern California populations occur at elevations up to 3,900 m (12,800 ft), where snowmelt-fed streams maintain stable flows and minimal sedimentation, essential for sustaining suitable habitat. Additional populations have been identified on private lands, underscoring the importance of involving private landowners in conservation planning.

== Conservation ==
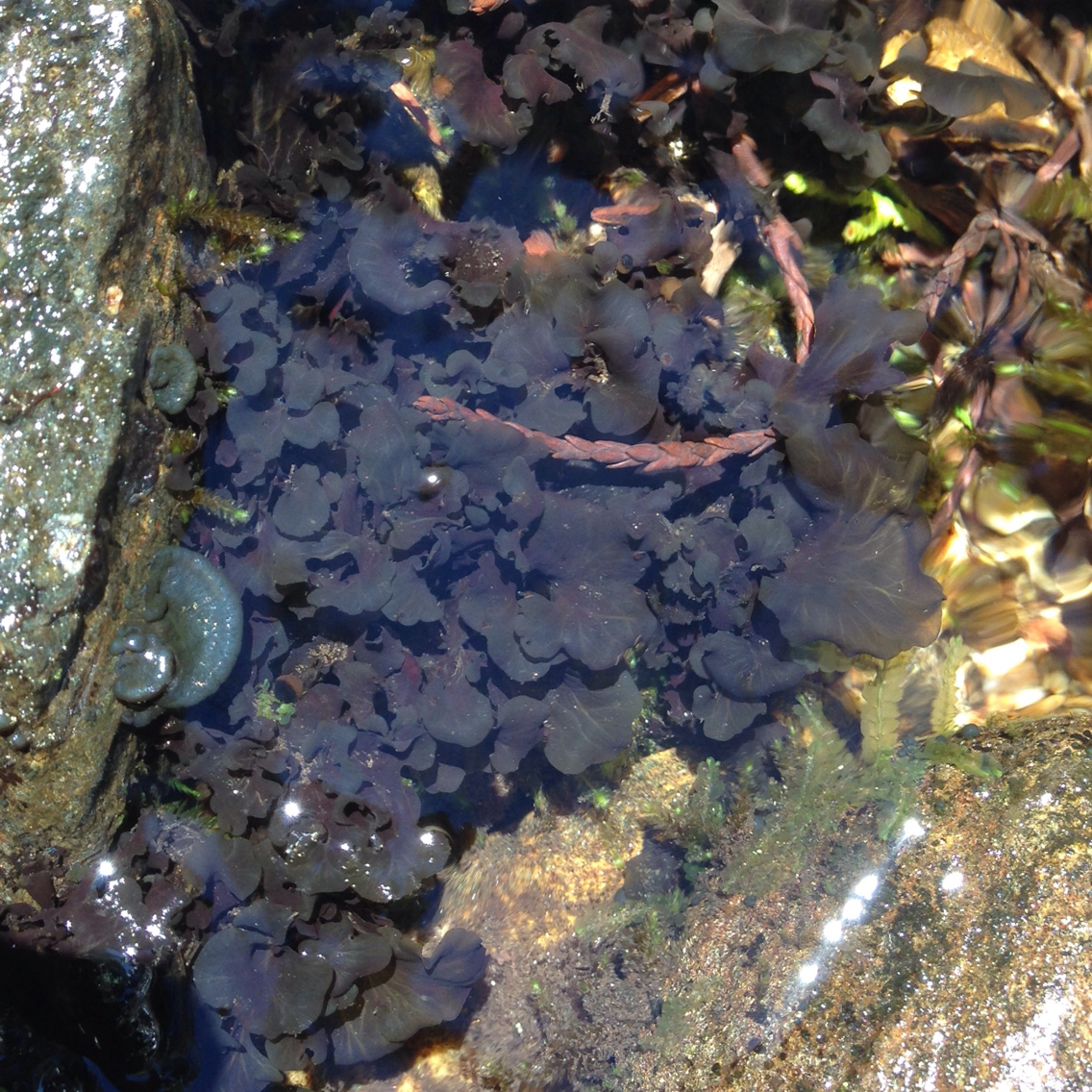
The "western waterfan" lichen, P. hydrothyria var. gowardii

=== Status and vulnerability ===
Peltigera hydrothyria is assessed as Endangered under the IUCN Red List for its eastern variety (var. hydrothyria), reflecting its restricted range, narrow habitat requirements, and ongoing population decline. In Canada, NatureServe ranks the species as SNR (unranked) nationally; the General Status of Species in Canada lists it as "May Be at Risk" in Québec and Nova Scotia and "Undetermined" in New Brunswick. In the United States, management varies by state and lacks federal protection, though many populations occur on public lands.

Peltigera hydrothyria grows only in pristine, cold, oxygen-rich streams, making it highly susceptible to environmental change. Its generation time (10–30 years, likely around 17) complicates population assessments, as does the difficulty in distinguishing individual colonies in dense aggregations. Spore discharge and reproduction often coincide with periods of lower water levels, and studies show spores germinate more effectively in groups and with certain bacterial stimuli.

=== Regional threats and habitat pressures ===
Population monitoring in the eastern United States (e.g., Pennsylvania) suggests declines linked to insufficient forested riparian buffers, poor water quality, and potential impacts from hydraulic fracturing in eastern North America. In the Southern Appalachians, elevated levels of aluminum, iron, and manganese, along with periodic low pH, degrade stream habitats, endangering both aquatic lichens and other organisms like brook trout and macroinvertebrates. In Nova Scotia and New Brunswick, current riparian buffer regulations (20–30 m) may be inadequate, as edge effects extend up to 100 m from clear-cut areas.

Western populations face similar difficulties. Habitat disturbances such as logging, road building, culvert installations, and other land-use changes increase sedimentation and disrupt hydrology. These factors, along with periodic extreme flow events, threaten the species’ stability in the Pacific Northwest and northern California. Climate change further exacerbates these issues by altering precipitation patterns, increasing drought frequencies, and raising stream temperatures.

=== Conservation measures and management recommendations ===
Historical accounts, such as William G. Farlow's 1884 observation of streams "fairly carpeted" with P. hydrothyria, note the species' sensitivity to pristine conditions. Researchers emphasize the need for baseline data and long-term monitoring to track population trends and environmental changes. Strategies include maintaining or expanding riparian forest buffers to stabilize temperature, humidity, and stream bed conditions, as well as regulating water quality standards to reduce nutrient runoff, sedimentation, and chemical pollution.

Conservation practitioners recommend establishing permanent monitoring sites and employing benthic diatom indices or predictive habitat models to identify priority areas for protection. Where logging and biomass harvesting pressures are high, additional watershed-level planning can mitigate habitat loss. Further, managing both drought and flood conditions—ensuring stable flow regimes—can preserve the integrity of stream habitats.
