= Gowardia arctica =

Scientific classification
- Domain: Eukaryota
- Kingdom: Fungi
- Division: Ascomycota
- Class: Lecanoromycetes
- Order: Lecanorales
- Family: Parmeliaceae
- Genus: Gowardia
- Species: G. arctica

Binomial name
- Gowardia arctica Halonen, Myllys, Velmala & Hyvärinen (2009)

Species of lichen

Gowardia arctica is a species of terricolous (ground-dwelling), fruticose (bushy) lichen in the family Parmeliaceae. Found in arctic regions of Northern Canada and Russia, it was formally described as a new species in 2009 by Pekka Halonen, Leena Myllys, Saara Velmala, and Heini Hyvärinen. The type specimen was collected from Banks Island in Swan Lake (Inuvialuit, Northwest Territories); here, at an elevation of 100 m (330 ft), it was found growing among mesic mountain heath. It also occurs along the Arctic Ocean coast (and associated islands) of Russia. The lichen is richly branched, black to black-brown in colour (regions close to the base may be lighter), and reaches up to 13 cm (5.1 in) in diameter. It contains alectorialic acid and two other unknown lichen products.
