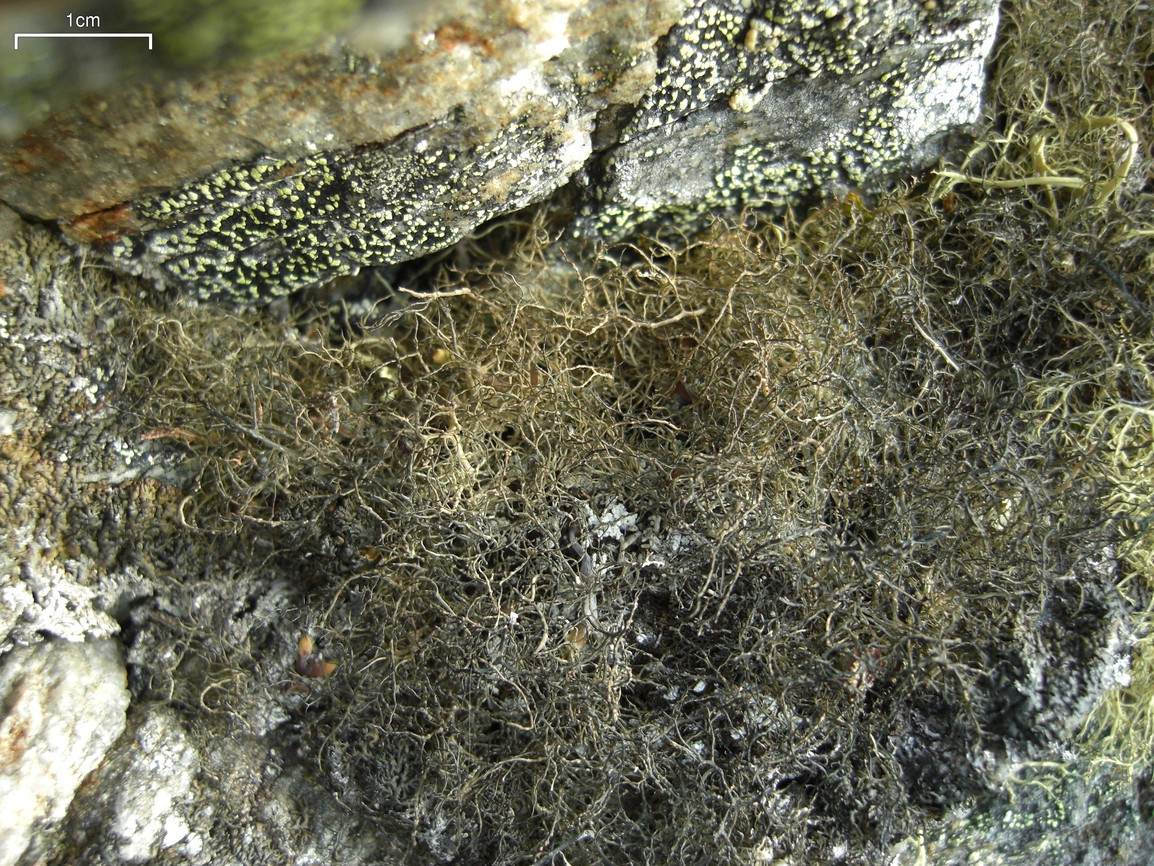
- In habitat, on Raft Mountain, Wells Gray Park, British Columbia

Conservation status
- Secure (NatureServe)

Scientific classification
- Kingdom: Fungi
- Division: Ascomycota
- Class: Lecanoromycetes
- Order: Lecanorales
- Family: Parmeliaceae
- Genus: Gowardia
- Species: G. nigricans

Binomial name
- Gowardia nigricans (Ach.) Halonen, Myllys, Velmala & Hyvärinen (2009)

Synonyms
- Cornicularia ochroleuca var. nigricans Ach. (1810)

= Gowardia nigricans =

Species of lichen

Gowardia nigricans, commonly known as the gray hair lichen or gray witch's hair, is a species of fruticose lichen in the family Parmeliaceae.

== Taxonomy ==
The lichen was first formally described by Swedish lichenologist Erik Acharius in 1810, as Cornicularia ochroleuca var. nigricans. William Nylander promoted it to distinct species status in 1862, as Alectoria nigricans. A colloquial name used in North America for the lichen is "gray witch's hair".

The form Alectoria nigricans f. goemerensis was proposed by Hungarian lichenologist Vilmos Kőfaragó-Gyelnik in 1932. The form Alectoria nigricans f. subchalybeiformis was suggested by Veli Räsänen in 1944. They are no longer considered to have independent taxonomic significance.

In 2009, Finnish lichenologists Pekka Halonen, Leena Myllys, Saara Velmala and Heini Hyvärinen proposed the new genus Gowardia, segregated from Alectoria based on phylogeny, morphology, secondary chemistry, ecology and distribution. They assigned Gowardia nigricans as the type species.

== Description ==
The shrubby thallus of Gowardia nigricans grows erect or tangled on the ground. Its main branches vary in colour from pale pinkish to nearly black, but they always have black branch tips. The surface is almost always dull. Large brown apothecia are sometimes produced.

The expected results of standard chemical spot tests are: cortex and medulla PD+ (yellow), K+ (yellow), KC+ (red), C+ (pink). The colour reactions in very dark specimens can be difficult to visualize.

== Habitat and distribution ==
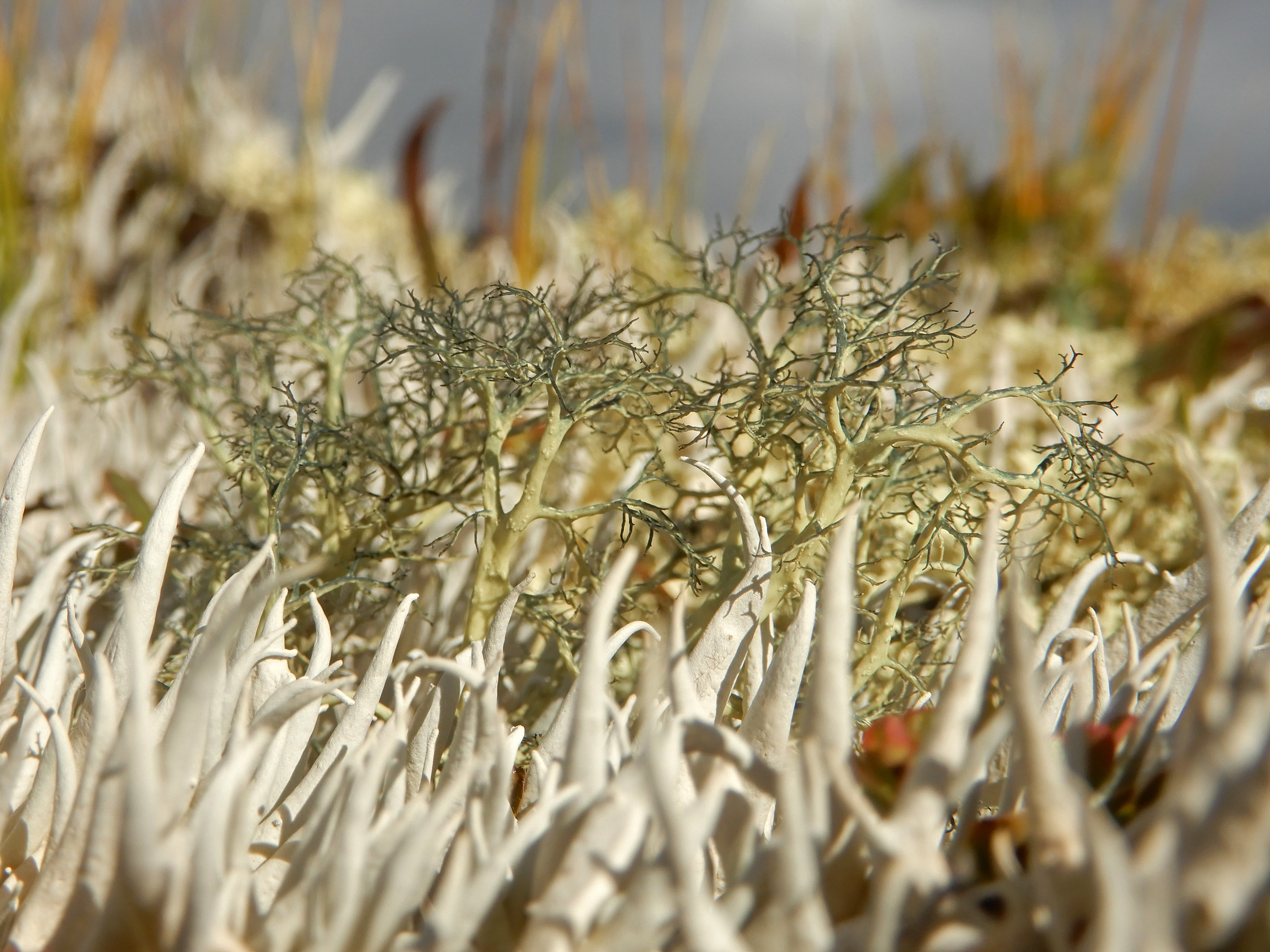
In habitat with Thamnolia vermicularis. Ukok Pletau, East Kazakhstan region, Katon-Karagay National Park

Although Gowardia nigricans typically grows on the soil, often in tundra heath, it sometimes grows on the low branches of trees or shrubs.

In Antarctica, it is found in the South Orkney Islands. It has also been recorded from Greenland and New Zealand.

== Chemistry ==
Gowardia nigricans contains alectorialic acid, barbatolic acid, alectorialin, and 5,7-dihydroxy-6-methylphthalide. Alectorialic acid has been investigated for its antiviral properties.

== Ecology ==
A study of the growth rates of various lichens consumed by grazing reindeer in Svalbard showed that Gowardia nigricans has a mean growth rate of 2.43 milligrams per gram, corresponding to a 2.5% seasonal increase in percentage of mass over 10 weeks. This was the lowest growth rate of several lichens studies, and it confirmed the conclusion of previous studies that showed that reindeer grazing damages the lichen and its slow growth hampers subsequent reestablishment.

== Biomonitoring ==
A study has shown that Gowardia nigricans could be useful as an indicator species to monitor air pollution.
