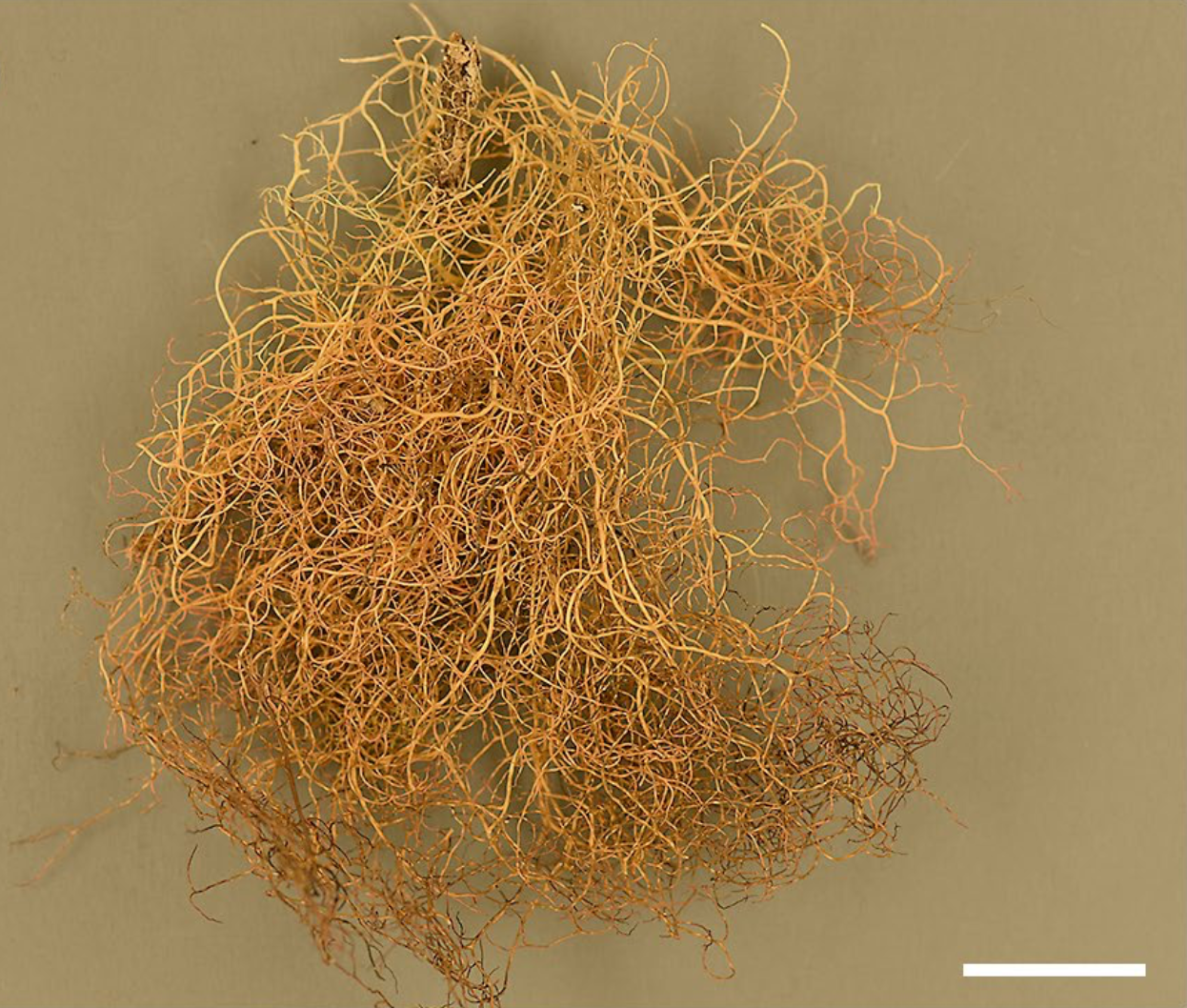
- Image of the holotype specimen; scale bar is 1 cm (0.4 in)

Scientific classification
- Domain: Eukaryota
- Kingdom: Fungi
- Division: Ascomycota
- Class: Lecanoromycetes
- Order: Lecanorales
- Family: Parmeliaceae
- Genus: Gowardia
- Species: G. zebrina

Binomial name
- Gowardia zebrina Goward & L.Myllys (2020)

= Gowardia zebrina =

Species of lichen

Gowardia zebrina is a rare species of fruticose lichen in the family Parmeliaceae. Found in Canada, it was formally described as a new species in 2020 by the lichenologists Trevor Goward and Leena Myllys. The type specimen was collected by Goward on Mount Cain (Vancouver Island) at an altitude of 1,440 m (4,720 ft). Here the lichen was found growing on the lower branches of a hemlock tree. The specific epithet zebrina refers to the diagnostic alternating pale and dark banding pattern of the terminal branches. The lichen has a limited distribution, as it is only known to occur in coastal northwest North America, extending from the Insular Mountains of southern Vancouver Island north to Hazelton. Its preferred habitat is in open, wind-scoured old growth forests, and its preferred substrate is the trunks and lower branches of conifer trees like fir and hemlock.
