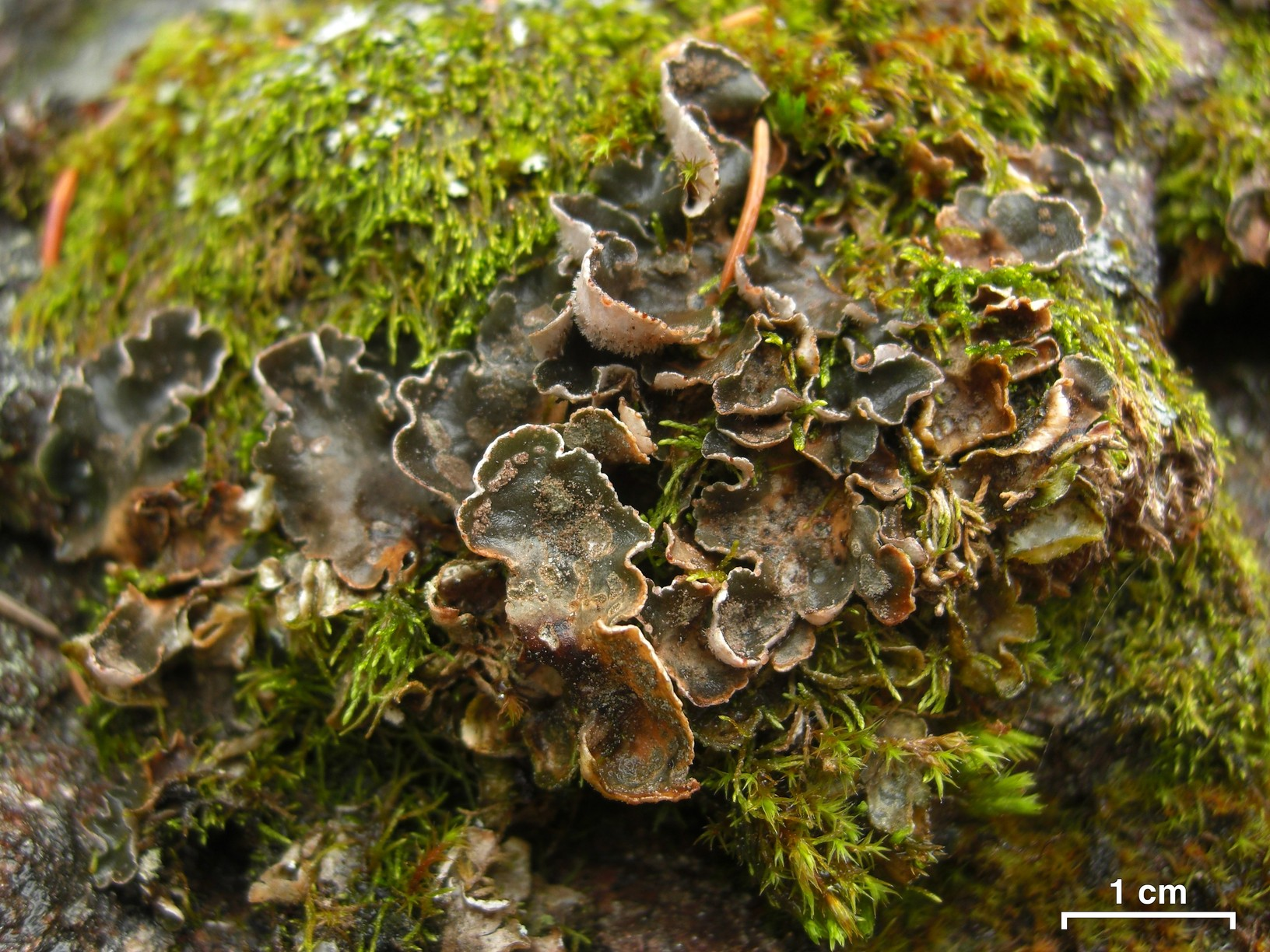

Scientific classification
- Kingdom: Fungi
- Division: Ascomycota
- Class: Lecanoromycetes
- Order: Peltigerales
- Family: Peltigeraceae
- Genus: Peltigera
- Species: P. castanea

Binomial name
- Peltigera castanea Goward, Goffinet & Miądl. (2003)
- Holotype: Clearwater River Basin, Canada

= Peltigera castanea =

Species of lichen

Peltigera castanea is a species of terricolous and muscicolous (ground- and moss-dwelling), foliose lichen in the family Peltigeraceae. Described as a new species in 2003, it is part of the taxonomically challenging species complex centred around Peltigera didactyla. Recognised based on phylogenetic studies that highlighted its unique genetic markers, P. castanea is distinguished by its dark, chestnut-coloured upper surface, which inspired its vernacular name, chestnut pelt lichen. Its known distribution includes North America (British Columbia, Western Canada), Asia (China and Siberia), Europe (Estonia), Greenland, and the Antarctic. The conservation status of Peltigera castanea varies regionally, from being critically imperiled in British Columbia and Yukon to critically endangered in Estonia due to significant habitat degradation and restricted population size.

Peltigera castanea is distinguished by its foliose, leaf-like thallus that loosely attaches to its substrate. It covers up to 30 cm (12 in) in diameter, comprising stiff, overlapping lobes that often curl upwards. Its distinctive upper surface is chestnut-brown, turning pale bluish-grey when sheltered, and features granular soredia for vegetative reproduction, housed within irregularly shaped soralia. The lichen's densely veined lower surface transitions from white to black, with tufted rhizines that become woolly towards the centre. Compared to related species in the genus Peltigera, such as P. extenuata and P. didactyla, P. castanea has a smooth, shiny, mostly non-tomentose upper cortex, darkening veins, and flocculent, often tufted rhizines, whereas its relatives show variations in lobe concavity and surface texture, including the presence of apothecia (fruiting bodies).

== Taxonomy ==
Peltigera castanea was scientifically described as a new species in 2003 by the lichenologists Trevor Goward, Bernard Goffinet, and Jolanta Miądlikowska. The lichen falls within the Peltigera didactyla species complex, a group known for its taxonomic challenges due to subtle morphological differences among its members. The species was officially recognised following phylogenetic studies, which identified it as a distinct monophyletic group—a unique evolutionary lineage—separate from other members of the Peltigera didactyla complex. These studies were based on DNA sequencing of the internal transcribed spacer region and the large subunit of the ribosomal RNA gene, demonstrating that P. castanea forms a distinct lineage and highlighting genetic variations unique to this species.

Goward collected the type specimen of Peltigera castanea in British Columbia's Clearwater River Basin, near Philip Creek along the Battle Mountain Road at an elevation of about 1,500 m (4,900 ft) on 1 October 2001. The specimen grew on a moss-covered boulder in an open, sunlit forest on a south-facing hillside. The species epithet castanea, meaning "chestnut", refers to the lichen's dark, chestnut-coloured upper surface, a trait that also inspired its vernacular name, "chestnut pelt lichen".

Phylogenetically, Peltigera castanea is closely related to other species within the Peltigera didactyla complex, such as P. lambinonii and P. ulcerata. While sharing some morphological traits, P. castanea has unique genetic markers that confirm its distinct species status. The complex itself is part of a larger grouping of lichens that have been difficult to categorize due to their overlapping morphological traits and the subtleties in chemical and genetic distinctions.

== Description ==
Peltigera castanea can be differentiated from other species within its genus by several distinctive features of its thallus, a term which refers to the body of the lichen. The thallus of Peltigera castanea is foliose, meaning it is leaf-like and loosely attached to its substrate, covering areas up to 6–8 cm (2 3/8–3 1/8 in) across, although individuals up to 30 cm (12 in) have been recorded. The individual lobes comprising the thallus are stiff, fragile, and not much longer than they are wide, with a strong concavity or sometimes flat appearance, featuring loosely overlapping and irregularly branched patterns. They are generally 1.5–3 cm (0.59–1.18 in) in diameter. The tips of the lobes are rounded and tend to curl upwards.

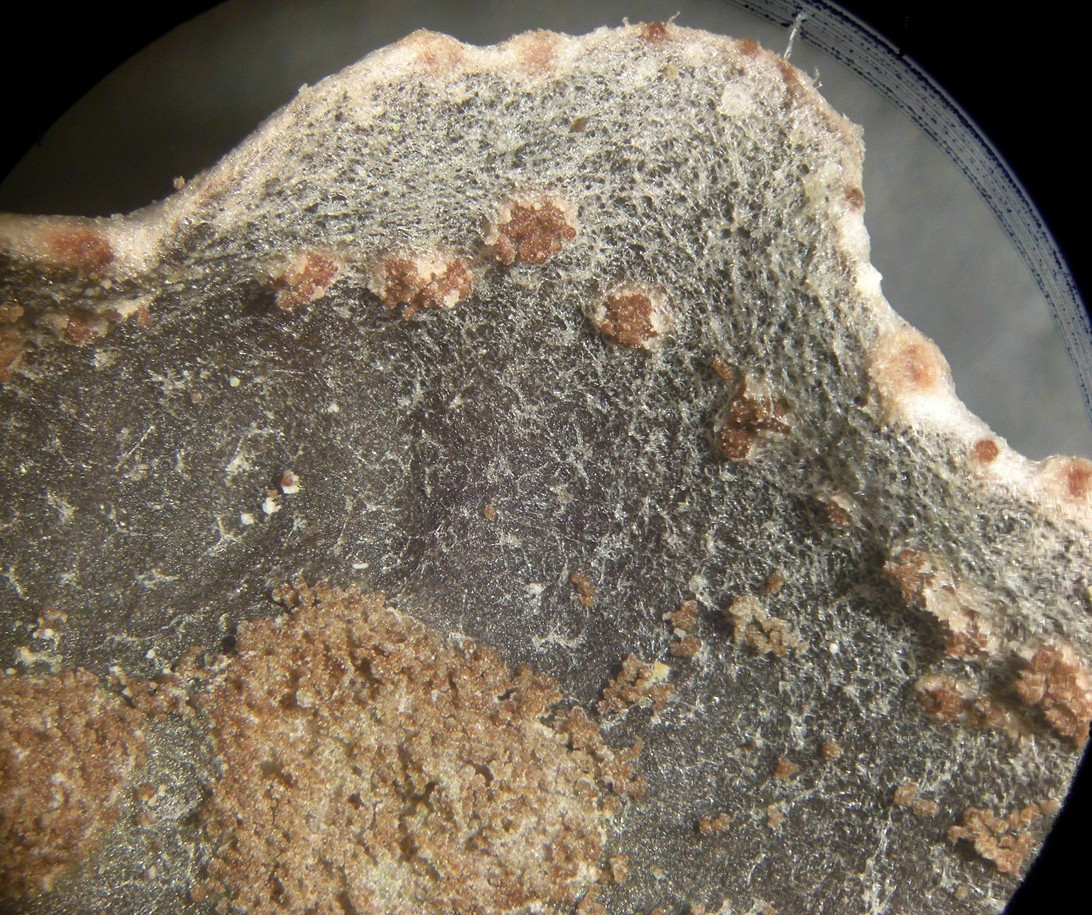
Closeup of tomentose lobe tip, irregularly shaped soralia, and granular soredia

The upper surface of the thallus is notable for its dark chestnut-brown colour, which becomes a pale bluish grey when sheltered. The surface is more or less shiny and smooth except for being tomentose (covered with short, soft hairs) near the lobe tips. This surface is also characterised by the presence of soredia—granular reproductive structures that help in vegetative reproduction—found in rounded to irregularly shaped soralia (structures that house the soredia).

The lower surface of the lichen is densely veined, gradually shifting from white at the edges to brown or black near the centre. The rhizines (root-like structures underneath the lichen) are abundant, tufted, and become flocculent (woolly) towards the centre of the thallus, matching the colour of the veins. They are up to about 1 cm (0.39 in) long, and although usually unbranched, they are often split at the tips.

In contrast, closely related species such as Peltigera praetextata have a smoother, more uniformly grey thallus with less prominent veining on the lower surface and a lack of strong colour contrast. Another similar species, Peltigera leucophlebia, has a broader thallus with a predominantly greenish hue and larger, more dispersed soralia.

The absence of apothecia (fruiting bodies) and the presence of frequent, marginal pycnidia (structures that produce asexual spores) containing ellipsoid pycnoconidia (asexual spores) further help in distinguishing Peltigera castanea from its congeners. These traits, combined with its unique colouration and texture, make Peltigera castanea a distinct species within its habitat. Like all Peltigera species, the photobiont of the lichen is cyanobacterial, visible as a dull bluish layer in the thallus. All of the standard chemical spot tests are negative in P. castanea, and no secondary metabolites (lichen products) have been detected using thin-layer chromatography.

== Similar species ==
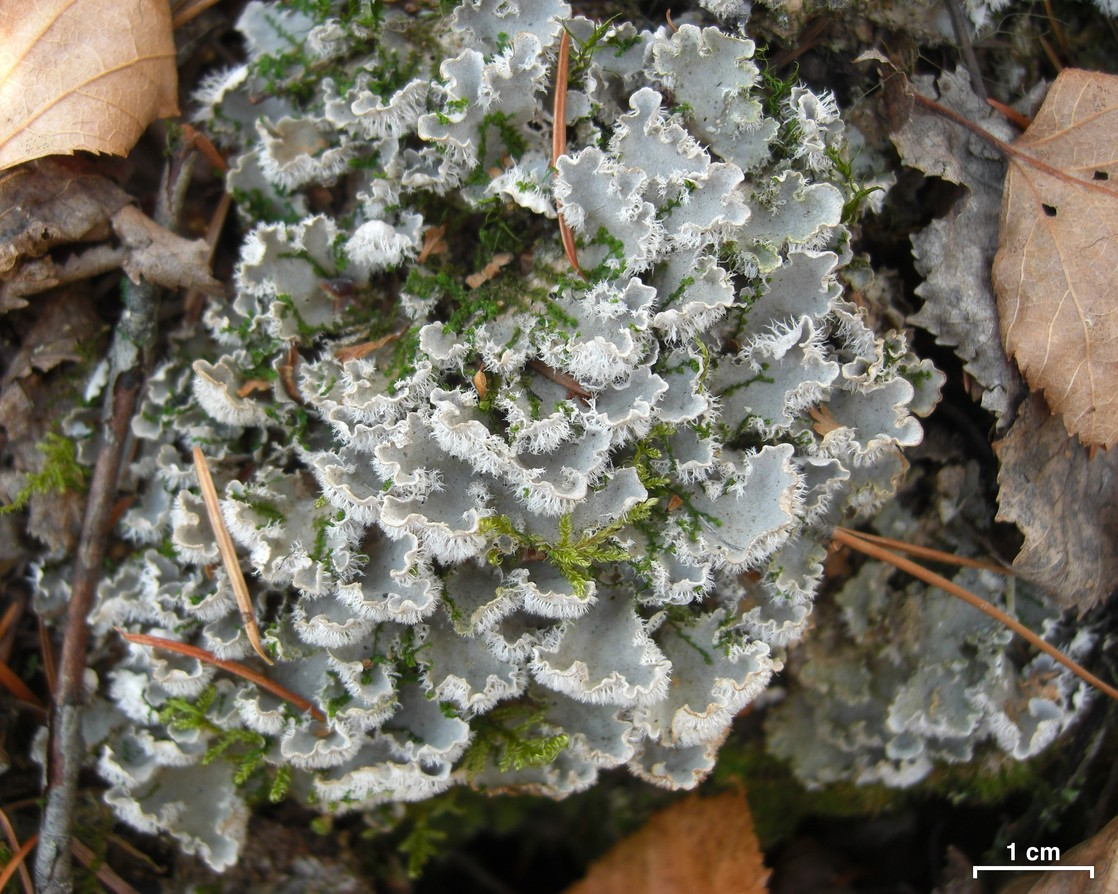
Peltigera extenuata

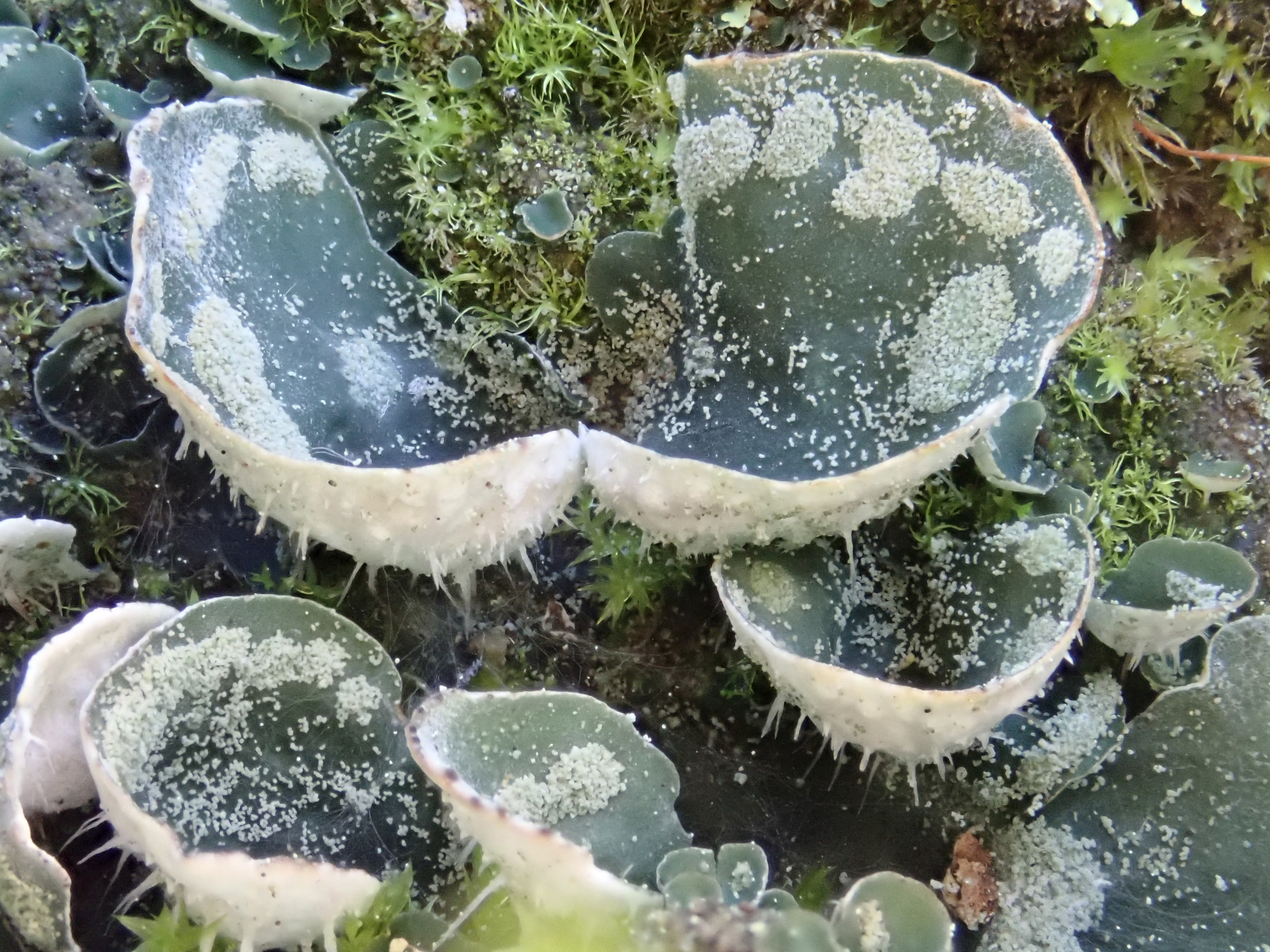
Peltigera didactyla

Several species within the genus Peltigera genus resemble Peltigera castanea, yet they have distinctive morphological traits that aid in their identification. Peltigera castanea is known for its spreading lobes with a smooth, shiny, chestnut brown, mostly non-tomentose upper cortex. The veins darken and the flocculent rhizines are often tufted and form hedgerow-like structures. This species lacks apothecia but frequently features marginal pycnidia.

Close in resemblance, Peltigera extenuata has flatter lobes with a duller, densely tomentose and minutely scabrid (crusty and rough) upper cortex that varies in colour from bluish grey to purplish brown when exposed to sunlight. Unlike P. castanea, the veins and rhizines in P. extenuata are typically pale, offering a stark contrast to the darkening veins seen in P. castanea.

Peltigera ulcerata is distinguished from P. castanea by its shiny upper surface, which remains non-tomentose, including at the margins of the lobes, and by its generally elongated soralia.

Another species, Peltigera didactyla, also shares some similarities with P. castanea, particularly in terms of the potential shininess of the upper cortex. However, fertile specimens of P. didactyla are easily identifiable by the presence of a thick tomentum covering the upper surface and the occurrence of apothecia. Sterile specimens (i.e., those lacking apothecia) require more careful distinction, characterised by a more pouch-like habit and predominantly discrete, non-flocculent rhizines. Unlike P. castanea, the cortex of P. didactyla tends to have a predominantly purplish brown hue, distinct from the chestnut tone of P. castanea.

== Habitat, distribution, and ecology ==
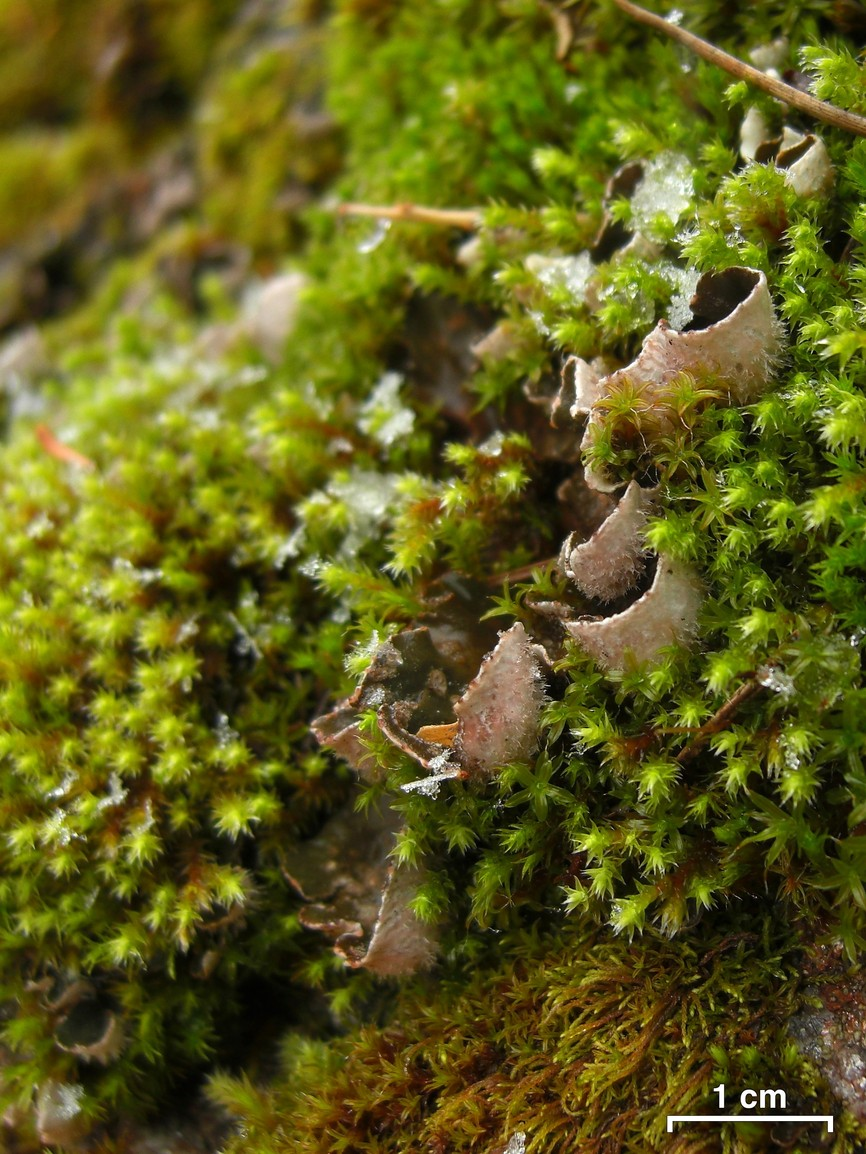
The thallus lobes of P. castanea, nestled among moss, show its typical habitat over a moss mat.

Peltigera castanea predominantly inhabits mountainous forests and alpine heaths, typically growing in open, south-facing outcrops with ideal microclimate conditions. It is often found growing on xerophytic moss mats, suggesting an affinity for drier, well-drained habitats. It has also been recorded growing directly on soil, rotten logs, or on soil or moss on top of rock. In Estonian alvar communities, it is commonly found with mosses such as Abietinella abietina, Bryum argentatum, Ceratodon purpureus, and Tortula ruralis, sharing its habitat with several rare, ground-dwelling lichens of arcto-alpine distribution.

Originally known only from northwestern North America, Peltigera castanea's range includes terricolous and muscicolous growth on rock outcrops from Alaska's Chilkoot Trail to Glacier Bay, extending east to the Yukon and south to Alberta's Rocky Mountains. It tends to become rare in the southern parts of its North American distribution. Subsequent research has revealed its presence as far northeast as Greenland and even the Antarctic Peninsula, marking the species' adaptability to a wide range of cold environments.

It also occurs in Russia and Estonia. In 2023, the species was documented in Mount Xiaowutai, Hebei, China, and its 2020 discovery on James Ross Island in the Antarctic Peninsula marked the first record of the lichen in the Southern Hemisphere. It is one of eight Peltigera species that are known to occur in the Antarctic.

== Conservation ==
The conservation status of Peltigera castanea varies by region. In British Columbia, it is critically imperiled with an "S1" status and is listed as "red" on the B.C. List, indicating it is a candidate for Extirpated, Endangered, or Threatened status. However, the Committee on the Status of Endangered Wildlife in Canada has not yet assessed it. In Alberta, the species is classified as "SU," denoting that it is unrankable due to insufficient information, while in the Yukon, it ranges from critically imperiled to imperiled ("S1S2").

In Estonia, the 2019 red list categorises Peltigera castanea as critically endangered. This designation is due to significant habitat degradation that has reduced its geographical range and habitat quality, along with its very small or restricted population size, which makes it highly vulnerable to extinction.
