= Trevor Goward =

Canadian environmentalist and lichenologist

- Born: 18 November 1952 (age 73); Vancouver
- Education: Mount Allison University, Université de Sherbrooke
- Scientific career
- Fields: Lichenology
- Workplaces: University of British Columbia herbarium
- Author abbrev. (botany): Goward

Trevor Goward (born 18 November 1952) is a Canadian environmentalist and lichenologist known for his contributions to lichenology and his environmental conservation, particularly in British Columbia. Goward has authored numerous publications on lichens, including taxonomic guides, and has conducted observational studies that challenge established scientific understandings of lichen symbiosis. Despite lacking formal training in biology, he has served as the curator of the University of British Columbia's lichen herbarium since 1989 and has had several lichen species named in his honour. In 2025, Goward received the inaugural Editor's Choice Award from the scientific journal The Lichenologist for his co-authored paper on hair lichens and the conservation of deep-snow mountain caribou.

Beyond his scientific work, Goward is an active environmental advocate, focusing on the conservation of Wells Gray Provincial Park and the protection of deep-snow caribou herds. He has initiated several educational programmes and research projects, including the Edwards-Ritcey Online Library Project and the Deertrails Naturalist Program, and the Wells Gray Education and Research Centre. In addition to scientific inquiry, Goward incorporates philosophical and spiritual perspectives in his views, advocating for what he terms an "enlivenment" perspective in understanding the natural world. His work demonstrates the potential impact of citizen science and passionate individuals on scientific understanding and conservation efforts. Goward's deep connection to his local environment is exemplified by his experiences living and working in close proximity to wilderness areas, including an incident where his dog Purple played a crucial role in his rescue after an injury.

== Early life and education ==
Trevor Goward was born in Vancouver on 18 November 1952. Having grown up in rural Kamloops, he developed a connection to nature from an early age. He earned a Bachelor of Arts degree in French and Latin in 1978, graduating at the top of his class from Mount Allison University in New Brunswick, after attending Simon Fraser University (1973–1974) and the Université de Sherbrooke in Quebec (1974–1978).

Goward discovered lichens in his early twenties, as part of a self-directed study where he dedicated each year to a different facet of the natural world. Before focusing on lichens, he had studied astronomy, insects, birds, vascular plants, and mushroom-forming fungi. His career shifted towards lichenology in 1976 when he began studying the lichens of Wells Gray Provincial Park, which had interested him since his first summer job there in 1971. His self-directed education in lichens resulted in the authorship of three books on the subject, over 80 peer-reviewed papers, the naming of two dozen lichen species, and several species named in his honour. Despite lacking formal training in biology, his expertise is recognised internationally, and he has served as the curator of the UBC lichen herbarium since 1989.

== Scientific contributions ==
Goward's work has challenged longstanding scientific understandings through observational studies and thought experiments in lichenology. Residing near Wells Gray Provincial Park, his connection to the natural environment, coupled with his dedication to lichen study, has helped challenge long-established ideas regarding lichen symbiosis.

Drawing inspiration from figures like Charles Darwin and Henry David Thoreau, Goward's approach emphasises direct observation and engagement with the natural world. His work has helped reveal complex symbiotic relationships within lichens, contributing to a shift in understanding their biology. His observations in Wells Gray Provincial Park, an area rich in biodiversity and home to diverse lichen species, have led to the identification of new species named in his honour and the publication of three taxonomic guides to lichens.

Collaborating with Toby Spribille, a lichenologist at the University of Alberta, Goward's insights informed research that identified a second fungal partner in many lichens—a discovery published in the journal Science in July 2016. This research challenged the traditional understanding of lichen symbiosis and opened new avenues for studying symbiotic relationships across biology. Between 1995 and 2009, Goward served on the lichen subcommittee of the Committee on the Status of Endangered Wildlife in Canada (COSEWIC).

Goward's writings explore both scientific and philosophical perspectives on lichens. He has published a series of essays called "Twelve Readings on the Lichen Thallus" on his blog "Ways of Enlichenment," which outline his philosophical views on lichens and their relationship to broader ecological and philosophical concepts.

Some lichens originally described by Goward
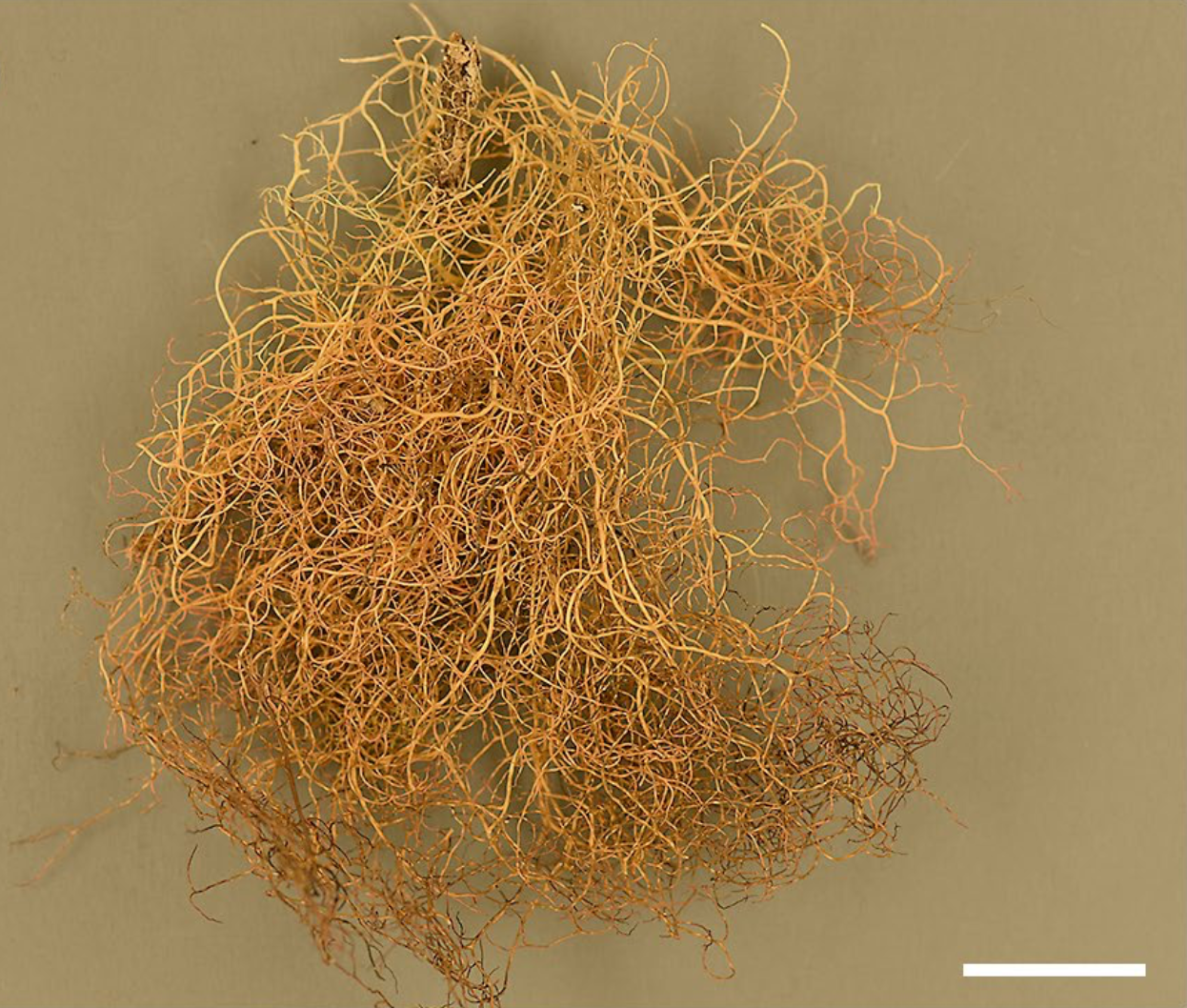
Gowardia zebrina

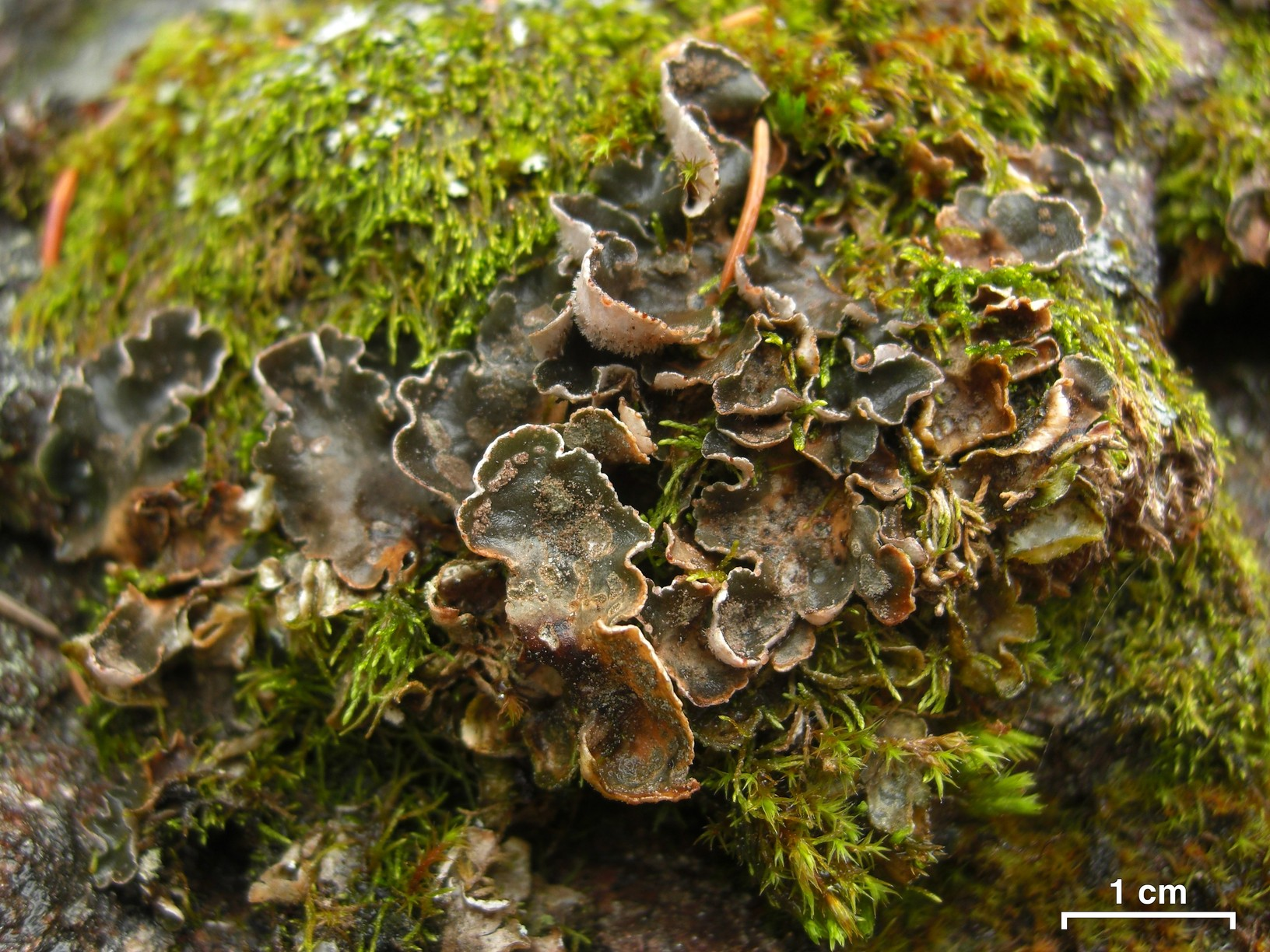
Peltigera castanea

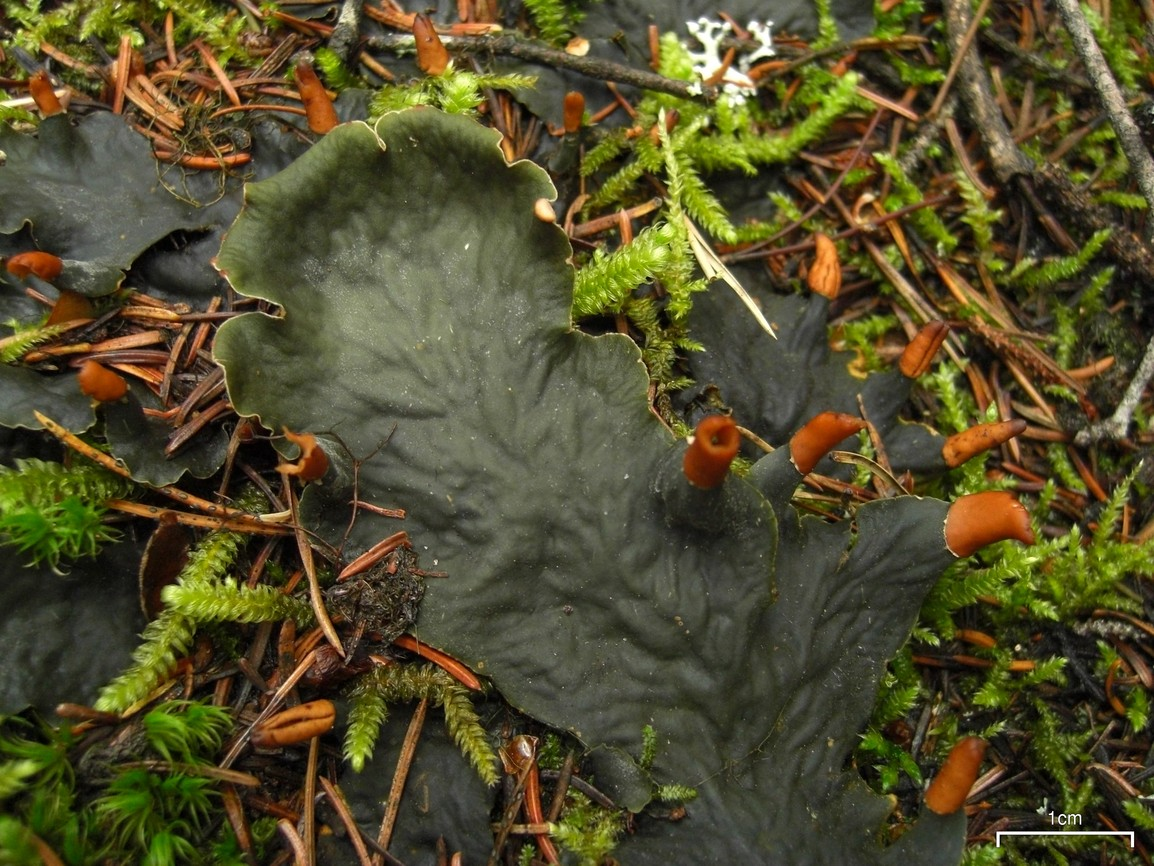
Peltigera cinnamomea

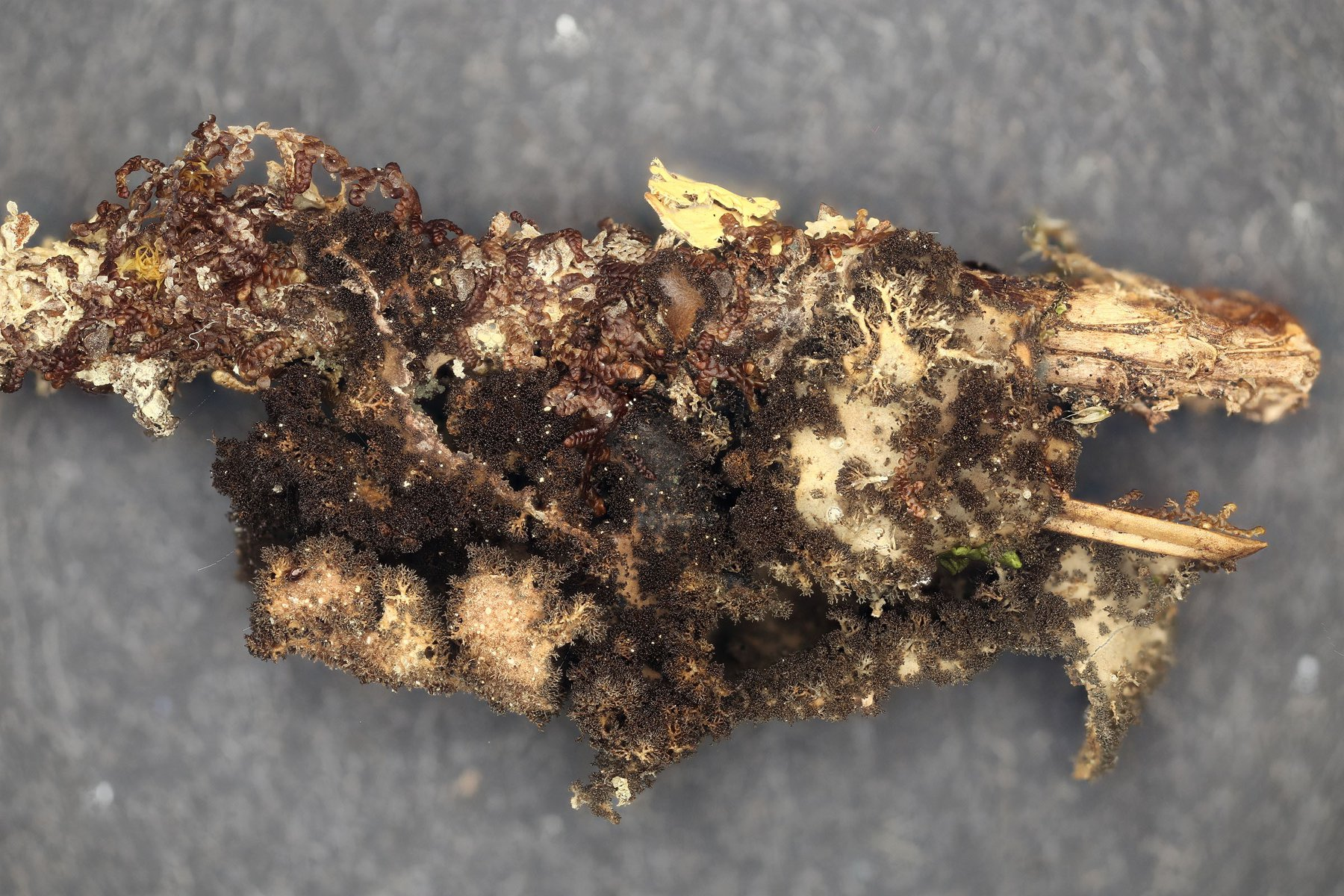
Sticta torii

== Environmental activism and conservation ==
Goward has spent significant time studying and advocating for the conservation of Wells Gray Park, where the Canadian biologist R. Yorke Edwards conducted groundbreaking research on caribou and moose in the 1950s and 1960s. Like Edwards, Goward worked as a naturalist in the park for many years and has dedicated his life to research and public education in the area.

In 1984, Goward built a home on four hectares adjacent to Wells Gray Park and developed the property into an outdoor campus for naturalists.

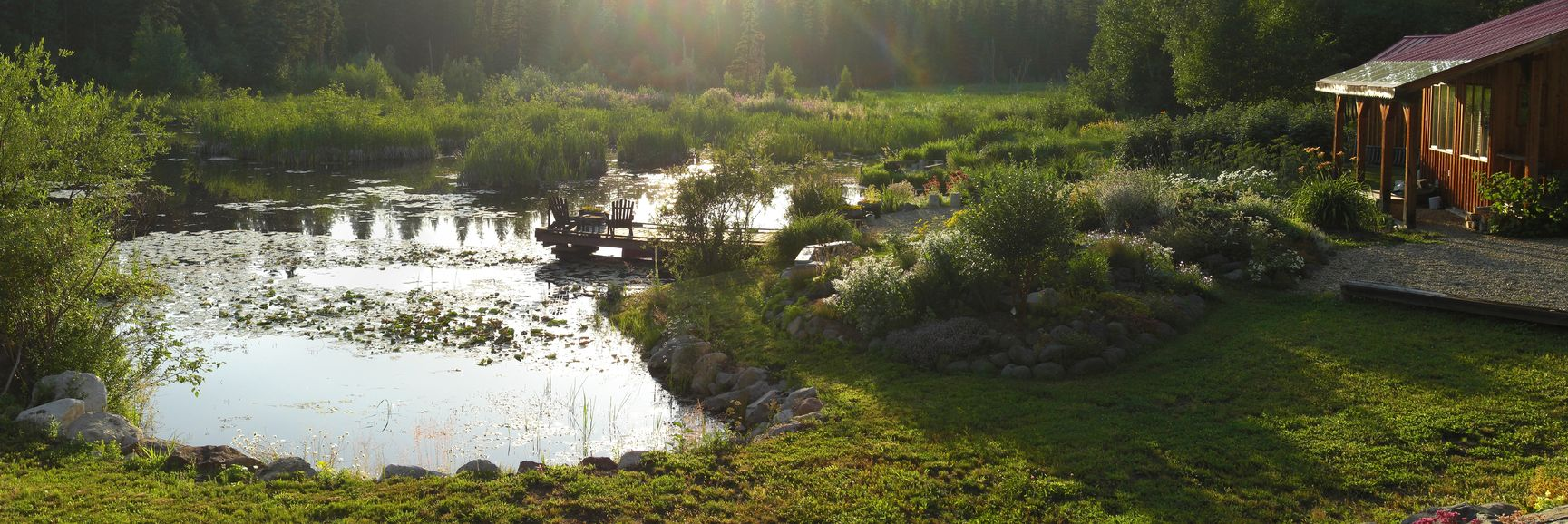
Goward resides in Edgewood Blue, adjacent to Wells Gray Park.

Goward's work has been significantly influenced by R. Yorke Edwards, a pioneer in wildlife biology, nature education, and museum curation in Canada. Goward has cited Edwards as an important influence on his environmental work. In recognition of Edwards's contributions, Goward initiated the Edwards-Ritcey Online Library Project. This project aims to digitise and make available online over 250 reports, papers, and books pertaining to Wells Gray Park. The library is named in honour of Edwards and Ralph Ritcey, whose early work on Wells Gray's wildlife created a solid foundation for future research.

In addition to his scientific work, Goward has been active in environmental causes, opposing plans to dam the Clearwater River in the early 1970s and advocating for the conservation of Wells Gray Park. He co-founded the Friends of Wells Gray Park and played a role in establishing the Wells Gray Education and Research Centre, which operates out of the former Upper Clearwater schoolhouse.

In an interview with The Land Conservancy, Goward discussed his involvement in the Clearwater Wetlands and Wildlife Corridor campaign. He described the natural history of his property, shaped by glacial movements 11,000 years ago, which now supports a diverse wetland ecosystem. Goward explained how the Clearwater Valley serves as a migratory route for many large species, emphasizing the importance of maintaining wildlife corridors to preserve ecological integrity. Goward donated his property, Edgewood Blue, to The Land Conservancy to help establish a wildlife corridor near Wells Gray Park.

After discovering two new lichen species near Clearwater, B.C., Goward auctioned their naming rights to raise funds for conservation projects. The goal was to raise $350,000 for the Ancient Forest Alliance and The Land Conservancy to protect B.C.'s old-growth forests and expand Wells Gray Provincial Park.

In October 2019, while hiking near his home, Goward dislocated his shoulder after falling. Unable to return home due to pain and approaching dusk, he sent his seven-year-old Australian Shepherd, Purple, to seek help. The dog alerted Goward's partner, Curtis Björk, who then organised a rescue effort involving neighbours and the Upper Clearwater Fire Brigade. Björk followed Purple back to Goward's location, where they found him suffering from shock and hypothermia. Wells Gray Search and Rescue was contacted, and after about 14 hours from the initial fall, Goward was helped down the mountain on foot. The incident demonstrated Purple's crucial role in the rescue and underscored the utility of GPS equipment in local rescue operations.

=== Caribou conservation efforts ===
Goward has monitored and advocated for the conservation of deep-snow caribou herds in British Columbia. He has closely observed the Wells Gray South caribou herd for decades, documenting its decline from approximately 350 animals to about 140 over a 20-year period.

Goward argues that government-sanctioned logging in core caribou habitat amounts to what he terms "designer extinction." He points out that while about 40% of the Wells Gray South herd's core range is within a provincial park, only one-fifth of its extended range is protected, leaving the herd vulnerable to human-induced predation resulting from clearcut logging.

Goward launched a website focused on the decline of deep-snow mountain caribou, attributing their endangerment to logging practices. The site details decades of resource decisions that have negatively impacted caribou herds and criticises what Goward sees as government-orchestrated extinction.

Goward has highlighted the importance of old-growth forests for caribou survival, particularly the role of arboreal hair lichen as a winter food source. He notes that logging of old-growth forests at lower elevations has disrupted traditional caribou migration patterns and food sources.

== Educational initiatives ==
In 1991, with the help of many others and the involvement of the University College of the Cariboo (now Thompson Rivers University), Goward established the Wells Gray Education and Research Centre.

On 5 October 2013, Goward organised "Yorke Edwards' Day in Wells Gray", a tribute to British Columbia's "Father of Interpretation". A highlight of the event was the sod-turning ceremony for the Wells Gray TRU Wilderness Centre. Goward and his then-partner Helen Knight donated land to Thompson Rivers University for the development of the Wells Gray TRU Wilderness Centre. Goward envisions Edgewood becoming a hub for naturalist education and research, reflecting his commitment to sustainable living and the importance of local natural exploration.

In collaboration with The Land Conservancy of British Columbia, Goward launched the Deertrails Naturalist Programme in May 2019. This program is described as "an intergenerational, place-based learning opportunity designed to facilitate the transfer of naturalist knowledge, both scientific and traditional".

Since 2008, Goward and his partner Curtis Björk have hosted a series of "lichen revival workshops" at their Edgewood Blue property and other venues. The events assemble professional lichenologists, students, and amateur enthusiasts for field trips, laboratory sessions, and guest lectures covering lichen taxonomy, ecology, conservation, symbiosis, species identification, and the use of lichens as environmental indicators, all in support of Goward's aim to broaden public engagement with lichenology.

== Recognition and impact ==
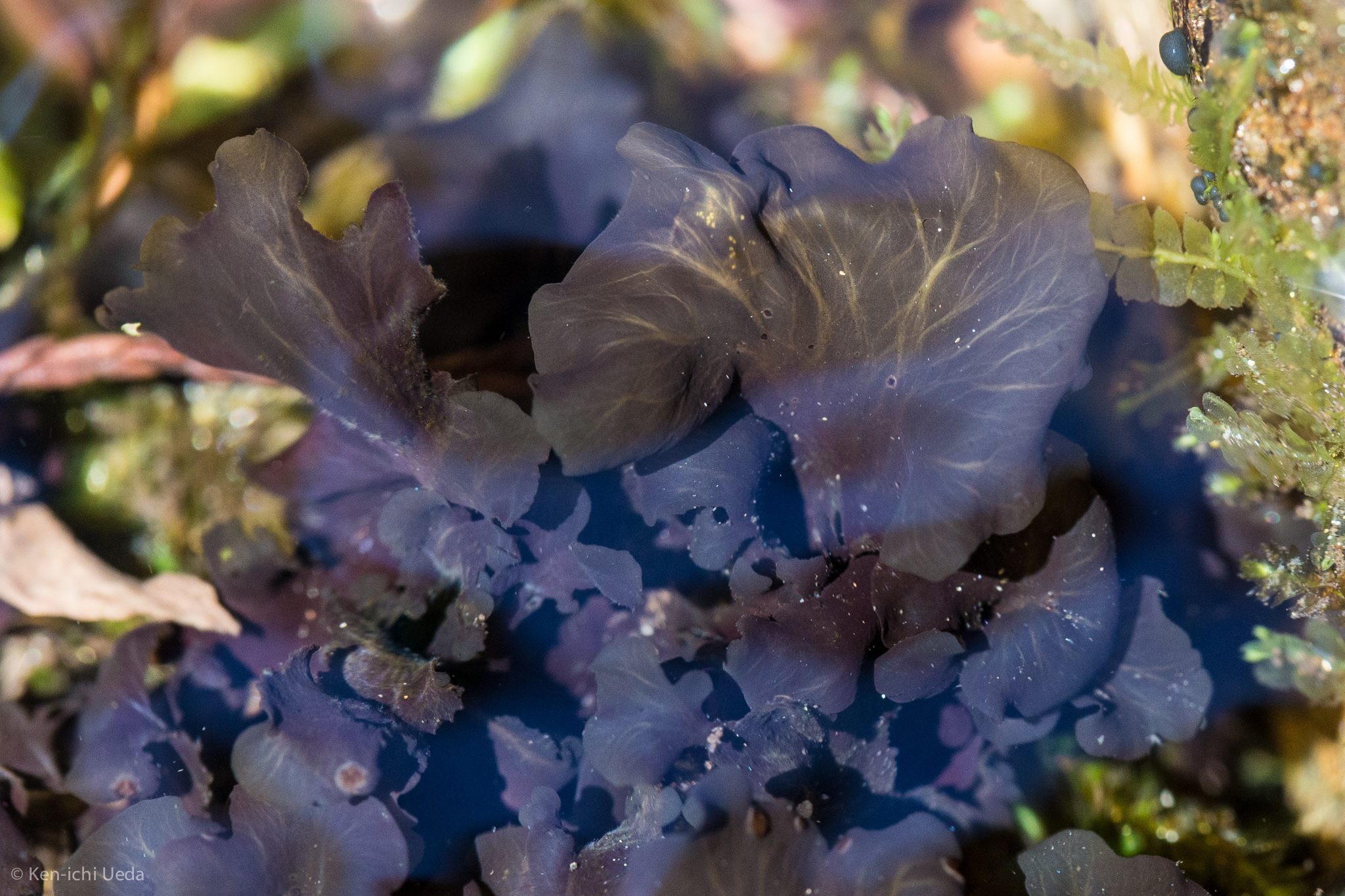
The aquatic lichen Peltigera gowardii is one of several taxa named after Goward.

Goward's work in lichenology includes extensive naturalistic observation, interdisciplinary approaches, and the integration of traditional knowledge with scientific inquiry, as evidenced by his respect for First Nations people's understanding of the natural world.

The Parmeliaceae genus Gowardia was named in his honour in 2009, in recognition of his "remarkable and ongoing work on North American lichens". He also has several species named after him: Ochrolechia gowardii Brodo (1991); Sphaerellothecium gowardii Alstrup & M.S.Cole (1998); Pyrrhospora gowardiana T.Sprib. & M.Hauck (2003); Alectoria gowardii Lumbsch (2010); and Peltigera gowardii Lendemer & O'Brien (2011).

In 2025, the journal The Lichenologist awarded its inaugural "Editor's Choice Award" to a paper co-authored by Goward, "The Manna Effect – a review of factors influencing hair lichen abundance for Canada's endangered Deep-Snow Mountain Caribou". The award recognised the study's combination of field-based natural history with rigorous empirical analysis, and its relevance to broader conservation concerns, particularly the survival of mountain caribou and the management of forest habitats. Two of Goward's co-authors dedicated the award specifically to him, citing his self-taught expertise, conceptual contributions to lichen ecology, and his widely quoted description of lichens as "fungi that discovered agriculture". The journal's editorial team described him as an outstanding contributor whose career exemplifies the values of passion, perseverance, and intellectual curiosity that the award was intended to honour.

== Current work and future vision ==
Goward envisions promoting Wells Gray Park as a UNESCO World Heritage Site to highlight its international significance and support the local economy. His efforts focus on understanding and conserving the natural environment, demonstrating the contributions individuals outside traditional academic pathways can make to science and conservation. Through his consulting business, Enlichened Consulting Ltd., Goward continues to contribute to the scientific community and public perceptions of wilderness conservation and the intricate world of lichens.

== Legacy and philosophy ==
Beyond research, Goward aims to increase biological literacy and foster a deeper connection between people and the natural environment. His dedication to conservation and education is reflected in his land donation to Thompson Rivers University for a research centre and his ongoing efforts to engage with a broad audience through writing and hosting discussions at his home, Edgewood Blue. Goward advocates for a shift from what he calls the "Enlightenment narrative" to an "Enlivenment" perspective, which combines reductionist science with holistic, ecosystem-based approaches traditionally practised by Indigenous peoples.

== Selected publications ==
A complete listing of Goward's publications is available on the Edgewood Wild website. Some representative or highly cited publications follow:

- Goward, T. (1986). "Brodoa, a new lichen genus in the Parmeliaceae". Bryologist. 89 (3): 219–223. doi:10.2307/3243288. JSTOR 3243288.
- Goward, T.; Ahti, T. (1992). "Macrolichens and their zonal distribution in Wells Gray Provincial Park and its vicinity, British Columbia, Canada". Acta Botanica Fennica. 147: 1–60.
- Goward, T. (1994). "Notes on oldgrowth-dependent epiphytic macrolichens in the humid oldgrowth forests in inland British Columbia, Canada" (PDF). Acta Botanica Fennica. 150: 31–38.
- Goward, Trevor; McCune, Bruce; Meidinger, Del (1994). The Lichens of British Columbia: Illustrated Keys. Part 1 — Foliose and Squamulose Species. Victoria, B.C.: Ministry of Forests Research Program. pp. 1–190. ISBN 0-7726-2194-2. OCLC 31651418.
- Goward, Trevor (1999). The Lichens of British Columbia: Illustrated Keys. Part 2–Fruticose Species. Victoria, B.C.: Ministry of Forests, Research Program. pp. 1–327. ISBN 0-7726-2194-2. OCLC 31651418.
- Goward, Trevor; Arsenault, André (2000). "Cyanolichen distribution in young unmanaged forests: a dripzone effect?". The Bryologist. 103 (1): 28–37. doi:10.1639/0007-2745(2000)103[0028:CDIYUF]2.0.CO;2. JSTOR 3244277.
- Goward, Trevor; Arsenault, André (2001). "Cyanolichens and conifers: implications for global conservation" (PDF). Forest Snow and Landscape Research. 75: 303–318.
- Goward, Trevor; Arsenault, André (2018). "Calicioid diversity in humid inland British Columbia may increase into the 5th century after stand initiation". The Lichenologist. 50 (5): 555–569. doi:10.1017/S0024282918000324.
- Goward, Trevor; Coxson, Darwyn; Gauslaa, Yngvar (2024). "The Manna Effect – a review of factors influencing hair lichen abundance for Canada's endangered Deep-Snow Mountain Caribou (Rangifer arcticus montanus)". The Lichenologist. 56 (4): 121–135. doi:10.1017/S0024282924000161.

== See also ==
- Category:Taxa named by Trevor Goward
