= John Lewis Russell =

- Born: December 2, 1808; Salem, Massachusetts
- Died: June 2, 1873 (aged 64); Salem, Massachusetts

John Lewis Russell (2 December 1808 – 7 June 1873) was an American botanist and Unitarian minister. Born in Salem, Massachusetts, Russell attended Harvard University and received his early education in Salem, Newburyport and Amesbury. He earned a bachelor's degree in 1828 and a divinity degree in 1831 before becoming a minister, his profession until 1854. Russell had an interest in cryptogams (plants that reproduce using spores), and he was Professor of Botany and Horticultural Physiology for the Massachusetts Horticultural Society from 1831 until his death in 1873. The bolete fungus Boletellus russelli is named in his honor.
