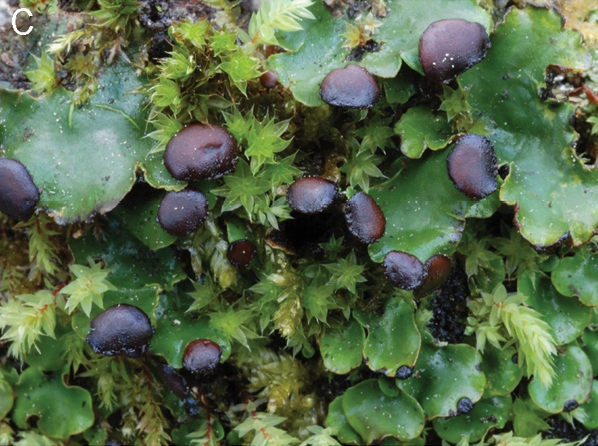

Conservation status
- Secure (NatureServe)

Scientific classification
- Kingdom: Fungi
- Division: Ascomycota
- Class: Lecanoromycetes
- Order: Peltigerales
- Family: Peltigeraceae
- Genus: Peltigera
- Species: P. venosa

Binomial name
- Peltigera venosa (L.) Hoffm. (1789)

Synonyms
- Lichen venosus L. (1753); Peltidea venosa (L.) Ach. (1803)

= Peltigera venosa =

Species of lichen-forming fungus

Peltigera venosa, commonly known as the fan lichen, is a species of foliose lichen in the family Peltigeraceae. It was first described by Carl Linnaeus in his 1753 work Species Plantarum as Lichen venosus. German botanist Georg Franz Hoffmann transferred it to the genus Peltigera in 1789. P. venosa can be found in temperate and boreal regions of North America, Europe, and Asia, while occasionally being found in drier climates such as mountainous Arizona.

The thallus color depends on its level of hydration: when wet, it is deep green, while when dry it is dark grey-green. The lobes that comprise the thallus are rounded to fan-shaped, and measure 10–15mm wide. The upper surface is smooth, while the lower surface is white with raised black veins. The apothecia (which are nearly always present) are round, flat, and reddish-brown.

== See also ==
- List of lichens named by Carl Linnaeus
