= Peltigera papuana =

Scientific classification
- Domain: Eukaryota
- Kingdom: Fungi
- Division: Ascomycota
- Class: Lecanoromycetes
- Order: Peltigerales
- Family: Peltigeraceae
- Genus: Peltigera
- Species: P. papuana

Binomial name
- Peltigera papuana Sérus., Goffinet, Miądl. & Vitik. (2009)

Species of lichenised fungus

Peltigera papuana is a lichen-forming fungus in the family Peltigeraceae. It was described in 2009 from Madang Province of Papua New Guinea, which inspired its specific epithet. Genetic analysis of both the mycobiont and the photobiont, which is a Nostoc cyanobacterium, suggests that the evolutionary origin of Pelitgera papuana is from an ancient dispersal event from South America, although this remains inconclusive.

== Classification ==
Peltigera papuana is part of the Peltigera rufescens group and it is most related to Peltigera granulosa, Peltigera laciniata, and Peltigera wulingensis. Genetically, the monophyly of Peltigera papuana is not well supported. It has high intraspecific variation in its internal transcribed spacer-region, which is commonly used in phylogeny. This variation may indicate the presence of multiple unrecognized species within P. papuana.

== Description ==
Peltigera papuana forms rounded rosettes reaching 10–12 cm (3.9–4.7 in) in diameter under ideal conditions. Its lobes are overlapping, generally narrow at 0.5–0.7 cm wide, featuring raised, crenate (scalloped) edges, which occasionally display a crisped appearance. These margins swell and turn as lobes initiate apothecium (fruiting body) development, often adorned with tiny, whitish tufts of hair. The upper surface presents a range of colours from orange brown and beige brown to grey brown, and infrequently, bluish grey. This surface may be smooth or show a light to markedly rough texture, interspersed with tiny translucent hairs concentrated particularly around the lobe edges. Near the extremities of younger lobes, a whitish-pruinose coating gives a frosted look; some thalli show longitudinal cracks. The lateral margins tend to become incised-lacerate, forming flat, branched lobules that are typically fragile and detach easily. In mature specimens, these lobules can evolve into distinct, brittle digitate phyllidia up to 0.2 cm long, occasionally featuring tomentose or pruinose tips that are noticeably enlarged.

The thallus underside is whitish, with interwoven medullary hyphae and a bluish hue from the photobiont, especially visible under a dissecting microscope. It has a well-defined network of slightly raised veins measuring 0.2–0.3 mm across, coloured pale orange to brown near the margins and darker brown to black elsewhere, separated by whitish, elliptical gaps primarily around the edges. Rhizines are plentiful, long, dark brown to black, and vary from thread-like to brush-like, with occasional branching and rare confluences.

Apothecia are frequently observed, numerous, and typically develop horizontally from an early stage on swollen and sometimes tomentose lobes. The discs are dark reddish brown, initially concave and partially obscured by vegetative remnants, giving them a crenate appearance, but they flatten or become irregularly rounded and ellipsoid as they mature, usually measuring smaller than 6 by 4 mm. The margins of these discs are typically incised-crenulate, and the lobes bearing them are notably tomentose. Ascospores are fusiform, relatively narrow with vaguely pointed ends, and 3 to 5 internal partitions (septa), typically measuring 38–51 by 4–5 μm. Pycnidia (asexual reproductive structures) are extremely rare, manifesting as small, swollen, brownish spots on the margins of lateral lobes; conidia are absent.

== Chemistry ==
Thin layer chromatography did not reveal any secondary metabolites in Peltigera papuana that could serve as characters to distinguish between species. However, the absence of such compounds could serve as an accessory identifier of the species.
