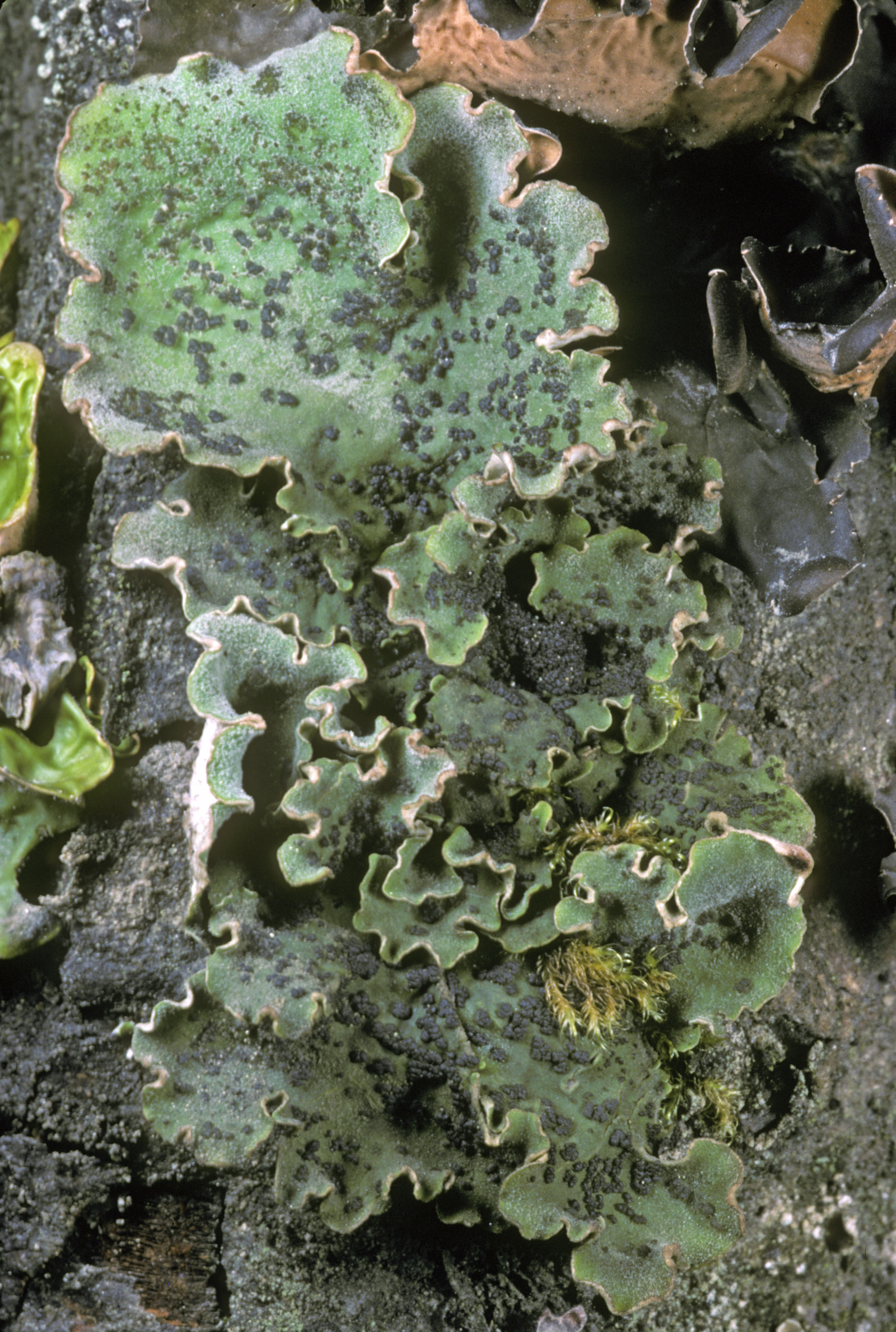
- In Alaska

Scientific classification
- Kingdom: Fungi
- Division: Ascomycota
- Class: Lecanoromycetes
- Order: Peltigerales
- Family: Peltigeraceae
- Genus: Peltigera
- Species: P. latiloba

Binomial name
- Peltigera latiloba Holt.-Hartw. (2005)

= Peltigera latiloba =

Species of lichen-forming fungus

Peltigera latiloba is a species of lichen-forming fungus in the family Peltigeraceae. It is a large, leafy (foliose) lichen with broad, boat-shaped lobes and a hairy upper surface, growing on mossy ground in subalpine and low-alpine habitats. Like other members of the P. aphthosa group, it is a trimembered lichen, housing both a green alga and a cyanobacterium as photosynthetic partners. It was described in 2005 from Norway and Alaska, and has since been recorded from Greenland, East Karelia, and Kamchatka.

== Taxonomy ==
Peltigera latiloba was formally described as a distinct species by the Norwegian lichenologist Jon Holtan-Hartwig in 2005, based on material from Norway and Alaska. In his earlier monograph on Norwegian Peltigera (excluding the P. canina group), Holtan-Hartwig treated the same taxon informally as "Peltigera sp. 1" within the P. aphthosa group. The species was described as similar to P. leucophlebia, but differing in its usually broader lobes, a densely hairy (tomentose) upper surface, and a netlike, pitted lower surface. Holtan-Hartwig's 1993 treatment provides the fuller morphological discussion of the taxon under the provisional name "Peltigera sp. 1".

The type specimen was collected in Norway (Finnmark, Karasjok Municipality), just south of the river Njiv'lujågas, at about 130 m elevation, in moist birch forest on a steep east-facing slope. Holtan-Hartwig reported the species from Oppland, Sør-Trøndelag, and Finnmark in Norway, and from three localities in Alaska.

In broader molecular phylogenies of Peltigera, P. latiloba is placed in section Chloropeltigera, a trimembered lineage that is closely allied to section Peltidea (the P. aphthosa group). A multilocus phylogenetic study of section Chloropeltigera recovered P. latiloba as a distinct lineage nested within P. leucophlebia sensu lato, indicating that species limits in this group are complex. Some delimitation analyses in the same study suggested that P. latiloba itself might include more than one lineage, but the authors treated it as a single species pending broader sampling and clearer diagnostic characters. The study also found that species in section Chloropeltigera associate with multiple Nostoc lineages and with two species of the green algal photobiont Coccomyxa, consistent with comparatively broad partner choice within this section.

== Description ==
Peltigera latiloba is a large foliose lichen, with thalli reaching about 30 cm across. Its lobes are typically broad (about 3–4 cm wide, occasionally to 6 cm), boat-shaped, and have ascending, scalloped (crenulate) margins. The upper surface is pale greyish green and often finely furrowed or bumpy, and it is covered with hyaline hairs extending well beyond the lobe-ends towards the centre of the thallus. Small cephalodia (small cyanobacteria-bearing nodules) occur on the upper surface and are greyish blue and brain-like in form, reaching about 1 mm in diameter. The main photobiont is a green alga, while the cyanobacterial partner is housed in these external cephalodia.

The lower surface has a broad pale marginal zone and a darker central area, and it shows an irregular pattern of depressions that gives it a netlike, pitted appearance. Rhizines (root-like anchoring strands) are dark brown to black, bush-shaped, and mostly separate. Apothecia are reported as not uncommon, and are saddle- to finger-shaped on elongated lobes, with a reddish-brown disc that can reach about 10 mm in diameter. The spores are 3-septate and needle-like, measuring about 55–62 × 4.5–5.0 μm. Holtan-Hartwig reported two chemotypes that share the same main set of lichen substances but differ in minor components detected by thin-layer chromatography.

Fertile thalli of section Peltidea can be separated from often co-occurring P. latiloba (and P. leucophlebia) by the lower side of the apothecia, which is continuous-corticate in section Peltidea but ecorticate or only patchily corticate in P. latiloba. Because broad-lobed, trimembered Peltigera can show overlapping morphology and chemistry, sequence data are sometimes used to confirm identifications in difficult material.

== Habitat and distribution ==
In Norway, the species occurs on the ground in well-developed, fluffy moss carpets, especially in subalpine birch forests and low-alpine dwarf-shrub vegetation. The type locality in Finnmark was in moist birch forest on a steep east-facing slope at about 130 m elevation. Holtan-Hartwig reported Norwegian records from Oppland, Sør-Trøndelag, and Finnmark. It has also been recorded from Greenland, East Karelia, and from northern Kamchatka, Russia. In the latter record, the lichen was parasitized by the lichenicolous fungus species Arthonia peltigerea.
