= Lichenopeltella santessonii =

Scientific classification
- Domain: Eukaryota
- Kingdom: Fungi
- Division: Ascomycota
- Class: Dothideomycetes
- Order: Microthyriales
- Family: Microthyriaceae
- Genus: Lichenopeltella
- Species: L. santessonii

Binomial name
- Lichenopeltella santessonii (P.M.Kirk & Spooner) R.Sant. (1993)

Synonyms
- Micropeltopsis santessonii P.M.Kirk & Spooner (1990)

Species of fungus

Lichenopeltella santessonii is a species of lichenicolous fungus (a fungus that grows on lichens) belonging to the class Dothideomycetes. It forms small, dark fruiting bodies on various lichen species, primarily those in the genus Peltigera, and has been documented in several Nordic countries including Finland, Sweden and Iceland. The fungus can be distinguished from related species by its larger spore-producing structures and spores.

== Taxonomy ==
The fungus was first formally described as a new species of Micropeltopsis in 1990 by the mycologists Paul Kirk and Brian Spooner. The specific epithet honours the Swedish lichenologist Rolf Santesson, who collected the type specimen in Sala Municipality, Sweden, where it was growing on the foliose lichen Peltigera canina. Santesson transferred the taxon to the genus Lichenopeltella in 1993.

== Description ==
Lichenopeltella santessonii is a lichenicolous fungus with distinctive catathecioid ascomata (fruiting bodies) that are superficial, dark brown to black, and measure 100–120 μm in diameter. The fruiting bodies sometimes feature short setae (hair-like structures) around the ostiole (opening).

The asci (spore-producing structures) are bitunicate (having two walls), measure 34–50 by 11–12 μm, and typically contain eight spores. The ascospores are elongate-ellipsoid, 12–17 by 3–5 μm, with a single septum (internal wall). These spores may be slightly constricted at the septum and sometimes contain guttules (oil droplets). Neither paraphyses nor periphyses (sterile filaments within the fruiting body) have been observed in this species.

Lichenopeltella santessonii can be distinguished from the related species L. peltigericola by its larger ascomata, asci, and ascospores.

== Habitat and distribution ==
Lichenopeltella santessonii inhabits a variety of lichen hosts. The fungus forms on the older thalli of several Peltigera lichen species, usually growing on the veins of the underside of thallus lobes, but occasionally also appearing on the upper surface. It has been found on Peltigera aphthosa, P. canina, P. leucophlebia, P. praetextata, P. rufescens, and P. scabrosa, as well as on Lobaria linita, L. pulmonaria, and Nephroma expallidum. In Iceland, it has been recorded growing on Peltigera aphthosa near Svartifoss. In Finland, L. santessonii appears to be widely distributed, with records spanning from the southern regions to Lapland in the north. Collection data indicates the species is relatively frequent throughout its range rather than being confined to specific geographical areas. Beyond Finland, the species has been documented in Sweden, suggesting a broader Fennoscandian distribution.
