= Peltigera koponenii =

Scientific classification
- Domain: Eukaryota
- Kingdom: Fungi
- Division: Ascomycota
- Class: Lecanoromycetes
- Order: Peltigerales
- Family: Peltigeraceae
- Genus: Peltigera
- Species: P. koponenii

Binomial name
- Peltigera koponenii Sérus., Goffinet, Miądl. & Vitik. (2009)

Species of lichen

Peltigera koponenii is a species of foliose lichen in the family Peltigeraceae. Found in Papua New Guinea, it was formally described as a new species in 2009 by Emmanuël Sérusiaux, Bernard Goffinet, Jolanta Miądlikowska, and Orvo Vitikainen. The type specimen was collected near Lake Wanba at an altitude of 2,400–2,500 m (7,900–8,200 ft), where it was found growing on a tree trunk in an open montane forest of Nothofagus and Pandanus. The species epithet honours Finnish bryologist Timo Koponen, "who made large and well processed collections of Peltigera in Papua New Guinea".

== Description ==
This lichen species forms large thalli that can reach up to 20 cm (8 in) in diameter. The elongated lobes are typically sparingly divided, with rounded lobes measuring 0.5–0.8 mm wide at the extremities and a revolute margin. The upper surface is usually pale grey or slightly orange, sometimes bluish-grey, with an appressed, whitish to pale brown tomentum covering much of the surface. The lower surface is whitish to beige or pale brown, with a network of pale orange to brownish, distinctly raised veins. Rhizines are abundant to extremely abundant, forming dense cushions or bushy masses that are usually long. Apothecia may be absent or abundant, growing almost vertically on raised, and revolute lobes. Ascospores have three septa, and are acicular and straight, with somewhat rounded ends; they measure 44–53 by 4–4.5 μm.

== Habitat and distribution ==
Peltigera koponenii is an epiphytic lichen species that grows on mossy trunks and branches in montane and subalpine forests. It can also be found overgrowing terrestrial moss cushions in the subalpine zone and on gravel by rivers or streams, as well as on artificial substrates such as hedges or garden fences in the montane forest zone. This species is also able to grow on tree fern trunks in deep valleys characterized by rare but acute frosts and irregular fires. Its altitudinal range is from 1,850 to 4,270 m (6,070 to 14,010 ft).
