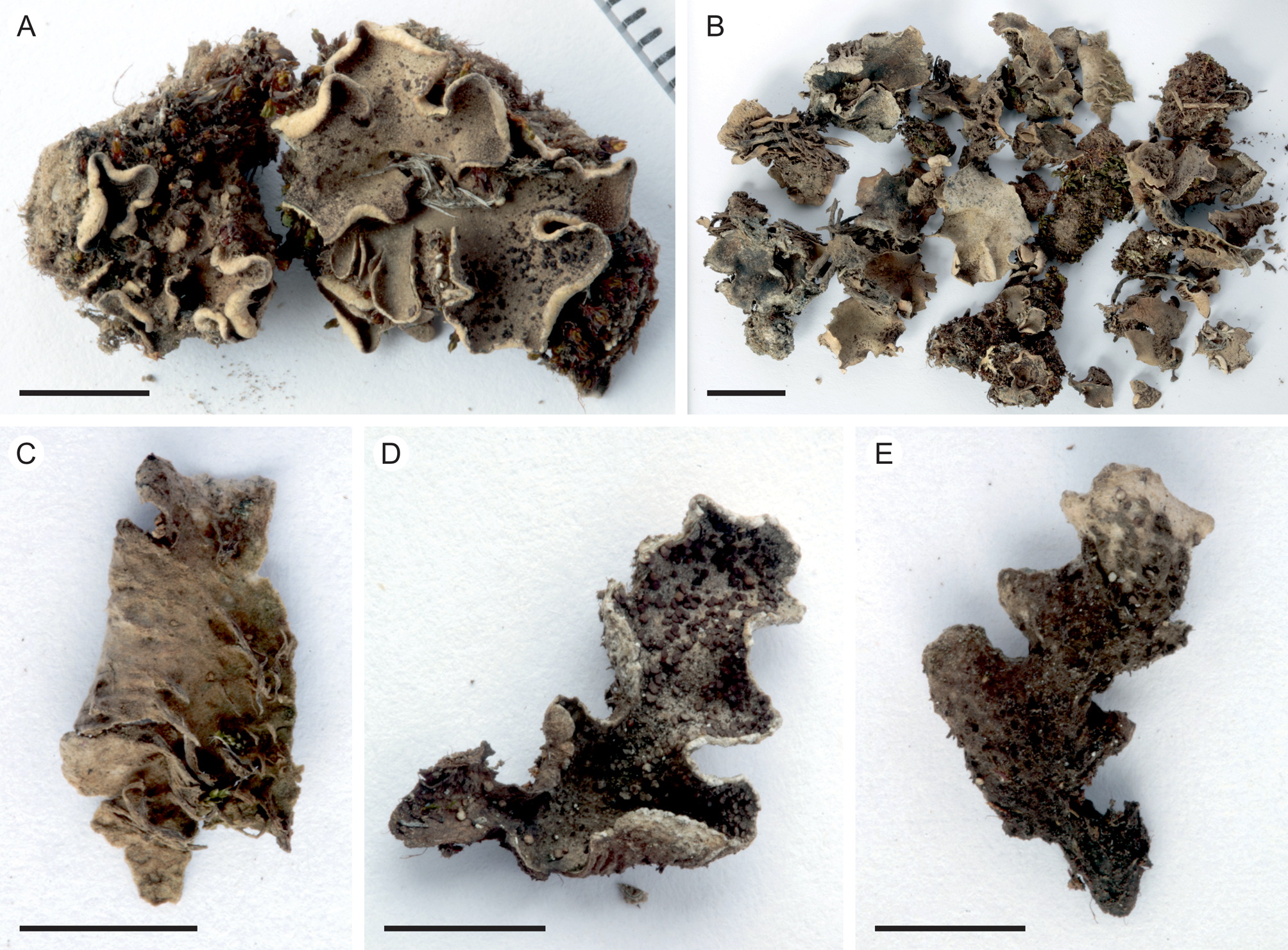
- Various images of Peltigera alkalicola; scales: A, C–E = 0.5 cm; B = 1 cm

Scientific classification
- Kingdom: Fungi
- Division: Ascomycota
- Class: Lecanoromycetes
- Order: Peltigerales
- Family: Peltigeraceae
- Genus: Peltigera
- Species: P. alkalicola

Binomial name
- Peltigera alkalicola Kaasalainen (2022)
- Holotype: Kilimanjaro National Park, Tanzania

= Peltigera alkalicola =

Species of lichen found in high-altitude habitats

Peltigera alkalicola is a rare species of terricolous (ground-dwelling) foliose lichen in the family Peltigeraceae. First described in 2022 from specimens collected in the Kilimanjaro National Park in Tanzania, it is characterised by its unique ecological preferences. Analysis of DNA samples indicate that the lichen may also occur in Alaska, USA, and Ningxia, China, suggesting a wider distribution in cold, montane ecosystems.

== Taxonomy ==
Peltigera alkalicola was formally described by the Finnish lichenologist Ulla Kaasalainen in 2022. It is closely related to Peltigera lepidophora but can be distinguished by its smaller size, the distinct colour of its isidia, and its genetic makeup. The type specimen of Peltigera alkalicola was collected in Tanzania within the Kilimanjaro National Park, specifically between the Maua and Marangu routes. It was found on soil amidst Helichrysum heath at an elevation of 4,390 m (14,400 ft). This collection, made on 8 June 2017, is designated as the holotype. The specific epithet alkalicola refers to the species' preference for alkaline substrates, particularly the alkaline trachybasaltic lava found in its type locality.

== Description ==
Peltigera alkalicola forms a small thallus, typically 1–5 cm (3/8–2 in) in diameter, but usually smaller, about 1–2 cm (3/8–3/4 in). It has thick, rounded to elongate lobes that are up to 1–2 cm long and 1 cm wide. The lobes often have rounded ends with upturned margins and may appear slightly crisped. The upper surface is tomentose, often slightly scabrous, and greyish-brown in colour. In contrast, the lower surface is generally white to pale brown, with veins that are the same colour or slightly darker and rhizines that are more abundant centrally, becoming shorter near the margins. This species develops peltate isidia, which are small, dark brown to almost black outgrowths on the upper surface that are distinctly darker than the thallus surface.

The species does not typically produce apothecia (sexual reproductive structures) or pycnidia (asexual reproductive structures), and no secondary metabolites (lichen products) have been detected by thin-layer chromatography. All standard chemical spot tests are negative.

== Habitat, distribution, and ecology ==
Peltigera alkalicola is found in high-elevation habitats, specifically in open, subalpine and alpine heathlands at elevations between 3,940 and 4,390 m (12,930 and 14,400 ft). It is adapted to growing on trachybasaltic volcanic rock, a type of alkaline substrate, and is often associated with sparse vegetation and bryophytes. At the time of its original publication, the species was known to occur only from a few locations on Mt Kilimanjaro and is considered rare. The collection sites for Peltigera alkalicola receive between 900 and 1,100 mm (35 and 43 in) of rainfall annually, maintain a relative humidity of 60 to 80%, and have an average annual temperature of 4 °C (39 °F).

Initially discovered in Tanzania, genetic analysis suggests that Peltigera alkalicola may also be present in Alaska, USA, and Ningxia, China, indicating a wider distribution across diverse and extreme habitats. This distribution pattern highlights the species' preference for cold, montane regions and alkaline substrata.
