= Peltigera montis-wilhelmii =

Scientific classification
- Domain: Eukaryota
- Kingdom: Fungi
- Division: Ascomycota
- Class: Lecanoromycetes
- Order: Peltigerales
- Family: Peltigeraceae
- Genus: Peltigera
- Species: P. montis-wilhelmii

Binomial name
- Peltigera montis-wilhelmii Sérus., Goffinet, Miądl. & Vitik. (2009)

Species of lichen

Peltigera montis-wilhelmii is a rare species of corticolous (bark-dwelling), foliose lichen in the family Peltigeraceae. Found in Papua New Guinea, it was formally described as a new species in 2009 by Emmanuël Sérusiaux, Bernard Goffinet, Jolanta Miądlikowska, and Orvo Vitikainen. The type specimen was collected from Pindaunde valley on Mount Wilhelm (Chimbu Province) at an altitude of 3,600 m (11,800 ft). The species epithet refers to the type locality.

== Description ==
The lichen has circular thalli that are 5–7 cm (2.0–2.8 in) across with rounded lobes up to 4 mm wide. The upper surface is smooth and shiny with an orange-chamois to brownish colour, while the lower surface is whitish to pale orange-brown. The lichen has abundant rhizines that are typically fasciculate and apothecia, which are few but present on almost all thalli examined, are typically horizontal with reddish-brown disc. The ascospores are fusiform to acicular and have rounded ends, typically have 3 septa (sometimes up to five), and measure 50–61 by 4–5 μm. Pycnidia were not seen in this species. No lichen products were detected using thin-layer chromatography.

== Habitat and distribution ==
Peltigera montis-wilhelmii is a rare lichen that has only been found in the Mt. Wilhelm area. It typically grows on branches in the upper montane forest zone and on the trunk of tree ferns in the subalpine forest, at elevations ranging from 2,800 to 3,600 m (9,200 to 11,800 ft).
