= Peltigera weberi =

Scientific classification
- Domain: Eukaryota
- Kingdom: Fungi
- Division: Ascomycota
- Class: Lecanoromycetes
- Order: Peltigerales
- Family: Peltigeraceae
- Genus: Peltigera
- Species: P. weberi

Binomial name
- Peltigera weberi Sérus., Goffinet, Miądl. & Vitik. (2009)

Species of lichen

Peltigera weberi is a rare species of foliose lichen in the family Peltigeraceae. It is found in Papua New Guinea, where it grows on road banks and on earth and rock debris.

== Taxonomy ==
The lichen was formally described as a new species in 2009 by Emmanuël Sérusiaux, Bernard Goffinet, Jolanta Miądlikowska, and Orvo Vitikainen. The type specimen was collected from the road just above Goroka (Eastern Highlands Province) at an altitude of 4,000 ft (1,200 m), where it was found growing on clay banks beside the road. The species epithet honours American lichenologist William Alfred Weber, who collected the type specimen in 1968 and, according to the authors, "was the first lichenologist to collect lichens extensively in Papua New Guinea".

Within the genus Peltigera, P. weberi belongs to section Polydactylon, and molecular phylogenetic analysis shows that it is closely related to P. oceanica and P. nana.

== Description ==
The thallus of Peltigera weberi is small and inconspicuous, made of rounded lobes that are typically 0.5 cm (0.2 in) large near the extremities. The upper surface is smooth and typically dull, while the lower surface is orange to greyish with a poorly developed network of slightly raised veins. Soralia, typically marginal, are always present, and rhizines are simple to fasciculate and not abundant.

The use of thin-layer chromatography revealed the presence of four lichen products: methylgyrophorate, tenuiorin, dolichorhizin and zeorin.

== Habitat and distribution ==
Peltigera weberi is a rare Papuan species that grows on earth and rock debris, as well as on road banks, at elevations between 1,200 and 1,450 m (3,940 and 4,760 ft).
