= Peltigera fimbriata =

Scientific classification
- Domain: Eukaryota
- Kingdom: Fungi
- Division: Ascomycota
- Class: Lecanoromycetes
- Order: Peltigerales
- Family: Peltigeraceae
- Genus: Peltigera
- Species: P. fimbriata

Binomial name
- Peltigera fimbriata Vitik., Sérus., Goffinet & Miądl. (2009)

Species of lichen

Peltigera fimbriata is a species of foliose lichen in the family Peltigeraceae. Found in Papua New Guinea, it was formally described as a new species in 2009 by lichenologists Orvo Vitikainen, Emmanuël Sérusiaux, Bernard Goffinet, and Jolanta Miądlikowska. The type specimen was collected between Mt. Sarawaket Southern Range and Iloko village (Morobe Province) The species epithet fimbriata refers to the characteristic long hairs that occur on the upper thallus surface.

== Description ==
Peltigera fimbriata can form large colonies in suitable environments, with thalli growing up to 20–30 cm (8–12 in) across, and lobes up to 1–1.5 cm (0.4–0.6 in) wide, with a revolute margin. The upper surface can vary in color, ranging from pale grey or orange-brown to almost white, and may have a thick and dense whitish tomentum, with threadlike hairs that are usually abundant and form tufts near the margins. The lower surface is typically pale orange with a network of strongly raised veins that become dark brown to black, leaving large ellipsoid interstices. Rhizines are abundant and can form cushions or fluffy masses, while apothecia and phyllidia are either absent or present in small numbers.

== Habitat and distribution ==
Peltigera fimbriata forms large thalli that are typically found on bare soil or gravel near rivers or streams, as well as in grasslands and recent landslides. It is most commonly found in the montane zone, but can also be found in the subalpine and alpine zones. In addition, it can grow on shaded road banks and other artificial habitats. In New Guinea, P. fimbriata has the widest altitudinal range among all Peltigera species, growing from altitude ranges from 1,300 to 4,145 m (4,270 to 13,600 ft).
