= Peltigera serusiauxii =

Scientific classification
- Domain: Eukaryota
- Kingdom: Fungi
- Division: Ascomycota
- Class: Lecanoromycetes
- Order: Peltigerales
- Family: Peltigeraceae
- Genus: Peltigera
- Species: P. serusiauxii

Binomial name
- Peltigera serusiauxii Magain, Miadl., Goffinet & Ant.Simon (2020)

Species of lichen

Peltigera serusiauxii is a species of foliose lichen in the family Peltigeraceae. It is found in Papua New Guinea and Sabah, northern Borneo (Malaysia). It was described as a new species in 2020 by Nicolas Magain, Jolanta Miadlikowska, Bernard Goffinet, and Antoine Simon. The type was collected in Mount Gahavisuka Provincial Park (Eastern Highlands Province), where it was found growing in a mostly undisturbed mossy mountain forest dominated by chinquapin trees. The specific epithet honours Belgian lichenologist Emmanuël Sérusiaux, "who substantially contributed to our understanding of the world-wide diversity of Peltigera, especially in Papua New Guinea where he collected the type material among several other specimens of this new species".
