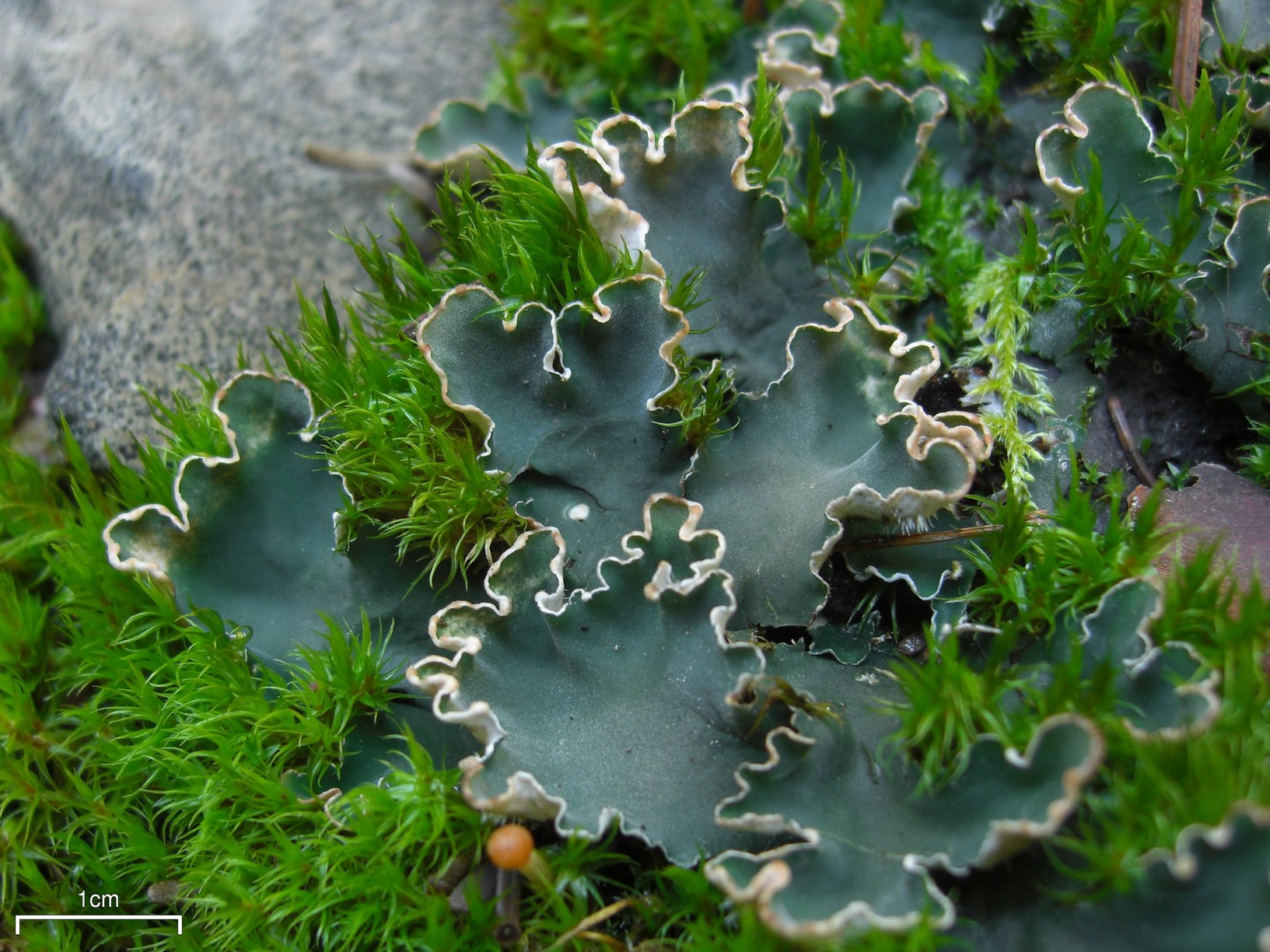

Conservation status
- Secure (NatureServe)

Scientific classification
- Kingdom: Fungi
- Division: Ascomycota
- Class: Lecanoromycetes
- Order: Peltigerales
- Family: Peltigeraceae
- Genus: Peltigera
- Species: P. malacea

Binomial name
- Peltigera malacea (Ach.) Funck (1827)

Synonyms
- Peltidea malacea Ach. (1814); Peltidea canina var. malacea (Ach.) Wahlenb. (1826); Peltigera canina var. malacea (Ach.) Branth & Rostr. (1869)

= Peltigera malacea =

Species of lichen-forming fungus

Peltigera malacea, commonly called veinless pelt or felt lichen, is a species of lichenized fungus in the family Peltigeraceae.

In Nepal, Peltigera malacea has been reported from 2,700 to 3,300 m elevation in a compilation of published records.
