= Peltigera vainioi =

Scientific classification
- Domain: Eukaryota
- Kingdom: Fungi
- Division: Ascomycota
- Class: Lecanoromycetes
- Order: Peltigerales
- Family: Peltigeraceae
- Genus: Peltigera
- Species: P. vainioi

Binomial name
- Peltigera vainioi Gyeln. (1929)

Synonyms
- Peltigeropsis vainioi (Gyeln.) V.Marcano & A.Morales (1994)

Species of lichen

Peltigera vainioi is a species of lichen in the family Peltigeraceae. It is found in high-elevation locations in South America. It is a somewhat unusual species in its genus, characterized by a single holdfast that attaches to its substrate, and pores in its cortex.

== Taxonomy ==
Peltigera vainioi was first formally described as a new species by Hungarian lichenologist Vilmos Gyelnik in 1929, based on specimens that had been collected in Colombia in 1860 by Alexander Lindig. The specific epithet honours Finnish lichenologist Edvard August Vainio, who died that year. In the Latin description for the species Gyelnik mentions the smooth upper surface, the soredia, and the lower surface with the presence of a single rhizine in the centre, similar to Peltigera venosa. A few years later, Gyelnik wrote that the presence of cyanobacteria in the thallus of Peltigera vainioi distinguished it from Peltigera venosa, which contained green algae in the thallus.

In 1994, Venezuelan lichenologists Vicente Marcano and Antonio Morales Méndez proposed erecting a new genus Peltigeropsis to accommodate this species, which would have then been called Peltigeropsis vainioi (Gyeln.) V.Marcano & A.Morales. However, the name was not published validly because it did not follow the conventions of the code for botanical nomenclature, namely, the basionym was not indicated and the reference was omitted.

== Description ==
Peltigera vainioi has a club-shaped (clavate) thallus with a short stipe; it measures up to 2 cm (0.8 in) by 1.5 cm (0.6 in) wide. It grows on the ground, to which it is attached by a single holdfast. The upper surface of the thallus is smooth and bluish-grey. It has tiny pores that are 5–6 μm long by 0.75 by 1.57 μm wide. The upper cortex is paraplectenchymatous (a cell arrangement where the hyphae are oriented in all directions), and measures 72–82 μm thick. Soralia are found on the upper margin of the thallus; soredia are granular with a bluish colour. Pycnidia and apothecia are absent.

The photobiont of Peltigera vainioi is a species of Nostoc, with cells that are 5.4–3.6 μm in diameter. These algal cells are contained in a continuous tissue layer, 44–50 μm thick, below the upper cortex.

== Habitat and distribution ==
Peltigera vainioi is found in South America. It has been reported from Brazil, Ecuador, Venezuela, and Colombia. It has been collected from elevations ranging from 2,000–3,300 m (6,600–10,800 ft). In Venezuela, where it appears to be locally abundant, it is typically found growing on the ground in thin, sandy soil, near the mosses Bryum and Polytrichum.
