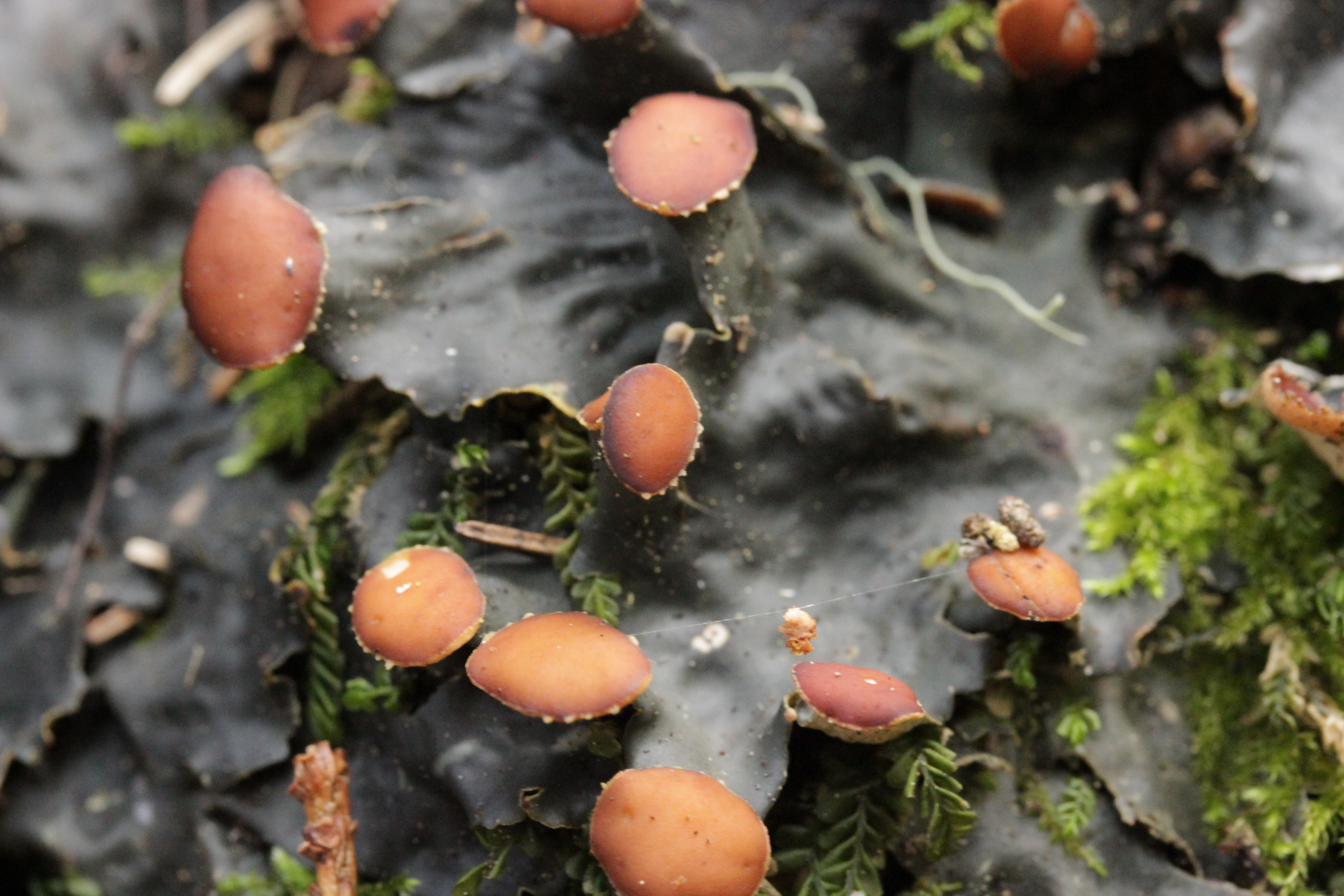

Conservation status
- Secure (NatureServe)

Scientific classification
- Kingdom: Fungi
- Division: Ascomycota
- Class: Lecanoromycetes
- Order: Peltigerales
- Family: Peltigeraceae
- Genus: Peltigera
- Species: P. horizontalis

Binomial name
- Peltigera horizontalis (Huds.) Baumg. (1790)

Synonyms
- Lichen horizontalis Huds. (1762); Peltidea horizontalis (Huds.) Ach. (1803); Peltigera canina var. horizontalis (Huds.) L.Marchand (1830); Peltigera rufescens var. horizontalis (Huds.) Spreng. (1832); Peltigera horizontalis var. muscorum Schaer. (1833); Peltigera horizontalis f. muscorum (Schaer.) Zahlbr. (1925)

= Peltigera horizontalis =

Species of lichen in the family Peltigeraceae

Peltigera horizontalis is a species of lichen in the family Peltigeraceae. It was first described by British botanist William Hudson in 1762 as Lichen horizontalis. German botanist Johann Christian Gottlob Baumgarten transferred it to the genus Peltigera in 1790.
