= Peltigera granulosa =

Scientific classification
- Domain: Eukaryota
- Kingdom: Fungi
- Division: Ascomycota
- Class: Lecanoromycetes
- Order: Peltigerales
- Family: Peltigeraceae
- Genus: Peltigera
- Species: P. granulosa

Binomial name
- Peltigera granulosa Sérus., Goffinet, Miądl. & Vitik. (2009)

Species of lichen

Peltigera granulosa is a species of terricolous (ground-dwelling), foliose lichen in the family Peltigeraceae. Found in Papua New Guinea, it was formally described as a new species in 2009 by Emmanuël Sérusiaux, Bernard Goffinet, Jolanta Miądlikowska, and Orvo Vitikainen. The type specimen was collected from open grassland between Gumum and Sape villages (Morobe Province), where it was found growing on sand. The species epithet granulosa refers to its characteristic granulose margin.

== Description ==
This lichen has a thin, fragile thallus with elongated lobes that are often erect when growing on mossy ground. The upper surface is smooth and shiny, bluish grey or brownish to dark brown, with some parts covered in a delicate white powder (pruina). The lower surface is whitish near the margins and becomes blackish towards the centre or in old specimens, with strongly raised and dark veins. Apothecia are few and only found on erect lobes, while pycnidia are marginal and black. Ascospores are acicular and straight, with rounded ends and 5–7 septa.

== Habitat and distribution ==
Peltigera granulosa is a pioneer species that primarily grows on bare ground such as sand or gravel, as well as on plant debris and peat. It can be found in both natural and artificial habitats such as road banks, and mossy soils in the montane forest zone. Although it can occur on mossy trunks within forests, it typically forms smaller and less noticeable individual lobes in these environments. Its distribution ranges from 1,300 to 3,660 m (4,270 to 12,010 ft) elevation.
