= Peltigera isidiophora =

Scientific classification
- Kingdom: Fungi
- Division: Ascomycota
- Class: Lecanoromycetes
- Order: Peltigerales
- Family: Peltigeraceae
- Genus: Peltigera
- Species: P. isidiophora

Binomial name
- Peltigera isidiophora L.F.Han & S.Y.Guo (2015)
- Holotype: Xiaowutai Mountain, Hebei, China

Species of lichen

Peltigera isidiophora is a species of foliose lichen in the family Peltigeraceae. It is characterised by its laminal clustered isidia that grow in pits, a shiny and scarred grey upper surface, and its thin, sparse, and simple rhizines. It is known only from its original collection location in Hebei, China, where it grows on moss and on soil in montane forest.

== Taxonomy ==
Peltigera isidiophora was described as a new species in 2015 by lichenologists Liu-Fu Han and Shou-Yu Guo. The type specimen of the species was collected in China, within Hebei Province on Xiaowutai Mountain. This specimen, designated as the holotype, was gathered from the ground at an elevation of 1,850 m (6,070 ft). The collection was conducted on 11 August 2013 by researchers Shou-Yu Guo, Liu-Fu Han, and Wen-Xia Liu. It is preserved in the herbarium of the Institute of Microbiology, Chinese Academy of Sciences. The species epithet isidiophora derives from the Greek isidion, meaning small granules, referring to the isidia on the lichen's surface.

== Description ==
The lichen features a foliose, thin, and fragile thallus, forming roughly circular patches about 6–10 cm (2.4–3.9 in) in diameter. The lobes are flattened, elongate, 1.0–2.8 cm wide, and can extend up to 8.0 cm (3.1 in) long, often with a dichotomous branching pattern. The upper surface is typically pale grey to dark grey, turning to blackish grey when wet, and displays a characteristic pattern of clustered isidia along its surface, particularly on damaged or older parts.

The apothecia (fruiting bodies), which are rare and develop at the tips of the lobes, have an erect, saddle-shaped form, measuring up to 4.0 mm (1/8 in) in diameter. The margins of these reproductive structures range from smooth to crenulate. The colour of the apothecial discs shifts from red-brown when wet to dark brown when dry, and they have smooth, somewhat shiny surfaces. The paraphyses are simple and septate, with a thickening at the tips. The asci are clavate (club-shaped), ranging from 45.0 to 75.0 by 6.0 to 12.0 micrometres (μm), and typically contain eight spores. These ascospores are acicular and variably septate, measuring between 30.0 and 60.0 by 2.5 to 5.0 μm. Pycnidia, an asexual reproductive structure, have not been observed to occur in this species.

== Habitat and distribution ==
Peltigera isidiophora grows on moss or soil within temperate forests dominated by species such as Betula platyphylla and Populus davidiana. At the time of its original publication, it was known only from its type locality on Xiaowutai Mountain in Hebei Province, China, at an elevation of 1850 m.

This species typically coexists with other Peltigera species and members of the genus Cladonia. It is one of 27 species of Peltigera that occur in China.
