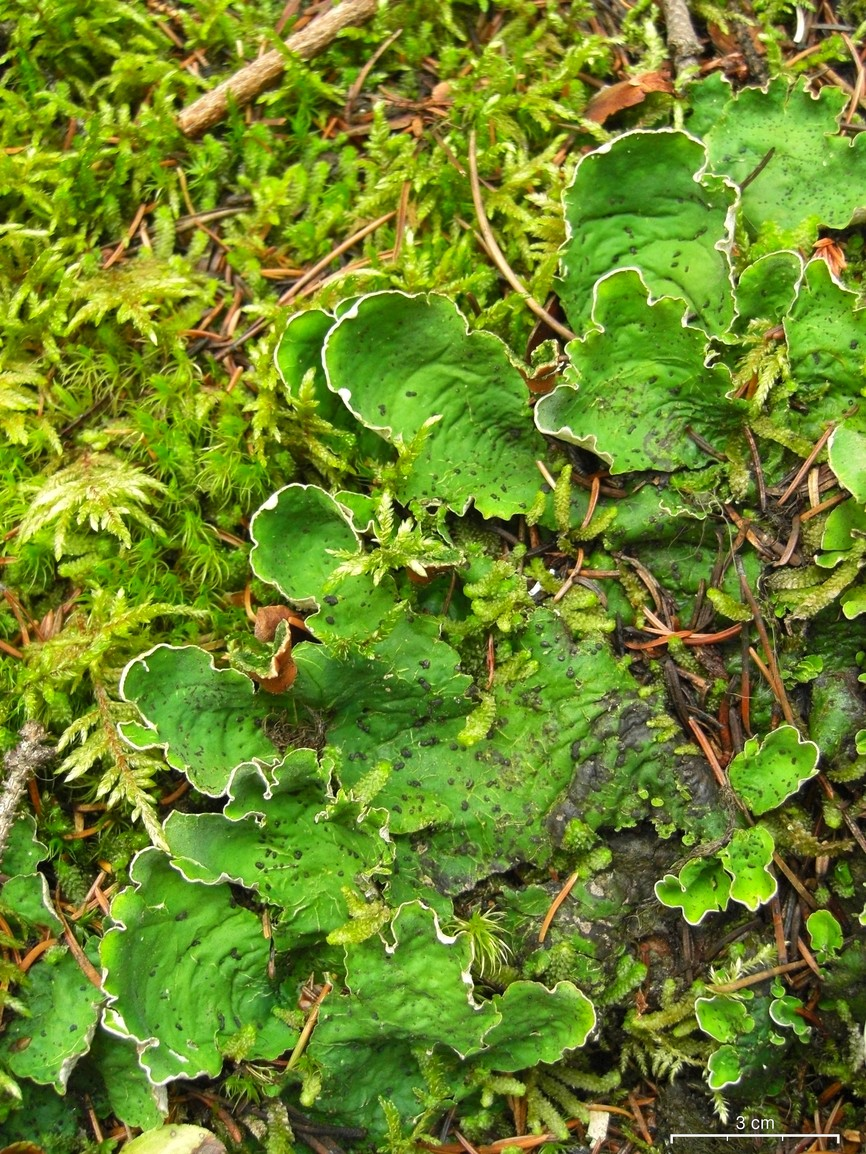

Conservation status
- Secure (NatureServe)

Scientific classification
- Kingdom: Fungi
- Division: Ascomycota
- Class: Lecanoromycetes
- Order: Peltigerales
- Family: Peltigeraceae
- Genus: Peltigera
- Species: P. britannica

Binomial name
- Peltigera britannica (Gyeln.) Holt.-Hartw. & Tønsberg (1983)

= Peltigera britannica =

Species of lichen

Peltigera britannica is a species of foliose lichen belonging to the family Peltigeraceae.

It is native to Europe and North America.
