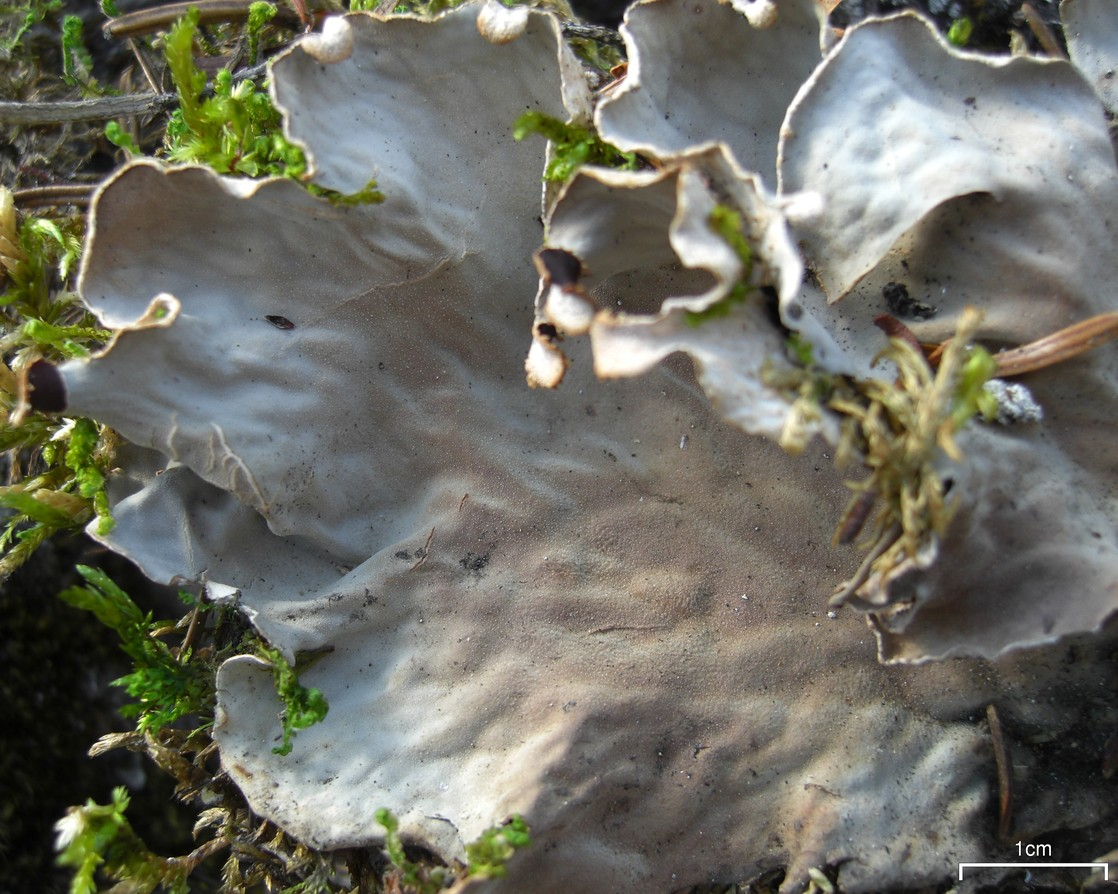

Conservation status
- Secure (NatureServe)

Scientific classification
- Kingdom: Fungi
- Division: Ascomycota
- Class: Lecanoromycetes
- Order: Peltigerales
- Family: Peltigeraceae
- Genus: Peltigera
- Species: P. scabrosa

Binomial name
- Peltigera scabrosa Th.Fr. (1861)

= Peltigera scabrosa =

Species of lichen-forming fungus

Peltigera scabrosa is a lichen which has a circumpolar distribution. Its common name is scabby pelt.

In Nepal, Peltigera scabrosa has been reported at 3,800 m elevation in a compilation of published records.

It is a known host species to the lichenicolous fungus Nectriopsis lecanodes.
