= Peltigera seneca =

Scientific classification
- Kingdom: Fungi
- Division: Ascomycota
- Class: Lecanoromycetes
- Order: Peltigerales
- Family: Peltigeraceae
- Genus: Peltigera
- Species: P. seneca

Binomial name
- Peltigera seneca Magain, Miądl. & Sérus. (2016)

Species of lichen

Peltigera seneca is a rare species of foliose lichen in the family Peltigeraceae. Native to eastern North America, it was first identified in Pennsylvania's Tioga State Forest, where it grows on humus and mossy rocks. The species has since been reported from 17 localities in South Norway, two localities in South Finland, and a locality in China, extending its known distribution to Europe and Asia. P. seneca is morphologically similar to P. polydactylon, but can be distinguished by its unique chemical profile and genetic characteristics. P. seneca is characterized by its small thalli with narrow lobes and a pale zone on margins of its lower thallus surface. It contains several secondary metabolites, including a distinctive terpenoid not found in P. polydactylon.

== Taxonomy ==
The lichen was formally described as a new species in 2016 by lichenologists Nicolas Magain, Jolanta Miądlikowska and Emmanuël Sérusiaux. The species epithet seneca honors the Seneca people, the indigenous people who once inhabited the area where the type specimen was collected in Tioga State Forest, Pennsylvania. The lichen was first scientifically collected in May 2009, at an elevation of approximately 580 m (1,900 ft).

== Description ==
Peltigera seneca forms rounded patches up to 5 cm (2 in) in diameter, with lobes measuring 1–2 cm (0.4–0.8 in) long and 0.4–0.5 cm (0.16–0.20 in) wide. On Mt. Kilimanjaro, the lobes of P. seneca specimens are larger, up to 1.5 cm (0.6 in) wide. The upper surface is smooth, shiny, and greenish-beige to brownish when dry, turning grey to dark grey when wet. The lower surface features a dense network of pale brown to white, regular elliptical interstices and slightly raised veins that become pale and less visible at the margins. The lichen contains Nostoc phylogroup V as its cyanobiont and has a secondary chemistry that includes an unidentified terpenoid; it also contains several known lichen products: tenuiorin, methyl gyrophorate, peltidactylin, dolichorhizin, and zeorin.

== Similar species ==
Peltigera seneca is morphologically identical to Peltigera polydactylon, making it a cryptic species that cannot be distinguished by physical appearance alone. Both species have thalli with similar characteristics; however, they differ in their chemical and genetic profiles. P. seneca contains a unique, unidentified terpenoid that produces a pink spot under ultraviolet light in thin-layer chromatography (TLC) solvent system C. This terpenoid is absent in P. polydactylon. Genetically, the two species can be differentiated by their DNA barcode markers. P. polydactylon has a wider distribution, being found across the Northern Hemisphere and in Australia and New Zealand, while P. seneca was originally thought to be restricted to the Appalachian Mountains in eastern North America. Recent findings, however, have extended its range to include parts of Europe and Asia.

== Habitat and distribution ==
In North America, Peltigera seneca is primarily found in the Appalachian Mountains, spanning areas in Nova Scotia, North Carolina, and Pennsylvania. Its known range was significantly expanded with a 2021 publication. In Europe, P. seneca was newly reported from 17 localities in South Norway and two localities in South Finland. This discovery was facilitated by the use of DNA barcode markers and TLC which identified a specific diagnostic terpenoid present in the species. Additionally, a sequence from China in GenBank has been recognised as belonging to P. seneca, marking its presence in Asia as well.

In 2022, the known distribution of P. seneca was further expanded with its discovery on Mount Kilimanjaro in Tanzania, representing the first report of the species from Africa. This finding significantly broadens our understanding of the species' global distribution, demonstrating a widespread but disjunct occurrence across multiple continents.

The species typically grows on mossy rocks and bryophytes in forested and cultural landscapes, particularly in the hemiboreal lowlands and boreal zones of Southeast Norway and along the hemiboreal coast of South Finland. On Mt Kilimanjaro, P. seneca inhabits high-montane forest and open habitats at elevations between 3,500–4,190 m (11,480–13,750 ft). In these environments, it grows mainly on soil with bryophytes, often sheltered by rocks or shrubs, and occasionally on rocks or decaying wood.

While initially thought to be rare, P. seneca has been found to be common in some locations. It is particularly abundant in the Erica forest zone on Mt Kilimanjaro, suggesting that the species may be more widespread than initially believed. Its perceived rarity in some regions could be due to its cryptic nature and similarity to other Peltigera species.
