= Peltigera jonii =

Scientific classification
- Kingdom: Fungi
- Division: Ascomycota
- Class: Lecanoromycetes
- Order: Peltigerales
- Family: Peltigeraceae
- Genus: Peltigera
- Species: P. jonii

Binomial name
- Peltigera jonii Timdal & Gjerlaug (2023)

Species of lichen-forming fungus

Peltigera jonii is a species of foliose lichen in the family Peltigeraceae. The lichen forms thin, delicate rosettes 8–12 cm across with lobes that have upturned margins and a hairy upper surface, typically grey to brown when dry. It grows in human-influenced habitats such as grasslands, roadsides and areas near cabins in coniferous forests of the boreal zone in Norway, though DNA evidence suggests it may also occur in Alaska.

== Taxonomy ==
Peltigera jonii was first described in 2023 by Einar Timdal and Hans Christian Gjerlaug. The type specimen was discovered in Nord-Odal, a location within the former county of Hedmark, Norway. It was specifically found about 1.7 km north of Skyrud, at an elevation of 230 m (750 ft). The species epithet jonii honours Jon Holtan-Hartwig, a researcher who has made significant contributions to the understanding of the taxonomy and chemistry of the genus Peltigera.

== Description ==
Peltigera jonii has a thallus (the main body of the lichen) that measures 8–12 cm in diameter. The thallus is generally thin and delicate, and often displays a segmented structure. The lobes comprising the thallus are typically 0.8–1.5 cm wide and 1.5–3 cm long, and their shape may vary from circular to irregular or angled. The lobe margins curve upwards, giving the thallus a slightly crispy texture. The upper surface of the lobes is covered in a thin layer of hairs (tomentum), particularly near the tips. The lichen exhibits a smooth, dull appearance, which can vary in colour from grey to brown when dry. However, it does not acquire a green hue when wet. The lichen's lower surface contrasts the upper, with narrow, raised, dark brown veins that extend almost to the margins, as well as elongated spaces in between.

Only two out of seven studied specimens presented apothecia (fruiting bodies). The apothecial discs were dark brown, measuring 5–7 mm in diameter, and were saddle-shaped on elongated lobes. The ascospores themselves are needle-shaped and divided into three segments with two septa, with measurements of 45–63 by 3–5 μm.

No trace of lichen products was revealed by thin-layer chromatography. Pycnidia, soralia, isidia, and phyllidia, all features common in other lichens, were not observed in Peltigera jonii.

== Habitat and distribution ==
The known habitat of Peltigera jonii predominantly includes areas that have been influenced by human activities, such as small grasslands, moss-covered stones, old campfires, the vicinity of a former hydroelectric power plant, roadside locations, trails, and areas near cabins in coniferous forests. These locales lie within the southern or middle boreal zone in the former Hedmark county in Norway.

After the manuscript describing Peltigera jonii was completed, further research identified a DNA sequence matching the lichen's in an uncultured fungus from a soil sample taken from a Picea mariana forest at Bonanza Creek, near Fairbanks, Alaska, USA. This discovery suggests that the lichen's distribution may extend far beyond its originally documented locations.
