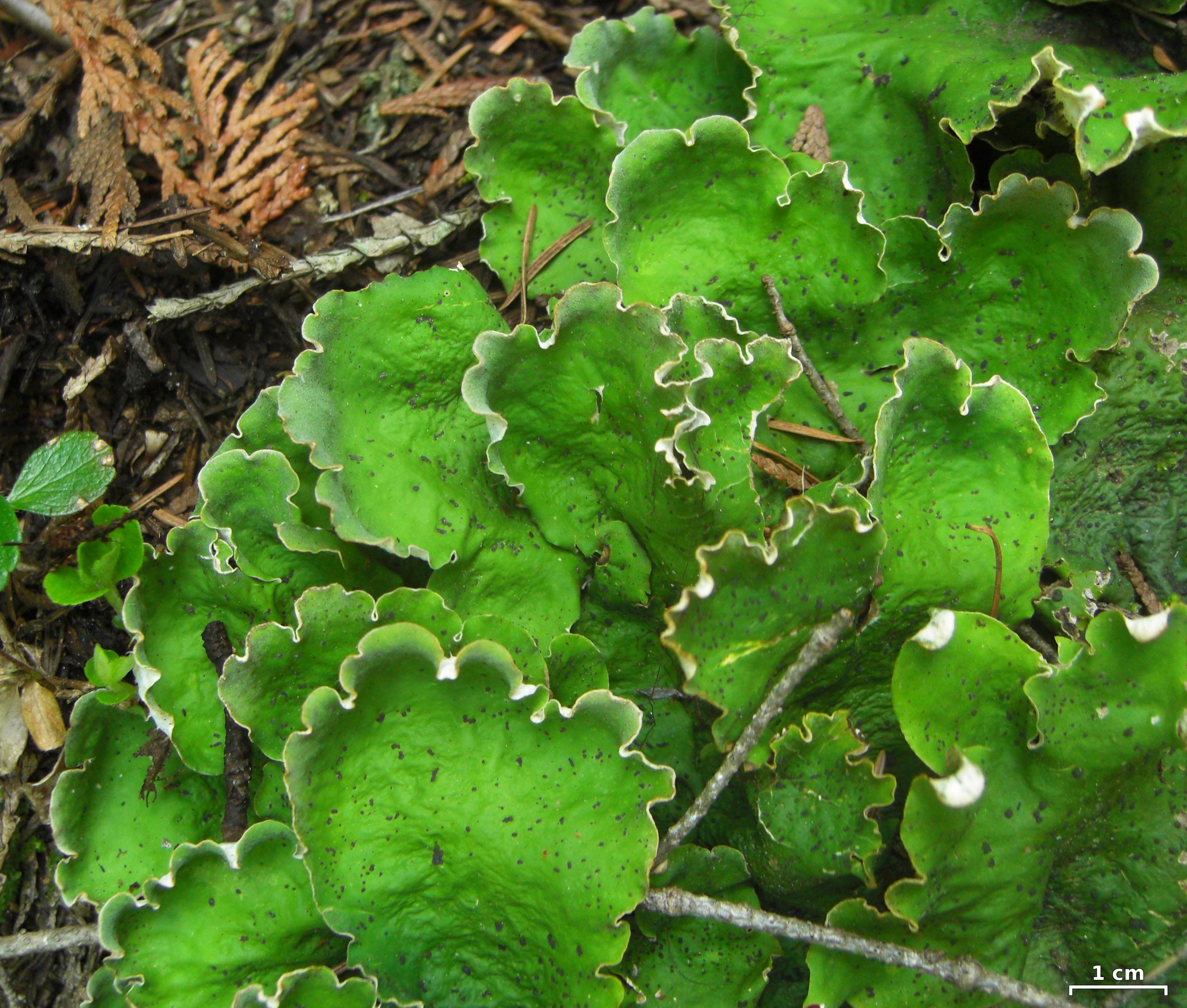

Conservation status
- Secure (NatureServe)

Scientific classification
- Kingdom: Fungi
- Division: Ascomycota
- Class: Lecanoromycetes
- Order: Peltigerales
- Family: Peltigeraceae
- Genus: Peltigera
- Species: P. chionophila

Binomial name
- Peltigera chionophila Goward & Goffinet (2000)

= Peltigera chionophila =

Species of lichen in the family Peltigeraceae

Peltigera chionophila is a species of foliose lichen in the family Peltigeraceae. It was first formally described in 2000 by Canadian lichenologist Trevor Goward and Belgian lichenologist Bernard Goffinet.
