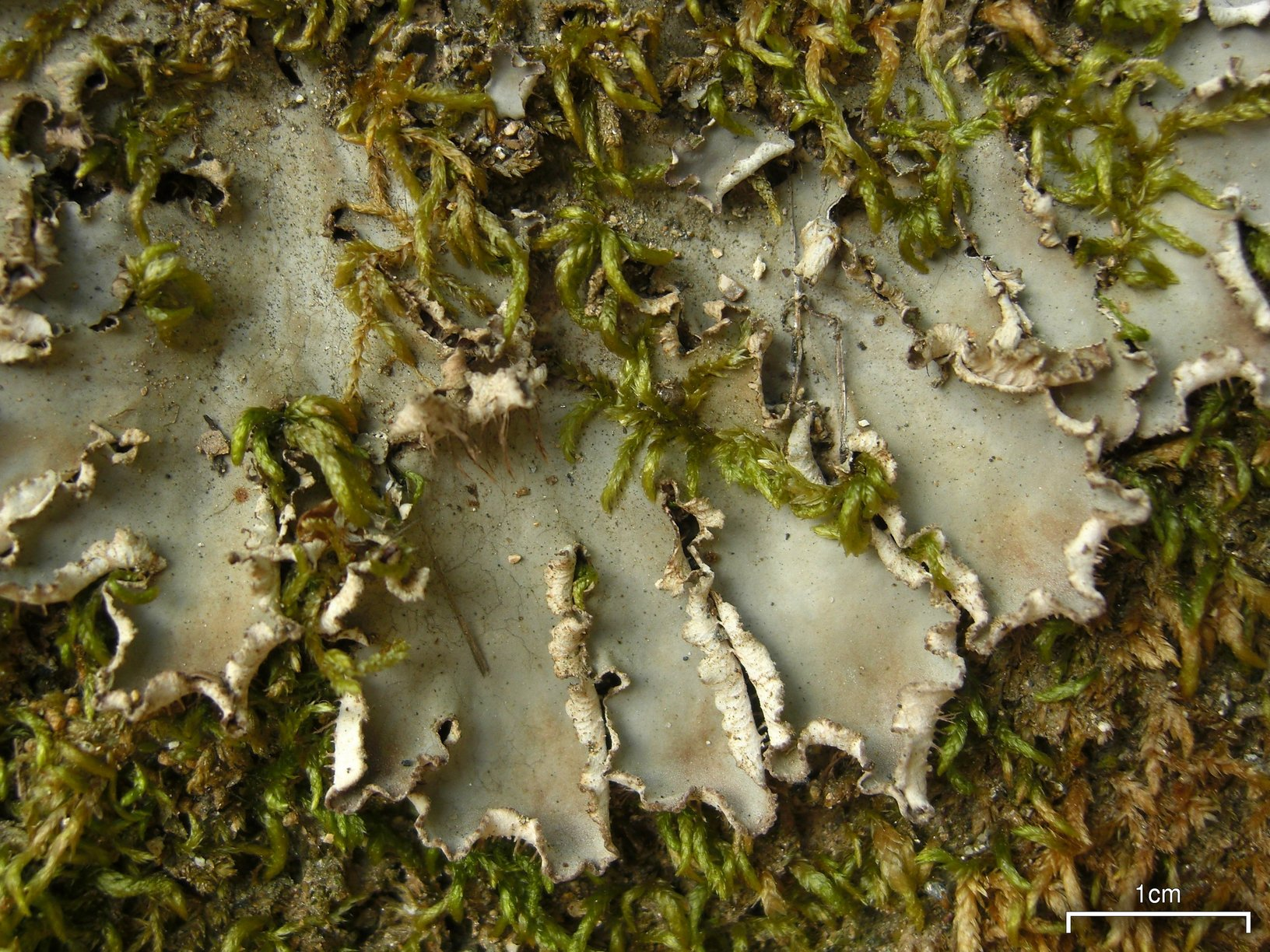

Conservation status
- Apparently Secure (NatureServe)

Scientific classification
- Kingdom: Fungi
- Division: Ascomycota
- Class: Lecanoromycetes
- Order: Peltigerales
- Family: Peltigeraceae
- Genus: Peltigera
- Species: P. degenii

Binomial name
- Peltigera degenii Gyeln. (1927)

Synonyms
- Peltigera canina f. nitens Anders (1924); Peltigera nitens (Anders) Gyeln. (1927); Peltigera praetextata var. nitens (Anders) Szatala (1942); Peltigera degenii f. nitens (Anders) Oxner (1956); Peltigera degenii var. nitens (Anders) Trass (1968)

= Peltigera degenii =

Species of lichen in the family Peltigeraceae

Peltigera degenii is a species of foliose lichen in the family Peltigeraceae. It was first formally described in 1927 by Hungarian lichenologist Vilmos Kőfaragó-Gyelnik. The Chinese species Peltigera neodegenii is similar in appearance. Peltigera degenii has a shiny upper surface. In North America, it is a relatively rare forest species.
