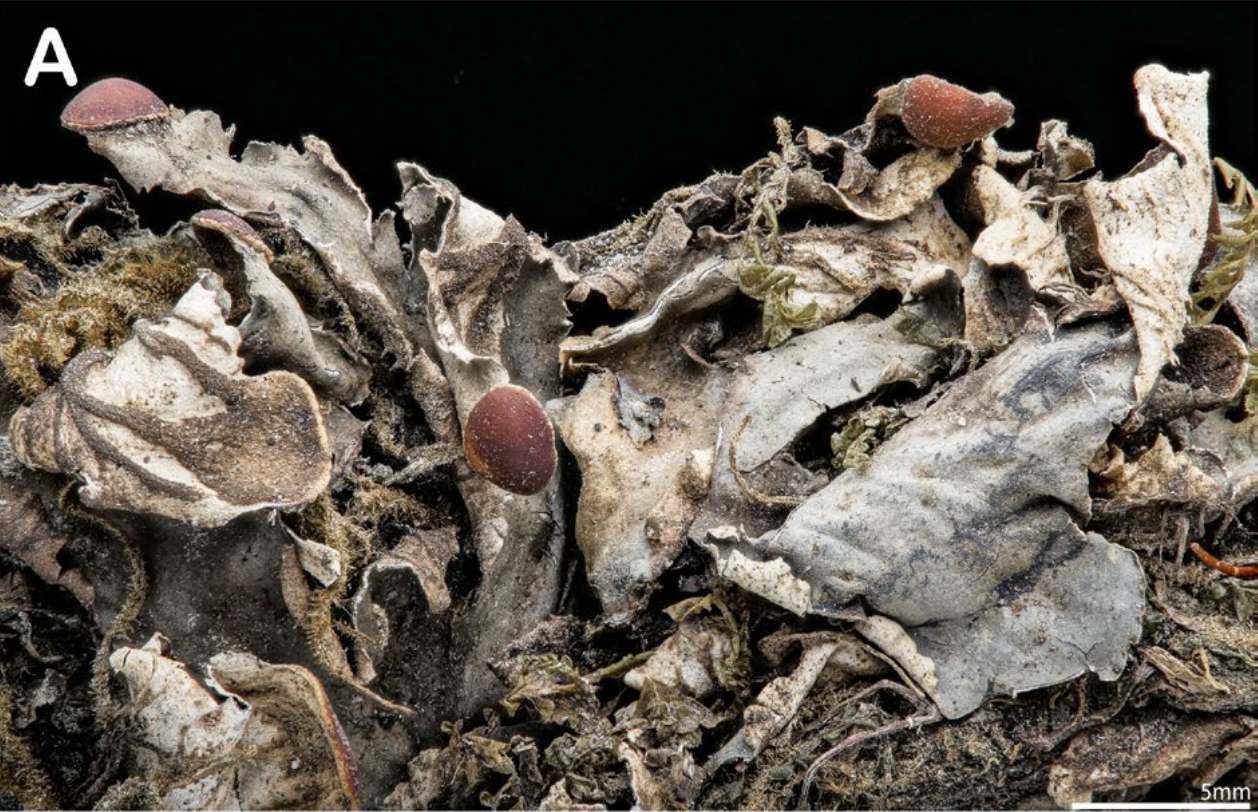
- thallus and apothecia

Scientific classification
- Kingdom: Fungi
- Division: Ascomycota
- Class: Lecanoromycetes
- Order: Peltigerales
- Family: Peltigeraceae
- Genus: Peltigera
- Species: P. hydrophila

Binomial name
- Peltigera hydrophila W.R.Buck, Miądl. & N.Magain (2020)

= Peltigera hydrophila =

Species of lichen

Peltigera hydrophila is a species of foliose lichen in the family Peltigeraceae. First described in 2020, it distinguishes itself through a distinct, hairless thallus that turns deep blue-violet when it becomes wet. Found primarily in the Magallanes Region of Chile, this small leafy lichen clings closely to mosses and other substrates. Distinctive features include the always-present reddish-brown to dark brown apothecia and the Peltigera-type ascospores that contain three internal partitions, or septa. Despite sharing a habitat with similar species like P. aubertii and P. frigida, P. hydrophila sets itself apart through its unique thallus surface texture and colour. This semi-aquatic lichen primarily thrives in humid forests, shrubby and herbaceous vegetation in southern Chile, particularly near waterfalls, streams, and other wet environments.

== Taxonomy ==
The species Peltigera hydrophila was formally described in 2020 by lichenologists William R. Buck, Jolanta Miądlikowska, and Nicolas Magain. This lichen presents a unique, hairless thallus surface that changes to a deep blue-violet colour when wet. It was given the species epithet hydrophila in reference to its affinity for water-based habitats. The type specimen was found in the Magallanes Region of Chile, where it was found in a floodplain forest dominated by species such as Nothofagus betuloides, N. antarctica, and Drimys winteri.

Peltigera hydrophila distinguishes itself from related species, including its sister species P. aubertii, by a unique internal transcribed spacer 1 hypervariable region (ITS1-HR). The close genetic relationship with P. aubertii was corroborated during a later study on the Peltigera lichen symbionts in the Andean steppes of southern Chile.

== Description ==
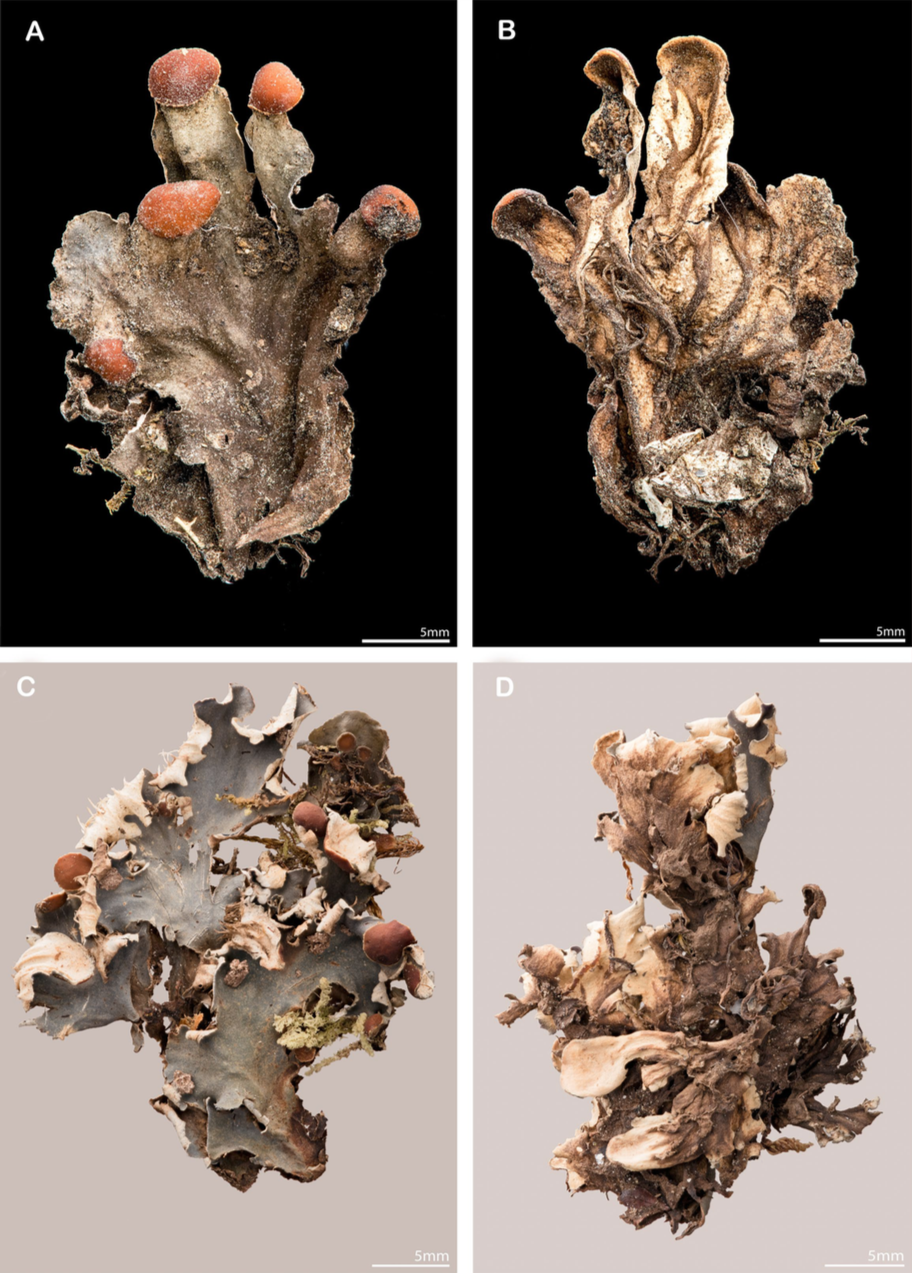
A – fertile lobes B – undersurface of the fertile lobes C – part of the thallus of the type specimen D – undersurface of the thallus of the type specimen

Peltigera hydrophila has a small foliose (leafy) thallus (up to 4 cm (1.6 in) in diameter) that is either fragile or rigid, and adheres closely to mosses and other substrates. The lobes of the thallus have distinct features, including a smooth and matte upper surface that develops a deep bluish-violet hue when wet. They are narrow, typically less than 5 mm (0.2 in) wide.

The apothecia of P. hydrophila, a defining characteristic of many lichen species, are always present and can be numerous, round or nearly round, and coloured reddish-brown to dark brown or black in some specimens. These structures develop on the marginal parts of the lobes and have a diameter of up to 4 mm. P. hydrophila also has the distinctive feature of Peltigera-type ascospores, which typically contain three septa and measure 37.5–55.0 by 3.5–6 μm.

The photobiont, or photosynthetic partner of P. hydrophila, belongs to the Nostoc phylogroup XXIII, which imparts the thallus with its deep bluish-violet colour when wet. No secondary metabolites were detected in this species using thin-layer chromatography.

== Similar species ==
Owing to its semi-aquatic lifestyle, P. hydrophila has several morphological traits in common with species from the unrelated section Hydrothyriae. Furthermore, P. hydrophila shares its habitat with P. aubertii and P. frigida, two species from the section Peltigera that also have reddish-brown, round, flat apothecia. The smooth texture of the thallus surface of P. hydrophila contrasts, however, with P. aubertii, which has a tomentose upper thallus surface, and P. frigida, which has a glossy surface. The ascospores, a key distinguishing feature among lichen species, are similar in shape and size among these three species.

== Habitat and distribution ==
Peltigera hydrophila thrives on mossy rocks in semi-aquatic environments, such as near waterfalls or along streams, or submerged, as well as in humid Nothofagus forests or shrubby and herbaceous vegetation in temperate areas of southern Chile. At the time of its original publication, this species had been found in seven collections across Chile, extending from Los Ríos Region and Los Lagos Region to the southernmost tip of Magallanes Region.
