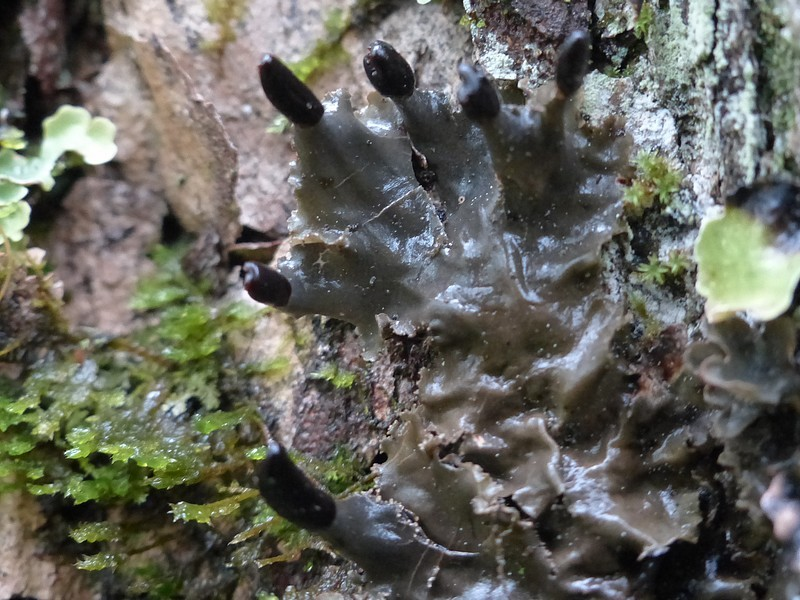
- Apothecia of Peltigera neckeri

Conservation status
- Secure (NatureServe)

Scientific classification
- Kingdom: Fungi
- Division: Ascomycota
- Class: Lecanoromycetes
- Order: Peltigerales
- Family: Peltigeraceae
- Genus: Peltigera
- Species: P. neckeri

Binomial name
- Peltigera neckeri Hepp ex Müll.Arg. (1862)

= Peltigera neckeri =

Species of lichen

Peltigera neckeri is a foliose lichen in the family Peltigeraceae. It is commonly called black saddle pelt. It is distinguished by its unique tubular apothecia, which resemble black saddles or painted finger nails.

== Ecology ==
Peltigera neckeri is found throughout temperate and boreal regions of North America, Europe, and Asia. It is terrestrial, and almost exclusively found on bare soil or mosses.
