= Peltigera wulingensis =

Scientific classification
- Kingdom: Fungi
- Division: Ascomycota
- Class: Lecanoromycetes
- Order: Peltigerales
- Family: Peltigeraceae
- Genus: Peltigera
- Species: P. wulingensis

Binomial name
- Peltigera wulingensis L.F.Han & S.Y.Guo (2013)

Species of lichen

Peltigera wulingensis is a species of terricolous (ground-dwelling), foliose lichen in the family Peltigeraceae. Originally described from specimens found in northern China, it has since been recorded in Canada, Norway, and Russia.

== Taxonomy ==
The lichen was formally described as new to science in 2013 by Liu-Fu Han and Shou-Yu Guo. The type specimen was collected from the Wuling Mountains (Hebei Province) at an altitude of 1,820 m (5,970 ft). Here it was found growing on the ground in a forest dominated by the trees Betula platyphylla, Larix principis-rupprechtii and Populus davidiana. This temperate zone locale is foggy and cloudy all year. The species epithet refers to the type locality.

== Description ==
The thallus of the lichen is frail and thin with a circular outline, and measures 5–10 cm (2.0–3.9 in) in diameter. The lobes comprising the thallus are 0.3–0.8 cm (0.12–0.31 in) wide and up to 3 cm (1.2 in) long. The colour of the thallus ranges from pale grey to dark grey or greyish brown when it is dry, but it darkens to blackish green when it is wet. The thallus surface is scabrose–having rough, having fine scales or delicate and irregular projections. The medulla is white. Wart-like to scale-like phyllidia are present, and they measure 0.3–1.5 mm wide. There are abundant simple rhizines (rarely branched) on the thallus undersurface; they are white to dark grey to brown. There are no apothecia, and pycnidia are rare. The lichen products detected in this species were two unidentified triterpenes.

Another Chinese species, Peltigera shennongjiana, is somewhat similar in appearance. It can be distinguished from P. wulingensis by the lack of scabrosity in its upper surface, the presence of pruina on the thallus, and its long and bushy rhizines.

== Habitat and distribution ==
Originally described from specimens found in northern China, Peltigera wulingensis has since been recorded in Canada (Ontario and Quebec), three locations in Norway, and the Krasnoyarsk Krai region of Russia.
