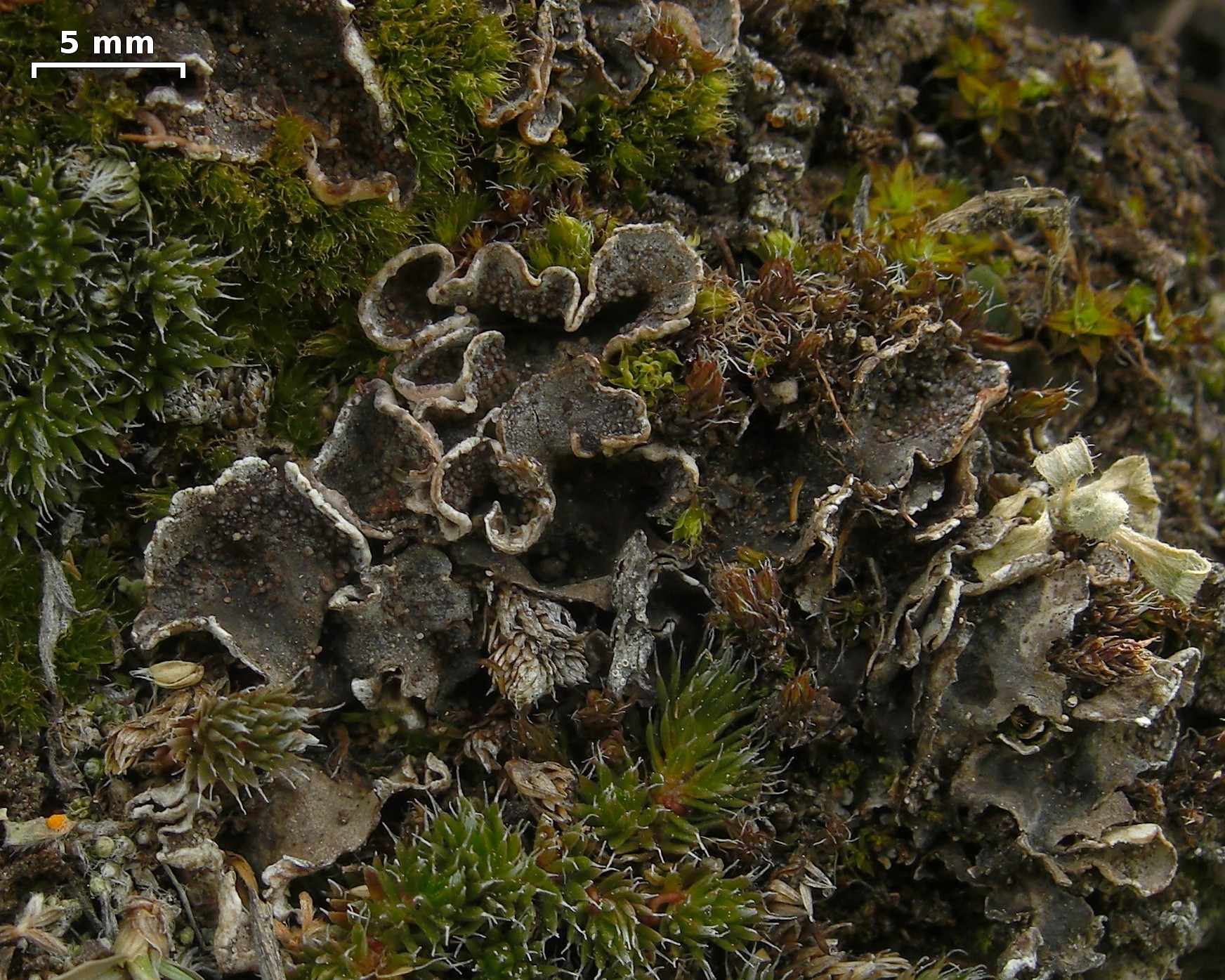

Scientific classification
- Kingdom: Fungi
- Division: Ascomycota
- Class: Lecanoromycetes
- Order: Peltigerales
- Family: Peltigeraceae
- Genus: Peltigera
- Species: P. lepidophora

Binomial name
- Peltigera lepidophora (Vain.) Bitter (1904)

Synonyms
- Peltigera canina var. lepidophora Vain. (1878); Peltigera canina subsp. lepidophora (Vain.) Vain. (1881)

= Peltigera lepidophora =

Species of lichen in the family Peltigeraceae

Peltigera lepidophora, commonly known as the scaly pelt, is a species of foliose lichen in the family Peltigeraceae. It was first described by Finnish lichenologist Edvard August Vainio in 1878 as a variety of Peltigera canina. German botanist Friedrich August Georg Bitter promoted it to species status in 1904.

The lichen has a pale to dark brown thallus comprising rounded and concave lobes that measure 5–10 mm (0.2–0.4 in) across. The upper surface is covered with isidia, while the lower surface has pale, indistinct veins and unbranched rhizines. It grows on exposed soil, such as roadsides or trailbanks.
