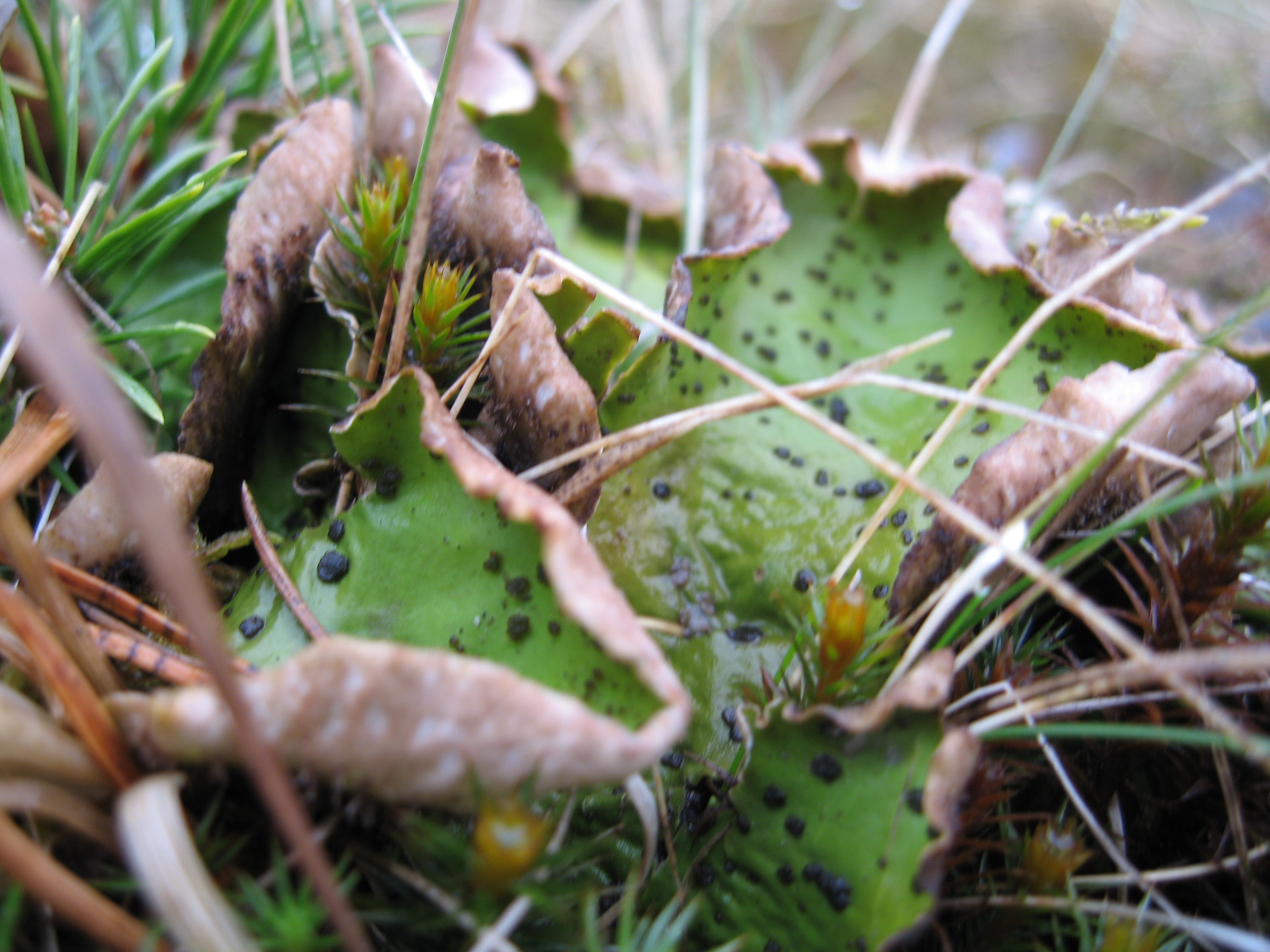

Conservation status
- Secure (NatureServe)

Scientific classification
- Kingdom: Fungi
- Division: Ascomycota
- Class: Lecanoromycetes
- Order: Peltigerales
- Family: Peltigeraceae
- Genus: Peltigera
- Species: P. aphthosa

Binomial name
- Peltigera aphthosa (L.) Willd. (1787)

Synonyms
- Lichen aphthosus L. (1753)

= Peltigera aphthosa =

Species of lichenised fungus in the family Peltigeraceae

Peltigera aphthosa is a species of lichen known by the common names green dog lichen, leafy lichen, felt lichen, and common freckle pelt. It has a circumpolar distribution, occurring throughout the Arctic, boreal, and temperate regions of the Northern Hemisphere.

This lichen has a large thallus that may exceed one meter in width. It is divided into lobes up to about 10 centimeters long and 6 wide. It is green, becoming pale as it dries. The thallus is dotted with cephalodia, which contains one of the two symbionts, a species of Nostoc. The other is a species of Coccomyxa. These perform photosynthesis, and the Nostoc also fixes nitrogen. The lichen produces large apothecia, a reproductive structure.

This widespread lichen grows in a variety of habitat types, including Arctic ecosystems. It grows in alpine climates in the southern parts of its distribution.

This lichen was noted to absorb aluminum and silicon from the ash released from the 1980 eruption of Mount St. Helens.

It is a known host to the lichenicolous fungus species Lichenopeltella santessonii.

== See also ==
- List of lichens named by Carl Linnaeus
