= Peltigera shennongjiana =

Scientific classification
- Domain: Eukaryota
- Kingdom: Fungi
- Division: Ascomycota
- Class: Lecanoromycetes
- Order: Peltigerales
- Family: Peltigeraceae
- Genus: Peltigera
- Species: P. shennongjiana

Binomial name
- Peltigera shennongjiana Han & Guo (2019)

Species of lichen

Peltigera shennongjiana is a species of terricolous (ground-dwelling), foliose lichen in the family Peltigeraceae. Found in Central China, it was formally described as a new species in 2019 by Liu-Fu Han and Shou-Yu Guo. The type specimen was collected from Laojunshan Mountain in the Shennongjia Forestry District (Hubei Province) at an elevation of 900 m (3,000 ft); here it was found growing on mosses over rocks and soil. The species epithet refers to the type locality.

== Description ==
Peltigera shennongjiana is a member of the Peltigera canina species group, but is distinguished from these similar lichens by presence of abundant isidia, phyllidia, and flat, branched lobules positioned along the margin or along cracks in the lamina. It has a greyish, circular thallus measuring up to 15 cm (6 in) in diameter. The lobes that comprise the thallus are 0.6–1.0 cm (0.2–0.4 in) wide and 2.5 cm (1.0 in) long. The apothecia are oriented vertically, and have red-brown to dark brown apothecial discs. Its ascospores have between three and six septa, and measure 32.0–58.0 by 2.0–6.0 μm. The photobiont partner is a cyanobacteria from the genus Nostoc. The only lichen product detected was an unidentified triterpenoid.
