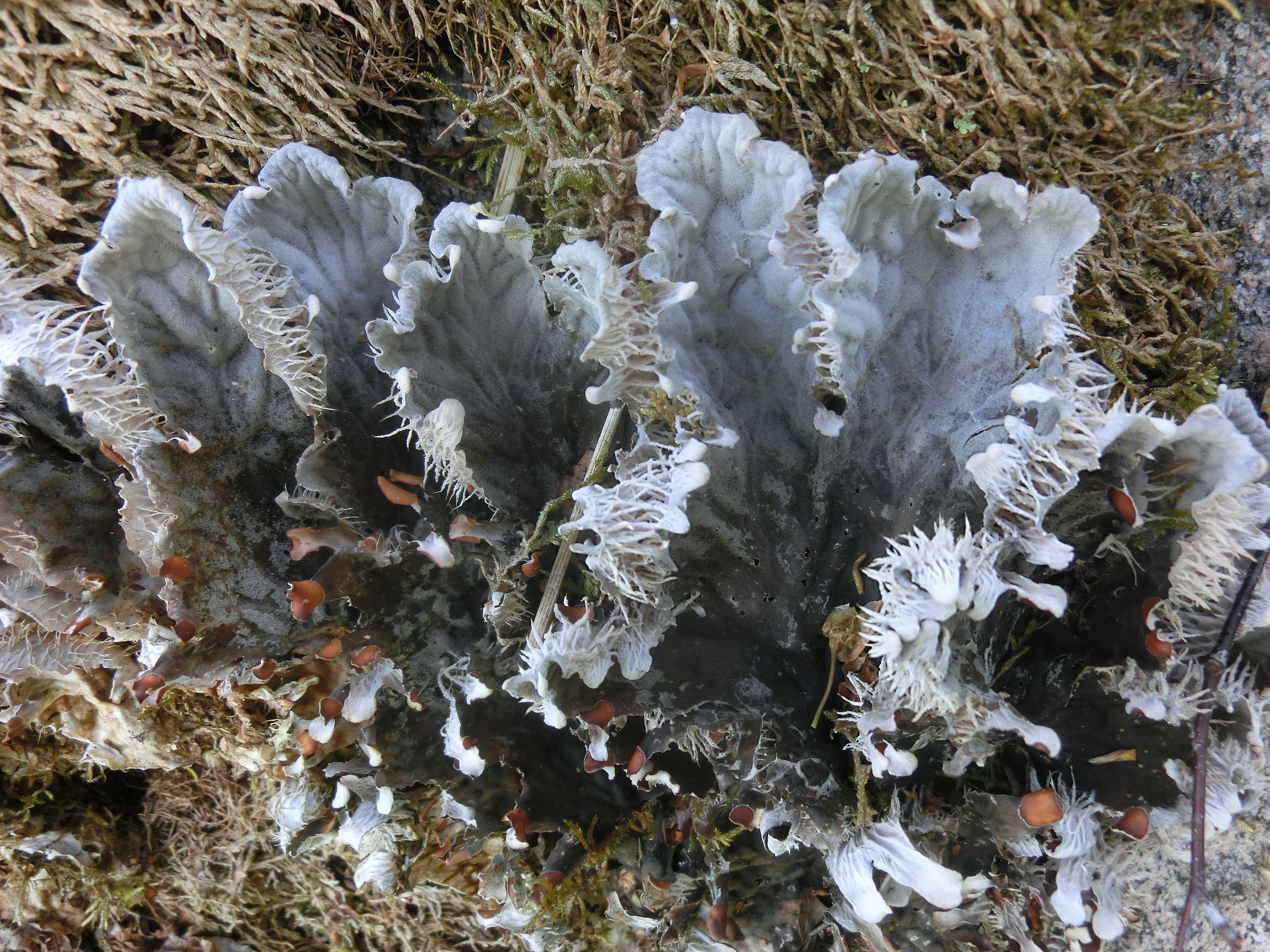
- Peltigera canina

Scientific classification
- Kingdom: Fungi
- Division: Ascomycota
- Class: Lecanoromycetes
- Order: Peltigerales
- Family: Peltigeraceae
- Genus: Peltigera; Willd. (1787)

Type species
- Peltigera canina (L.) Willd. (1787)

Synonyms
- List: Antilyssa Haller ex M.Choisy (1929); Byrsalis Neck. ex Kremp. (1869); Chloropeltigera (Gyeln.) Gyeln. (1934); Chloropeltis Clem. (1909); Hydrothyria J.L.Russell (1856); Peltidea Ach. (1803); Peltideomyces E.A.Thomas (1939); Peltigera sect. Chloropeltigera Gyeln. (1932); Peltigeromyces E.A.Thomas ex Cif. & Tomas. (1953); Peltophora Clem. (1909); Placodion P.Browne ex Adans. (1763)

= Peltigera =

Genus of lichen-forming fungi

Peltigera is a genus of approximately 100 species of foliose lichens in the family Peltigeraceae. Commonly known as the dog or pelt lichens, species of Peltigera are often terricolous (growing on soil), but can also occur on moss, trees, rocks, and many other substrates in many parts of the world.

Most species of Peltigera have the cyanobacterium Nostoc as the dominant photobiont but some have the algae Coccomyxa. The presence of both a green alga and a cyanobacterium makes some tripartite; in this case they show cephalodium growths containing the third partner, Nostoc. Because of their ability to fix nitrogen from the atmosphere, such lichens are influential in soil composition and generation.

== Description ==
Species of Peltigera are foliose, with broad lobed thalli. Although the size of the thalli is variable and species-dependent, in some species the thalli can grow quite large, up to 30 cm in diameter. The color of the upper surface may range from drab gray, brown or greenish. Lower surfaces are typically without a cortex (unlike other foliose lichens), and cottony, often with fungal hyphae fused to form a network of veins. The reproductive structures isidia, soredia or lobules may be present in some species. All species of Peltigera associate with the nitrogen-fixing cyanobacteria Nostoc.

Peltigera can be distinguished from the equally large and leaf-like lichen, Nephroma, by its veined lower cortex; Nephroma, by contrast, has a smooth, unveined lower cortex.

=== Habitat ===
Peltigera are mainly ground-dwelling, but can also be found on mosses or dead wood. Some species are used as forest succession indicators.

== Taxonomy ==
In 1753, Carl Linnaeus first described the species Lichen apthosus and L. caninus back when all known lichens were grouped into the genus Lichen. Later, in 1787, Carl Ludwig Willdenow circumscribed the genus Peltigera, and redescribed P. aphthosa and P. canina.

The generic name is derived from the Latin language pelta (small shield), and refers to the shield-shaped thallus in these species. The common name, the dog lichen, refers to the perceived resemblance of P. caninus to a dog.

=== Phylogeny ===
In a comparative analysis of both morphological and chemical characteristics as well as sequences of large subunit nuclear ribosomal DNA, it was shown that the genus Peltigera is monophyletic. Several species, such as P. canina, have been changed to a group as there appears to be several species clustered under a single name.

Recent taxonomic work has led to the consolidation of three previously recognized aquatic Peltigera species (P. hydrothyria, P. gowardii, and P. aquatica) into a single species with three varieties. According to Bruce McCune and Daphne Stone (2022), while molecular analysis showed three distinct genetic clades, maintaining them as separate species proved impractical for conservation and research purposes. This was because P. gowardii and P. aquatica, which occur together in western North America, are indistinguishable without DNA sequencing. The difficulty in identifying specimens to species level effectively stalled data collection, with most specimens remaining classified only as P. hydrothyria sensu lato. To resolve this issue while preserving information about genetic diversity, the three taxa were reclassified as P. hydrothyria var. hydrothyria (eastern North America), P. hydrothyria var. gowardii (western), and P. hydrothyria var. aquatica (western). This taxonomic solution allows for practical field identification while still acknowledging the genetic differences between populations.

== Distribution ==
The Peltigera have a widespread distribution, and are found on all continents. There are 34 North American species, 30 European species, 25 species from South America, and 16 species from New Zealand. There are 27 Peltigera species that have been recorded from China.

== Ecology ==
Peltigera lichens host diverse microbial communities, functioning as miniature ecosystems rather than simple dual partnerships. A cross-continental metabarcoding study found that geography, rather than host identity, explained more of the variation in the fungal community within the thallus (the mycobiome); Peltigera also showed a "nested" pattern, with many thalli sharing a common subset of resident fungi. The assemblage was mostly Ascomycota (e.g., Dothideomycetes such as Capnodiales) with a consistent Basidiomycota component, and a small recurring core that included the basidiomycete yeast Cutaneotrichosporon debeurmannianum alongside Dothideomycete and Chaetothyriomycete lineages. Consistent with this, other work shows that Peltigera species harbour rich communities of basidiomycete yeasts; for example, P. rufescens has yielded over 90 yeast isolates representing 18 taxa, and soils appear to act as local reservoirs from which these symbionts are acquired.

The yeasts associated with Peltigera belong to several major taxonomic groups, including members of the classes Tremellomycetes, Cystobasidiomycetes, and other basidiomycetes. Many of these yeasts are psychrotolerant, showing adaptations to cold environments, which may enhance the lichens' ability to survive in harsh conditions. This characteristic likely contributes to the successful colonisation of various habitats by Peltigera species, particularly in temperate and cold regions where they are commonly found. Studies have shown that these yeasts can maintain metabolic activity even at low temperatures, potentially supporting the lichen's overall survival and ecological functionality.

The relationship between Peltigera and its microbial communities appears to vary across different environments and species. Research in southern Chile has demonstrated that Peltigera lichens can enhance gamma diversity across landscapes by functioning as island-like habitats that support specialised bacteria and yeasts. This suggests that Peltigera species play a broader ecological role beyond their own survival, contributing to local microbial biodiversity patterns and ecosystem processes. While the specific functions of many associated microorganisms remain under investigation, this complex microbial diversity likely contributes to the ecological resilience of Peltigera species across different environments and may help explain their successful colonisation of diverse habitats worldwide.

== Species ==
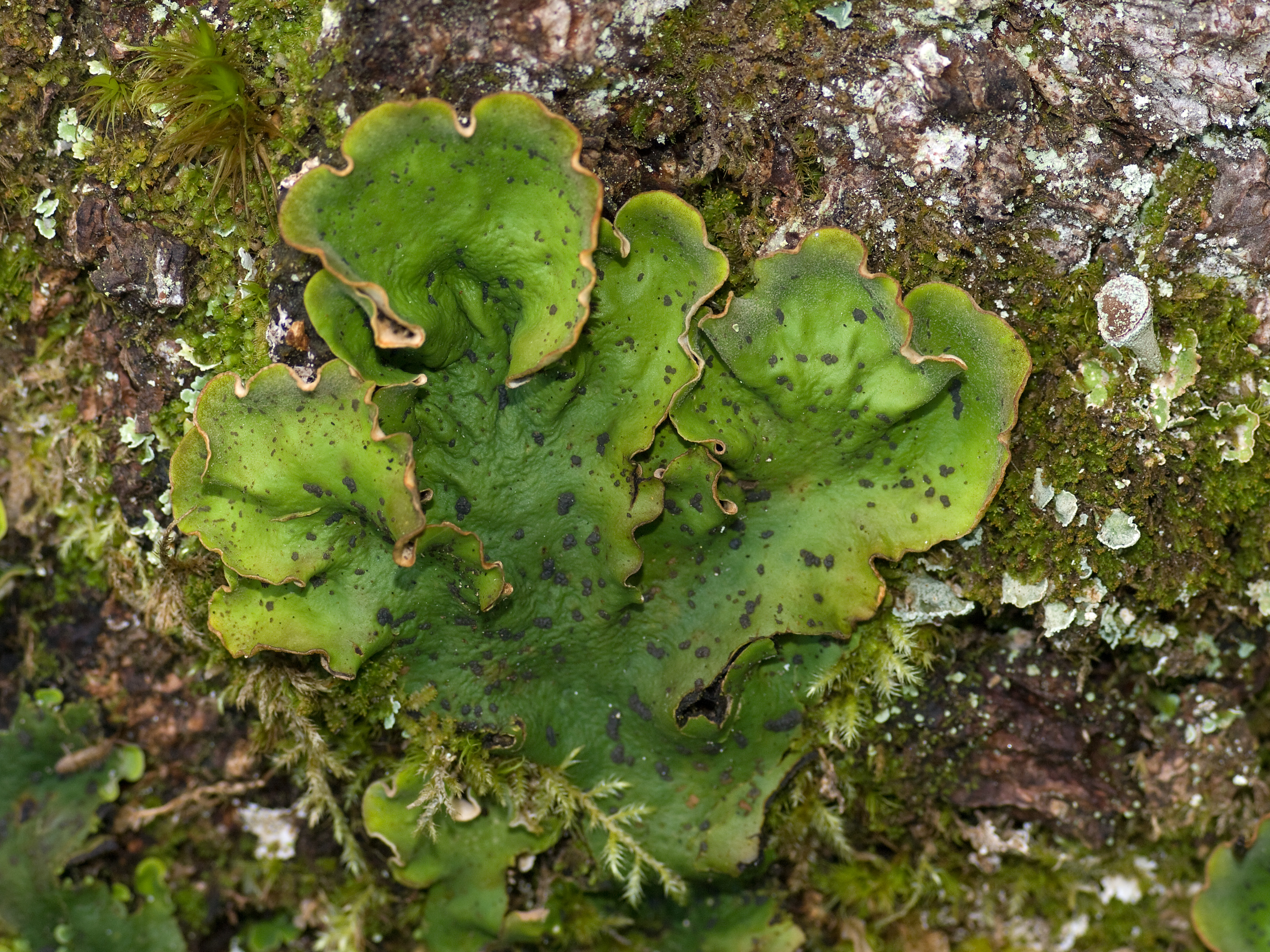
Peltigera aphthosa

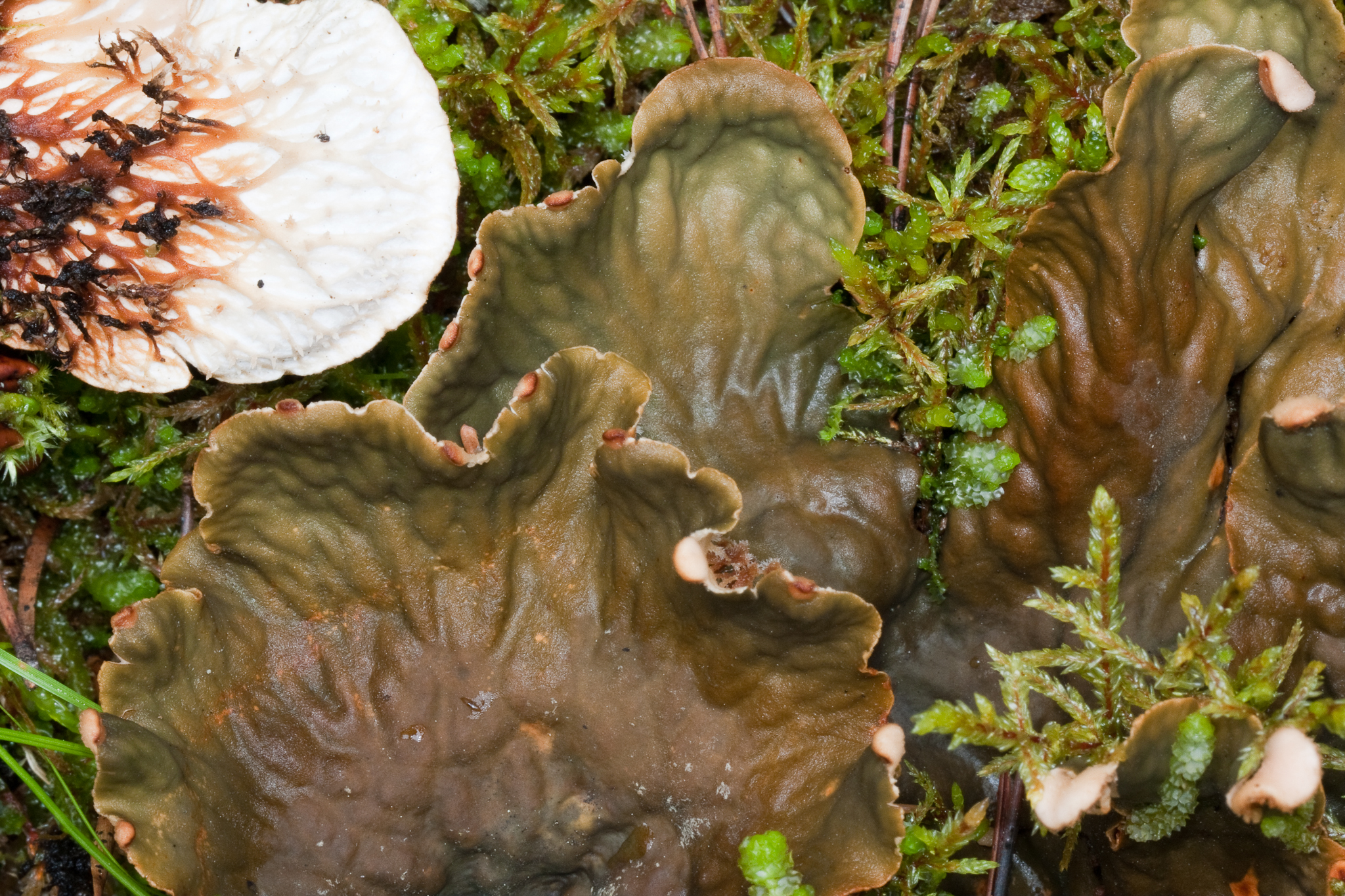
Peltigera cinnamomea

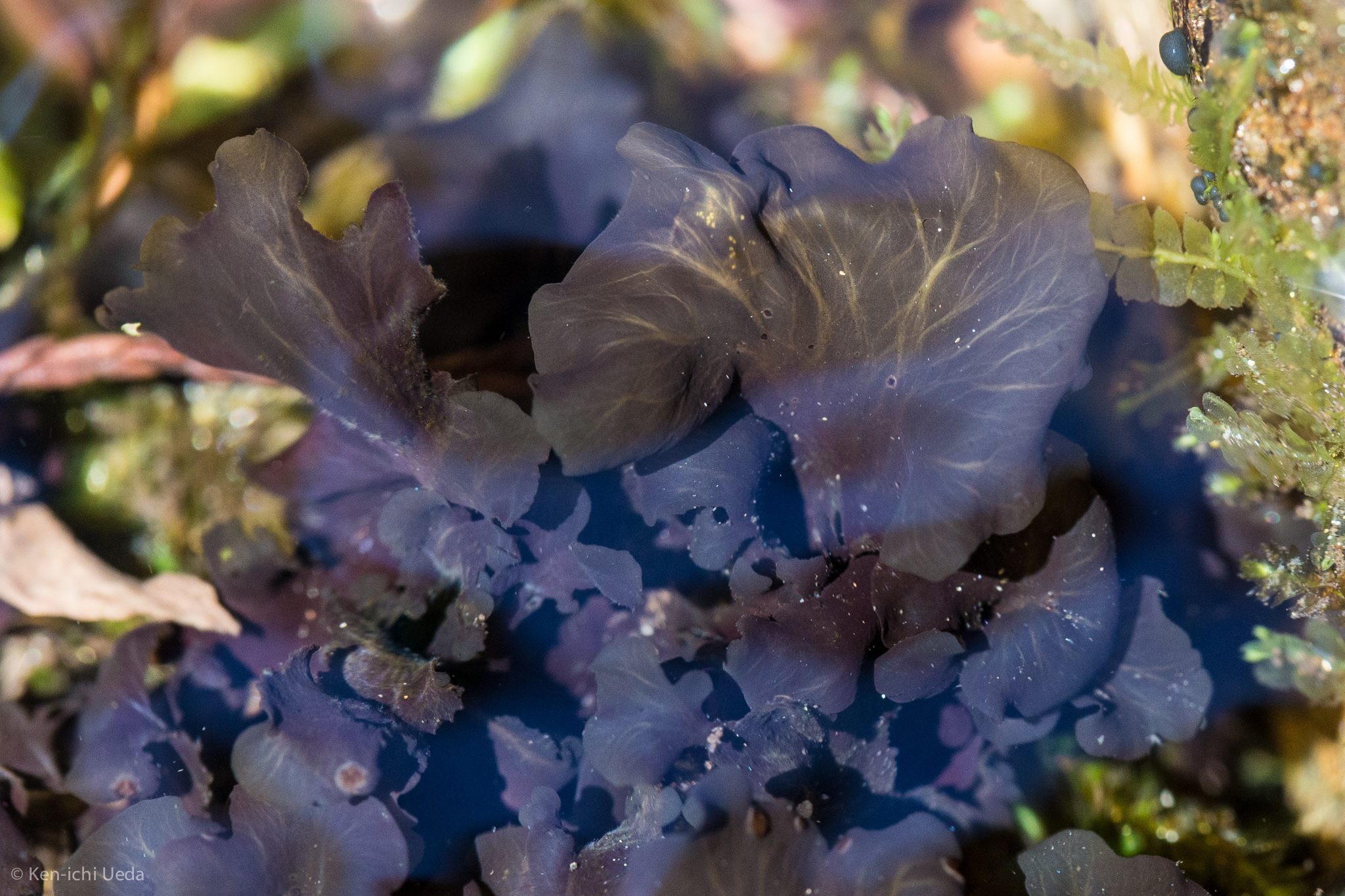
Peltigera hydrothyria var. gowardii

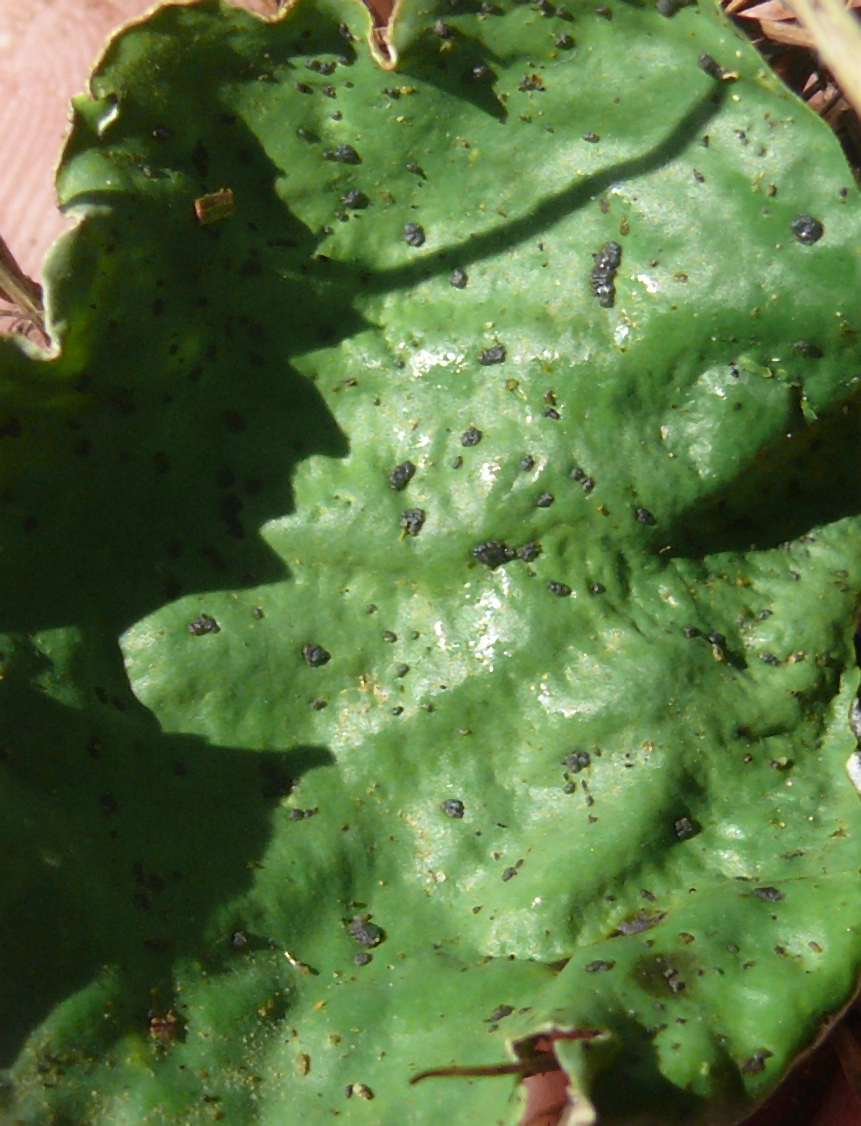
Peltigera leucophlebia

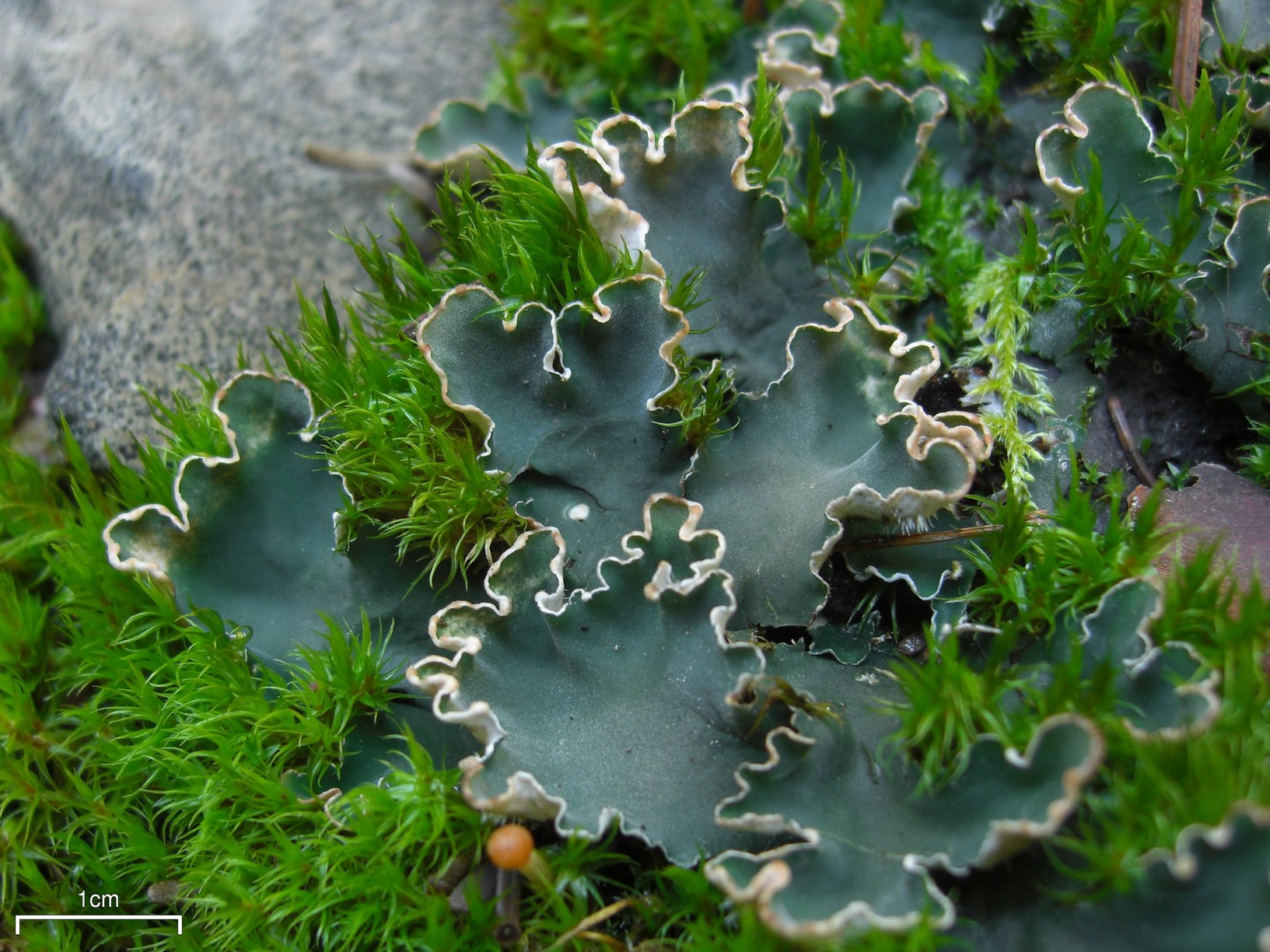
Peltigera malacea

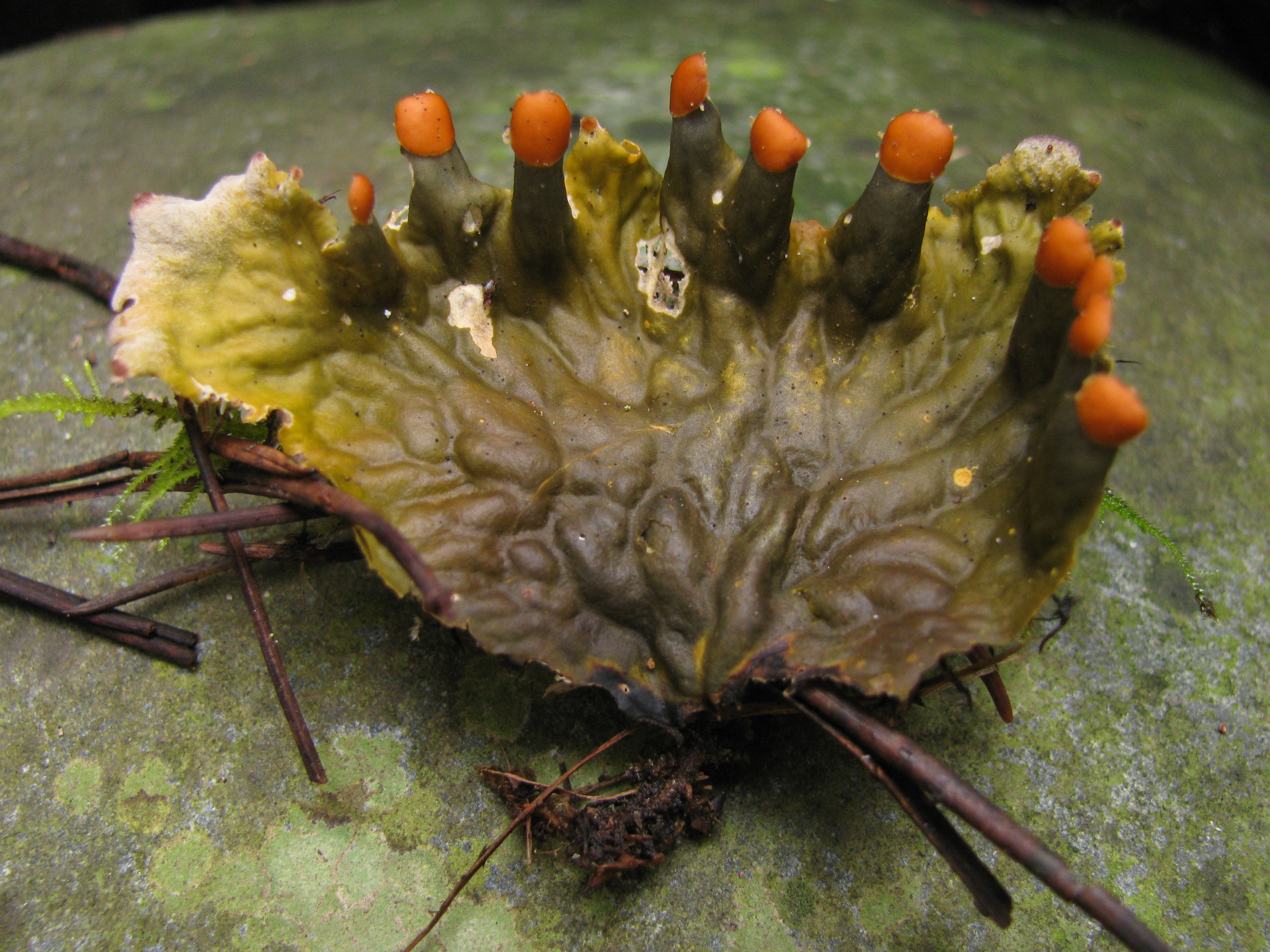
Peltigera membranacea

- Peltigera alkalicola Kaasalainen (2022) – Tanzania
- Peltigera aphthosa (L.) Willd. (1787)
- Peltigera appalachiensis Magain, Miadl. & Sérus. (2023)
- Peltigera asiatica Magain, Goffinet, Miadl. & Sérus. (2023)
- Peltigera borealis Magain, Miadl. & Sérus. (2023)
- Peltigera borinquensis Magain, Merc.-Díaz, Miadl. & Sérus. (2023)
- Peltigera britannica (Gyeln.) Holt.-Hartw. & Tønsberg (1983)
- Peltigera canina (L.) Willd. (1787)
- Peltigera castanea Goward, Goffinet & Miądl. (2003)
- Peltigera chabanenkoae Magain, Miadl. & Sérus. (2023)
- Peltigera chionophila Goward & Goffinet (2000) – North America
- Peltigera cinnamomea Goward (1995) – northwestern North America
- Peltigera clathrata Magain, Goward, Miadl. & Sérus. (2023)
- Peltigera collina (Ach.) Schrad. (1801)
- Peltigera degenii Gyeln. (1927)
- Peltigera didactyla (With.) J.R.Laundon (1984)
- Peltigera dilacerata (Gyeln.) Gyeln. (1932)
- Peltigera dolichorhiza (Nyl.) Nyl. (1888)
- Peltigera elisabethae Gyeln. (1927)
- Peltigera elixii Magain, Goffinet, Miadl. & Sérus. (2023)
- Peltigera esslingeri Magain, Miadl. & Sérus. (2023)
- Peltigera evansiana Gyeln. (1931)
- Peltigera extenuata (Nyl. ex Vain.) Lojka (1886)
- Peltigera fibrilloides (Gyeln.) Vitik. (1998)
- Peltigera fimbriata Vitik., Sérus., Goffinet & Miądl. (2009) – Papua New Guinea
- Peltigera flabellae Magain, Goward, Miadl. & Sérus. (2023)
- Peltigera frigida R.Sant. (1944)
- Peltigera frippii Holt.-Hartw. (1988) – Norway
- Peltigera gallowayi Magain, Miadl. & Sérus. (2023)
- Peltigera globulata Miądl. & Magain (2023)
- Peltigera granulosa Sérus., Goffinet, Miądl. & Vitik. (2009) – Papua New Guinea
- Peltigera hawaiiensis Vitik., Magain, Miadl., & Sérus. (2023)
- Peltigera hokkaidoensis Magain, Miadl. & Sérus. (2023)
- Peltigera holtanhartwigii Magain, Miadl. & Sérus. (2023)
- Peltigera horizontalis (Huds.) Baumg. (1790)
- Peltigera hydrophila W.R.Buck, J.Miadlikowska & N.Magain (2020) – Chile
- Peltigera hydrothyria Miądl. & Lutzoni (2000)
- Peltigera hymenina (Ach.) Delise (1830)
- Peltigera isidiophora L.F.Han & S.Y.Guo (2015) – China
- Peltigera islandica T.Goward & S.S.Manoharan-Basil (2016) – Iceland
- Peltigera itatiaiae Magain, Miądl. & Sérus. (2023)
- Peltigera jonii Timdal & Gjerlaug (2023) – Europe
- Peltigera koponenii Sérus., Goffinet, Miądl. & Vitik. (2009) – Papua New Guinea
- Peltigera kristinssonii Vitik. (1985) – Iceland
- Peltigera kukwae Magain, Miadl. & Sérus. (2023)
- Peltigera lactucifolia (With.) J.R.Laundon (1984)
- Peltigera lairdii C.W.Dodge & E.D.Rudolph (1955) – Antarctica
- Peltigera latiloba Holt.-Hartw. (2005) – Alaska (USA); Norway
- Peltigera lepidophora (Vain.) Bitter (1904)
- Peltigera leptoderma Nyl. (1860)
- Peltigera leucophlebia (Nyl.) Gyeln. (1926)
- Peltigera malacea (Ach.) Funck (1827)
- Peltigera massonii Magain, Miadl. & Sérus. (2023)
- Peltigera melanorrhiza Purvis, P.James & Vitik. (1993)
- Peltigera membranacea (Ach.) Nyl. (1887)
- Peltigera mikado Magain, Goffinet, Miadl. & Sérus. (2023)
- Peltigera montis-wilhelmii Sérus., Goffinet, Miądl. & Vitik. (2009) – Papua New Guinea
- Peltigera neckeri Hepp ex Müll.Arg. (1862)
- Peltigera neodegenii L.F.Han, S.Y.Guo & X.M.Xu (2018) – China
- Peltigera neopolydactyla (Gyeln.) Gyeln. (1932)
- Peltigera neorufescens Goward & Manoharan-Basil (2016)
- Peltigera nigriventris Magain, Goward, Miadl. & Sérus. (2023)
- Peltigera occidentalis (E.Dahl) Kristinsson (1968)
- Peltigera orientalis Magain, Jüriado, Miadl. & Sérus. (2023)
- Peltigera pacifica Vitik. (1985) – Canada
- Peltigera papuana Sérus., Goffinet, Miądl. & Vitik. (2009) – Papua New Guinea
- Peltigera phyllidiosa Goffinet & Miądl. (1999)
- Peltigera polydactylon (Neck.) Hoffm. (1789)
- Peltigera ponojensis Gyeln. (1931)
- Peltigera praetextata (Flörke ex Sommerf.) Zopf (1909)
- Peltigera pulverulenta (Taylor) Nyl. (1860)
- Peltigera pusilla (Fr.) Körb. (1855)
- Peltigera rangiferina Magain, Miadl. & Sérus. (2023)
- Peltigera retifoveata Vitik. (1985) – Finland
- Peltigera rufescens (Weiss) Humb. (1793)
- Peltigera rufescentiformis (Gyeln.) C.W.Dodge (1964)
- Peltigera scabrosa Th.Fr. (1860)
- Peltigera scabrosella Holt.-Hartw. (1988) – Norway
- Peltigera seneca Magain, Miądl. & Sérus. (2016)
- Peltigera serusiauxii Magain, Miadl., Goffinet & Ant. Simon (2020)
- Peltigera shennongjiana Han & Guo (2016) – China
- Peltigera sipmanii Magain, Miadl. & Sérus. (2023)
- Peltigera sorediifera (Nyl.) Vitik. (2008)
- Peltigera stanleyensis Magain, Goffinet, Miadl. & Sérus. (2023)
- Peltigera subhorizontalis Gyeln. (1932)
- Peltigera tartarea (Llano) Vitik. (2006)
- Peltigera tereziana Gyeln. (1928)
- Peltigera ulcerata Müll.Arg. (1880)
- Peltigera vainioi Gyeln. (1928)
- Peltigera venosa (L.) Hoffm. (1789)
- Peltigera vitikainenii Magain, Miadl., Goward & Sérus. (2023)
- Peltigera weberi Sérus., Goffinet, Miądl. & Vitik. (2009) – Papua New Guinea
- Peltigera willdenowii Magain, Miadl. & Sérus. (2023)
- Peltigera wulingensis L.F.Han & S.Y.Guo (2013) – Canada; China; Norway; Russia

== Uses ==
Peltigera species have been used historically to treat wounds, urinary disorders, thrush, tuberculosis, and rabies. P. apthosa was used as a remedy for cough and infantile aphthae. P. furfuracea has shown potent antioxidant activity and reducing power. Similarly, Peltigera specimens from Hawaii and Iceland have also been reported to show pronounced antioxidant activity.

=== Food source ===
Although a few reports have described caribou and reindeer feeding on the thalli of Peltigera, in general, species of Peltigera are not commonly used as a food source by mammals. A study of the grazing habits of the land snails Cantareus aspersa and Limax species revealed that these snails prefer to eat Peltigera species (such as P. praetextata) that are lacking in secondary metabolites.

=== Bioactive compounds ===
Peltigera leucophlebia contains the compounds tenuiorin and methyl orsellinate, which are inhibitory to the enzyme 15-lipoxygenase. Tenuiorin is also known to occur in P. apthosa, P. malacea and P. neckeri. A mixture of methyl and ethyl orsellinates have been identified from P. aphthosa that had antibacterial activity against Gram-positive and -negative bacteria. The novel non-protein amino acids solorinine and peltigerine have been detected in various species of Peltigera.
