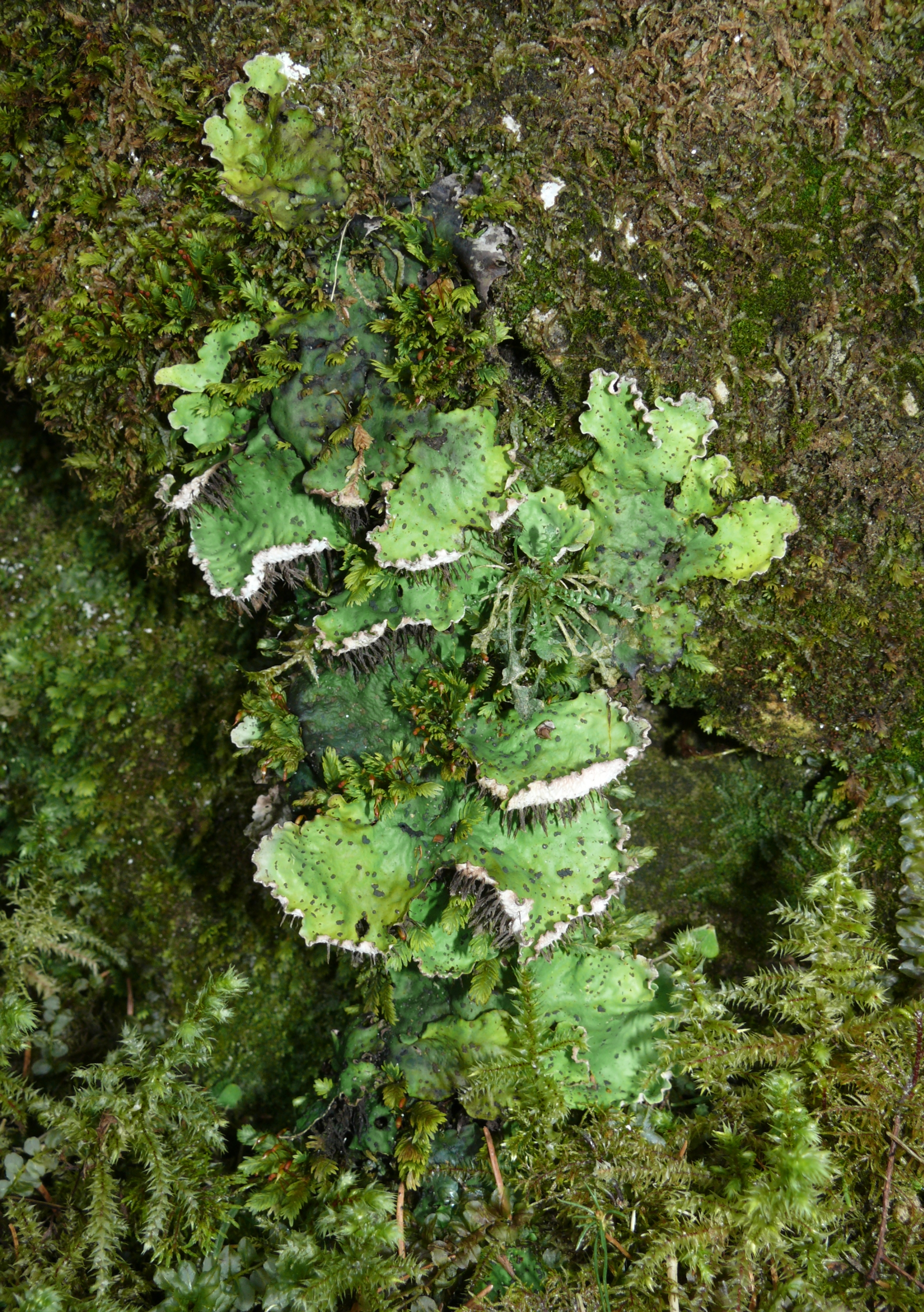
- Peltigera leucophlebia in Germany

Conservation status
- Secure (NatureServe)

Scientific classification
- Kingdom: Fungi
- Division: Ascomycota
- Class: Lecanoromycetes
- Order: Peltigerales
- Family: Peltigeraceae
- Genus: Peltigera
- Species: P. leucophlebia

Binomial name
- Peltigera leucophlebia (Nyl.) Gyeln. (1926)

Synonyms
- Peltigera aphthosa var. leucophlebia Nyl. (1860)

= Peltigera leucophlebia =

Species of lichenised fungus in the family Peltigeraceae

Peltigera leucophlebia is a lichenized fungus in the family Peltigeraceae. It is commonly called ruffled freckled pelt. This and other species in the genus contain a green algae in the genus Coccomyxa and also cyanobacteria in the genus Nostoc as symbionts.

== Description ==
The thallus of this lichen is gray or brown, but when it is wet, the bright green algae are clearly visible. The lower surface of the thallus is white.

== Distribution ==
This species is found in North America, Asia, and Europe. In North America, it is found in most of Alaska and Canada, the Great Lakes region, New England, the Rocky Mountains, and the Pacific coast.

== Ecology ==
Peltigera leucophlebia is a known host for the microfungus Pyrenidium actinellum.

== Uses ==
In Iceland, Peltigera leucophlebia was traditionally used to make porridge.

== Chemistry ==
Peltigera leucophlebia is known to contain tenuiorin, methylgyrophorate and gyrophoric acid. The thallus turns an ochre colour when performing during a K spot test.

== Gallery ==
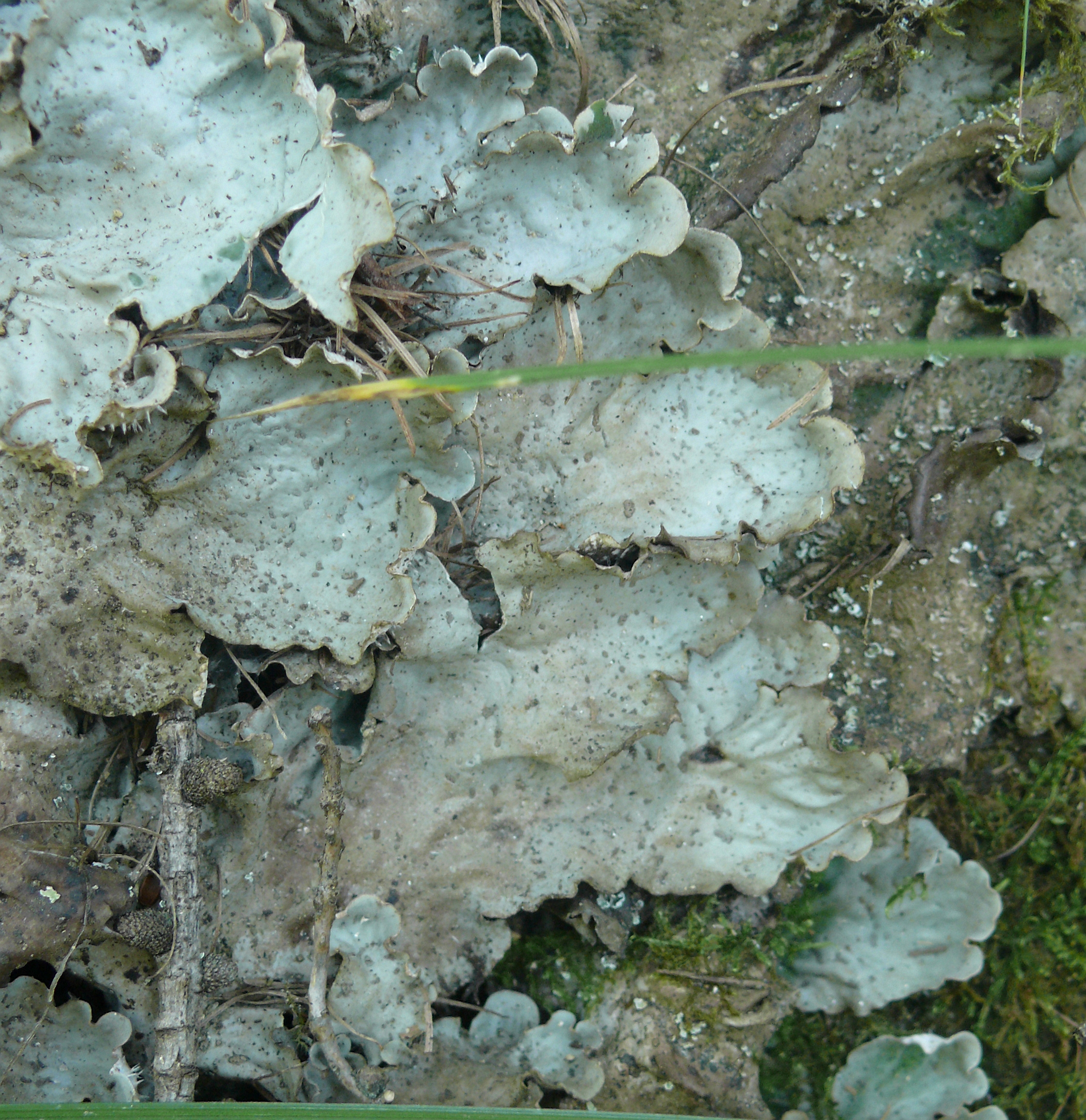
Peltigera leucophlebia Zillertaler Alpen, Italy

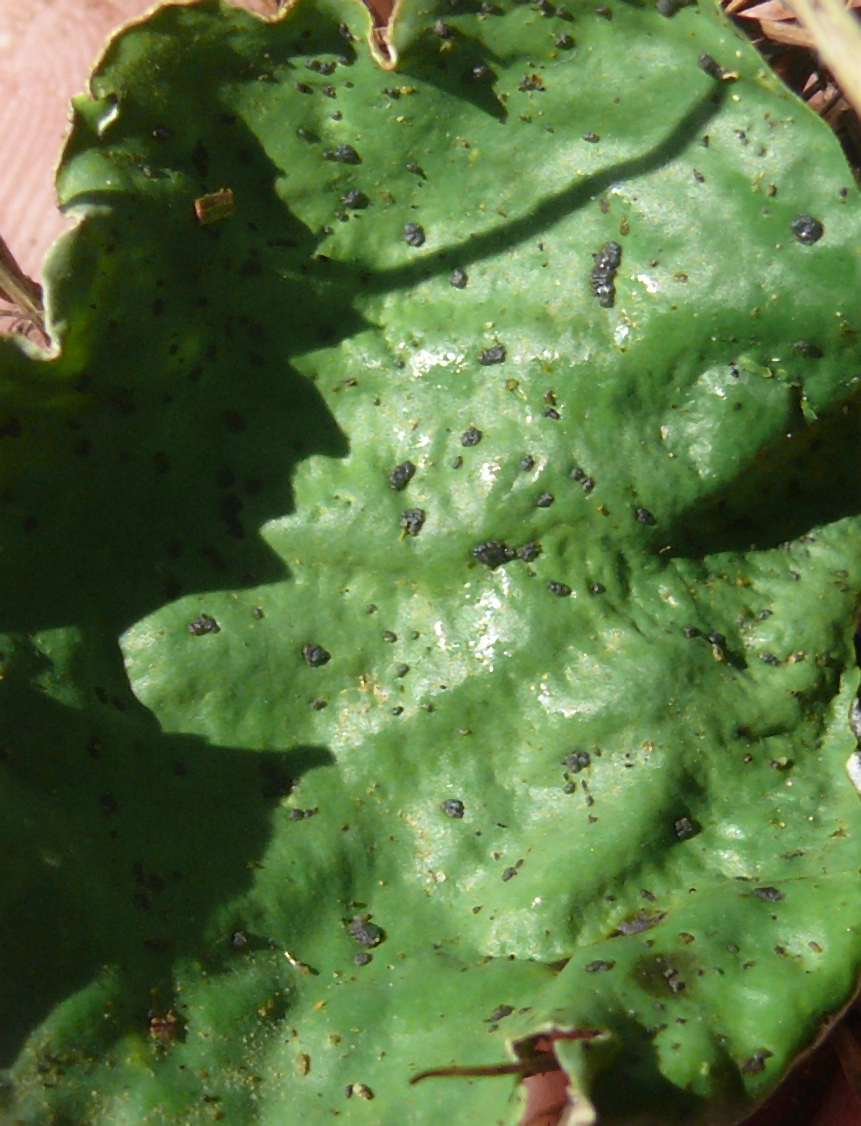
Peltigera leucophlebia Zillertaler Alpen, Italy

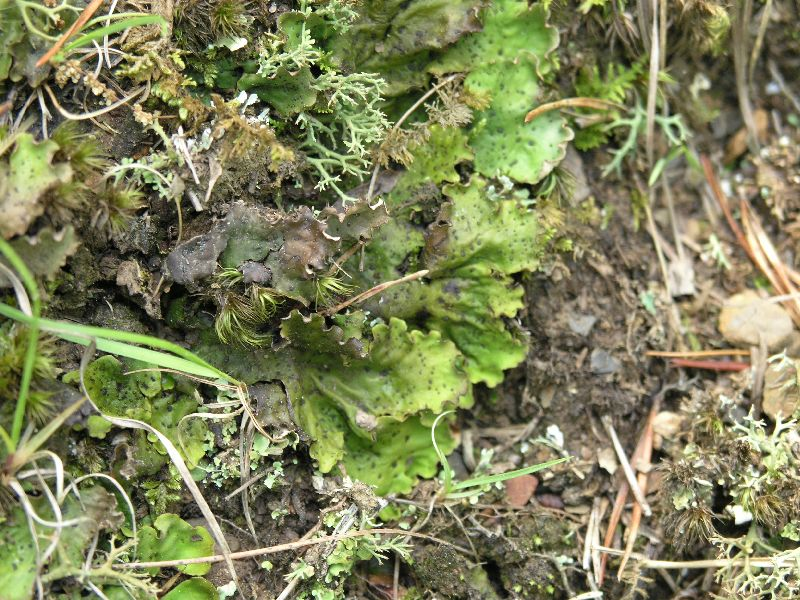
Peltigera leucophlebia near North Fork Mountain, West Virginia, USA. Open maple - red oak - black birch forest.
