= Orvo Vitikainen =

Finnish lichenologist

Orvo Vitikainen (born 11 October 1940 in Taipalsaari) is a Finnish lichenologist. He entered the University of Helsinki in 1961, from where he obtained a Candidate of Philosophy degree in 1966, and a Licentiate of Philosophy in 1971. He later earned a Ph.D. from this institution in 1994, under the supervision of Teuvo Ahti. Between the years 1961 and 1981 he was a junior curator of cryptogams at the University of Helsinki Botanical Garden, and then from 1983 to 2004 he was the head of the lichen herbarium. Here he managed the internationally valuable collections of the early lichenologists Erik Acharius and William Nylander. He has collected thousands of specimens for the herbarium from various locations in Finland, but also internationally, including Sweden, Norway, Denmark, Russian Karelia, Scotland, Austria, Italy, Hungary, Croatia, Montenegro, Tanzania, Kenya, British Columbia, and Brazil. In 1992–1994, he was a scientist of the Finnish Academy in the Ahti research group.

Vitikainen is an expert on the lichen flora of Finland and northwest Europe, and also a specialist on the lichen genus Peltigera. He contributed chapters on the families Peltigeraceae and Nephromataceae for the popular 2007 work Nordic Lichen Flora. He is also interested in the history of lichenology and has published several papers in this area. Vitikainen is honoured in the names of the lichens Atla vitikainenii, Nephroma orvoi, and Verrucaria vitikainenii. He is described by his colleagues as "a modest, patient, friendly and industrious colleague", and "an important joint in the great chain of lichenological tradition in Finland".

== Selected works ==
- Vitikainen, Orvo (1994). Taxonomic revision of Peltigera (lichenized Ascomycotina) in Europe (PDF). Acta Botanica Fennica. Vol. 152. pp. 1–96.
- Vitikainen, Orvo (1996). "Lichen floristics in Finland". Memoranda Societatis Pro Fauna et Flora Fennica. 72: 213–218.
- Vitikainen, Orvo (2001). "William Nylander (1822–1899) and lichen chemotaxonomy". The Bryologist. 104 (2): 263–267. doi:10.1639/0007-2745(2001)104[0263:WNALC]2.0.CO;2. S2CID 85930554.
- Magain, Nicolas; Tniong, Camille; Goward, Trevor; Niu, Dongling; Goffinet, Bernard; Sérusiaux, Emmanuel; Vitikainen, Orvo; Lutzoni, François; Miadlikowska, Jolanta (2018). "Species delimitation at a global scale reveals high species richness with complex biogeography and patterns of symbiont association in Peltigera section Peltigera (lichenized Ascomycota: Lecanoromycetes)". Taxon. 67 (5): 836–870. doi:10.12705/675.3. hdl:2268/228263. S2CID 92033227.
