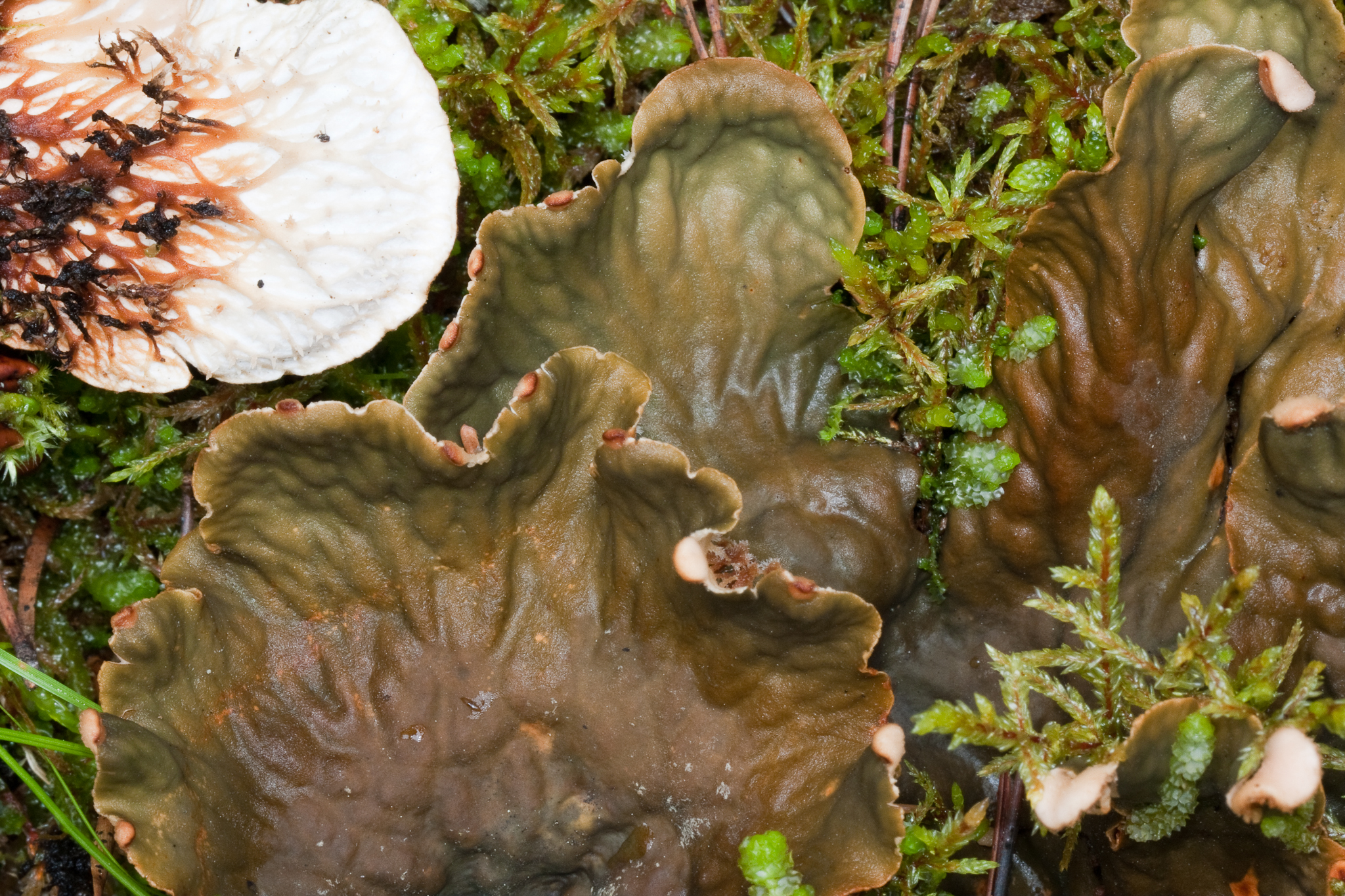
- Upper thallus surface of Peltigera cinnamomea contrasted with lower surface (upper left)

Conservation status
- Secure (NatureServe)

Scientific classification
- Kingdom: Fungi
- Division: Ascomycota
- Class: Lecanoromycetes
- Order: Peltigerales
- Family: Peltigeraceae
- Genus: Peltigera
- Species: P. cinnamomea

Binomial name
- Peltigera cinnamomea Goward (1995)
- Holotype: Clearwater River Basin, Canada

= Peltigera cinnamomea =

Species of lichen

Peltigera cinnamomea, commonly known as the cinnamon-pelt lichen, is a muscicolous (moss-dwelling), leafy lichen in the family Peltigeraceae. The Canadian lichenologist Trevor Goward formally described the species in 1995. The lichen is found in northwestern North America's forested regions, particularly in the unique montane and subalpine forest communities of the northern Rocky Mountains. Peltigera cinnamomea grows under prolonged snow cover, surviving well into spring. This trait distinguishes it from many other Peltigera species in similar North American forest ecosystems.

Peltigera cinnamomea forms a specialised symbiotic relationship with specific strains of the cyanobacterium Nostoc, enabling it to fix atmospheric nitrogen, crucial for survival in nutrient-poor environments. This lichen is part of the broadly defined species complex centred around the widely distributed Peltigera canina. Within this complex, P. cinnamomea falls under the CICADE group, indicating a preference for moist, woodland habitats.

Characterised by its leafy thallus, which is loosely attached to its substrate, P. cinnamomea typically measures 10–30 cm (4–12 in) in diameter. The thallus has a distinctive appearance, with a dull, billowed upper surface covered in a soft, dense growth of hairs. The species name cinnamomea is reflected in the pale tan undersurface of the thallus, featuring rusty-brown, cinnamon-coloured veins. The lichen produces apothecia (fruiting bodies) that bear clear ascospores with three internal partitions.

== Taxonomy ==
The type specimen of Peltigera cinnamomea was collected by the Canadian lichenologist Trevor Goward on 13 April 1985, within the Clearwater River Basin in British Columbia (Canada), at an elevation of 675 m (2,215 ft). The lichen was found growing over a mossy boulder situated in a boulder bed in an open, mixed forest. Peltigera cinnamomea was first scientifically documented by Goward in a 1994 report on the Peltigera species in Alberta, published by the Provincial Museum of Alberta. It did not, however, meet the specific standards for valid publication of a new species, due to non-compliance with Articles 39.1 and 40.1 of the nomenclatural rules, which require a clear description and the designation of a type specimen. Goward published it formally a year later in 1995, as part of a synopsis of Peltigera occurring in British Columbia. Peltigera cinnamomea, although readily recognisable in its natural habitat, was historically misidentified as P. praetextata, because both species share some superficial similarities. However, their distinct ecological preferences, alongside more detailed morphological differences, led to the formal recognition of P. cinnamomea.

The species epithet refers to the cinnamon-coloured veins on the thallus underside. Goward called it the "dog pelt" in a previous publication before it was officially named. It has also been referred to as the "cinnamon-pelt lichen".

Early (2003) molecular phylogenetics studies of taxa within the P. canina species complex delineated two major monophyletic groups, meaning they consist of all the descendants of a common ancestor, each with distinct ecological preferences. The two groups are known as CICADE and PORUDI. The acronym CICADE stands for "Cinnamomea, Canina, Degelii, and their close relatives", encompassing species that are primarily mesophytic, meaning they thrive in moderately moist environments, to subhygrophytic, indicating they prefer slightly wetter conditions. While these species typically occupy humid, woodland habitats, they can also be found in drier locations. Peltigera cinnamomea is a part of the CICADE group, reflecting its preference for environments that maintain moderate to high humidity. This categorisation is supported by genetic data that confirms its close relationship with other species in this group.

== Description ==
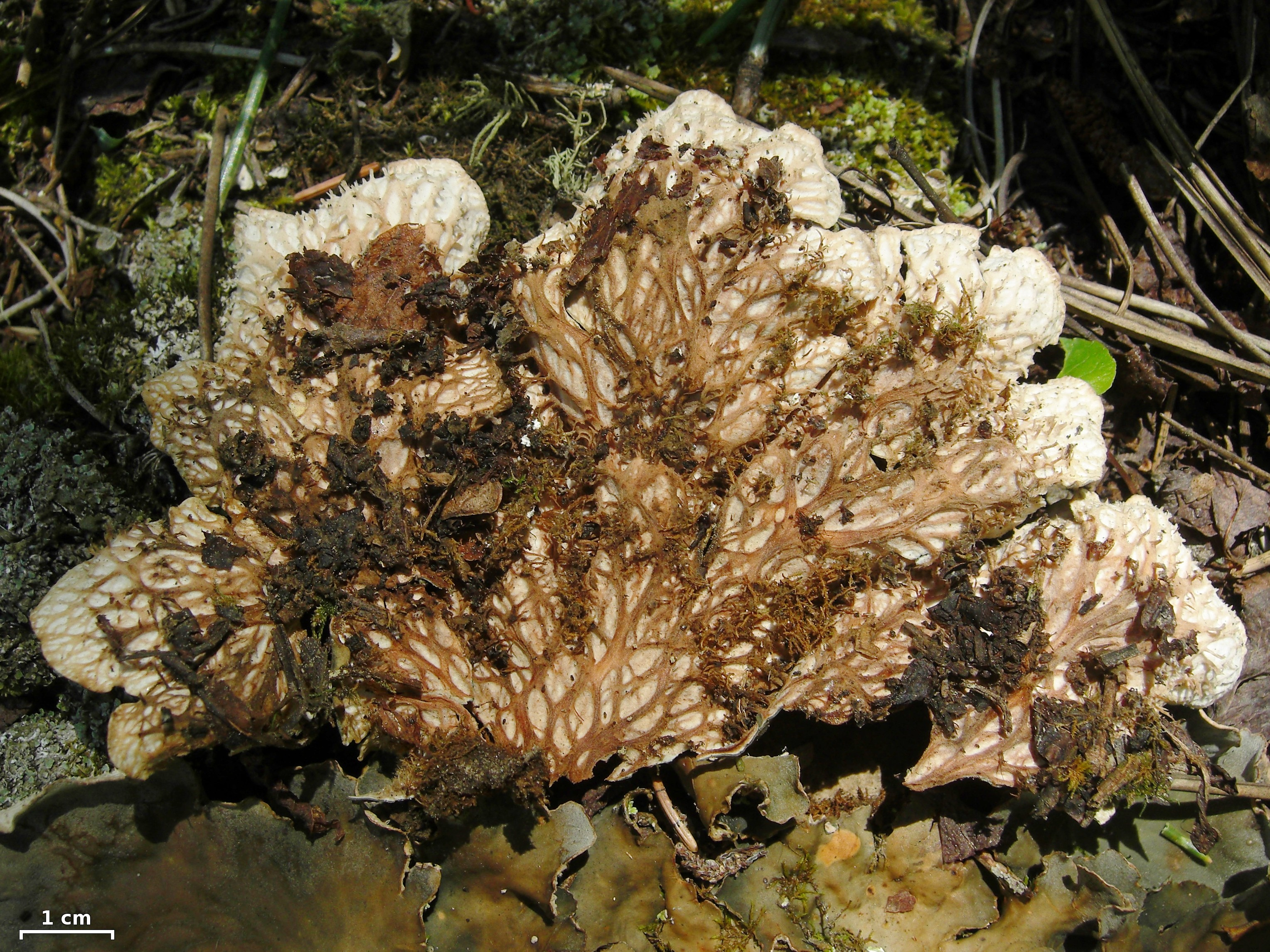
The thallus underside shows the cinnamon-coloured veins for which the lichen is named.

Peltigera cinnamomea is characterised by its foliose, loosely attached thallus, which typically spans 10–30 cm (4–12 in) in diameter. The structure of the thallus facilitates various ecological functions. The lobes of this lichen are somewhat leathery and stiff, measuring approximately 1 to 3 cm (0.4 to 1.2 in) in width, elongating and loosely overlapping with irregular branches. The tips of the lobes are rounded and may either lie flat or curve downwards, with generally smooth margins. The upper surface varies in colour from pale bluish-grey to pale brownish-grey, and may be tinged with shades of cinnamon brown. This surface is dull, often billowed broadly, and covered with a tomentum—a short, soft, dense growth of hairs—that tends to fade near the thallus centre.

The lichen lacks soredia (granular reproductive structures) and isidia (outgrowths containing both the algae and the fungus of the lichen), indicative of its specific reproductive and structural characteristics. The margins are devoid of lobules (small lobes).

The lower surface features pale tan veins that darken to rusty brown or cinnamon brown towards the centre. These veins are narrow, occasionally raised, and smooth (glabrous), while the areas between them (interstices) are whitish and moderately deep. The rhizines, root-like structures, match the colour of the veins and range from simple to intricately branched (penicillate), enhancing the lichen's attachment to its substrate.

The cortex of the thallus is 50–80 μm thick, and beneath this lies a photobiont layer, 20–80 μm thick, hosting the cyanobacterium Nostoc. The medulla, a loosely packed layer of fungal hyphae located beneath the photobiont layer, is white and measures 70–180 μm in thickness.

Apothecia (fruiting bodies) are commonly found at the margins on narrow, elongate lobes. These bear a medium brown, longitudinally folded disc, averaging 6–10 mm in length and typically erect. The ascospores are clear (hyaline), three-septate, and measure 40–49 μm in length by 3–5 μm in width, with eight spores per ascus (the spore-bearing sacs). Conidiomata (asexual reproductive structures) have not been observed to occur in this species.

Other than trace amounts of unidentified substances, no secondary metabolites (lichen products) have been detected in this species.

== Photobiont ==
Peltigera cinnamomea forms a specialised symbiotic relationship with the cyanobacterium Nostoc, which serves as its primary photosynthetic partner (photobiont). Unlike many lichens that may associate with various Nostoc strains, P. cinnamomea specifically partners with certain genetic clusters of Nostoc. Genetic studies have identified specific clusters of Nostoc, indicating a closely adapted relationship where the lichen's fungal component and its photosynthetic partner have co-evolved to maximise mutual survival benefits. This partnership benefits P. cinnamomea by enabling it to efficiently fix atmospheric nitrogen, vital for thriving in nutrient-sparse environments. This tailored relationship suggests that the distribution of P. cinnamomea may be closely tied to the presence of its specific Nostoc partners, reflecting a delicate balance between the lichen and its preferred photobiont environments.

== Similar species ==
Peltigera cinnamomea is often recognisable in its natural habitat but was frequently misidentified as P. praetextata in taxonomic classifications. Unlike P. praetextata, which has brownish or tan-coloured veins that are often tomentose and partially erect, P. cinnamomea has paler veins. P. praetextata has somewhat crisped lobe margins with lobules, particularly on older parts of the thallus. Both species occur throughout inland British Columbia, but P. cinnamomea predominantly inhabits areas with prolonged snow cover, persisting until May or June, conditions under which P. praetextata is absent.

Lookalikes
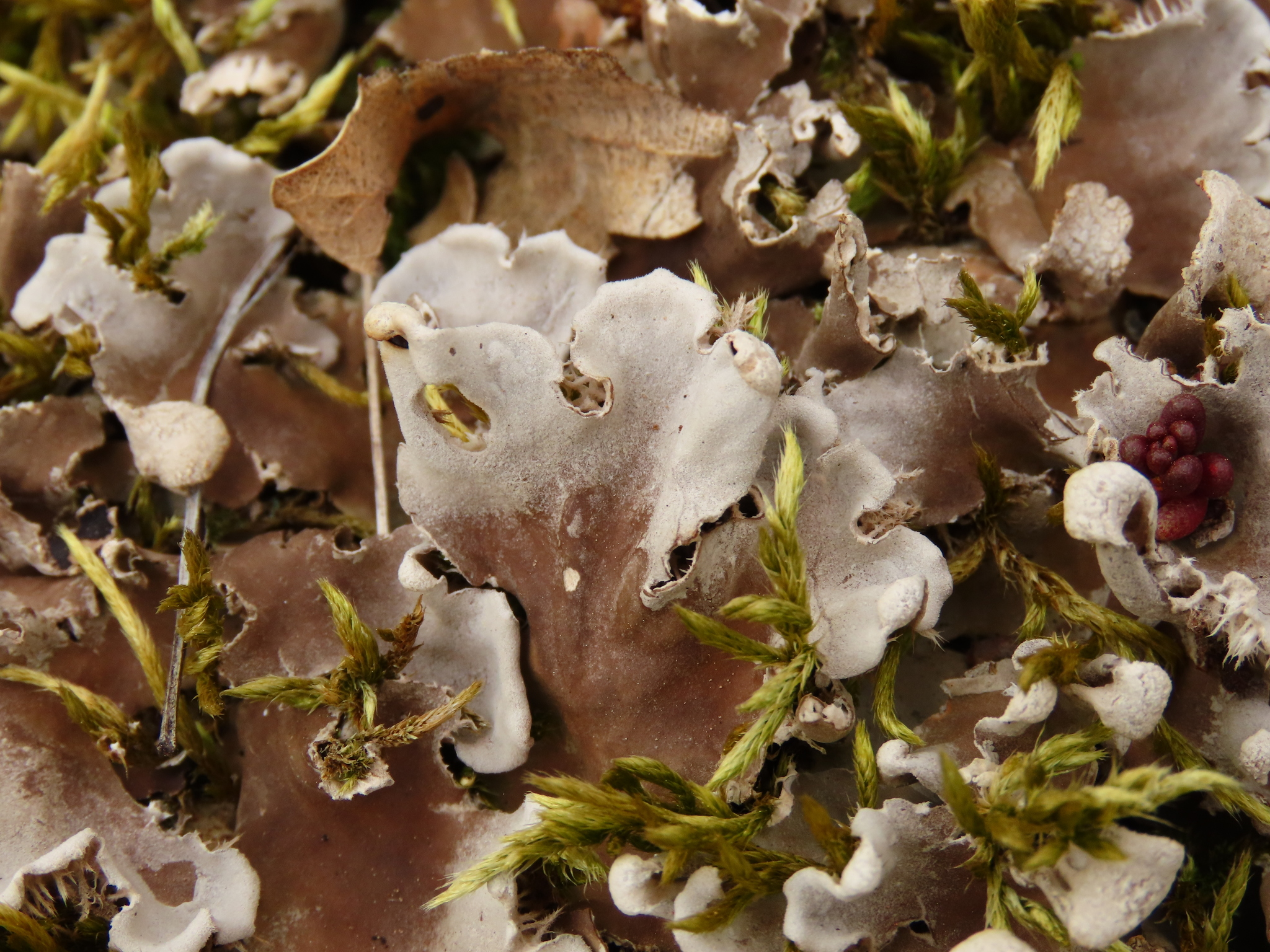
Peltigera canina

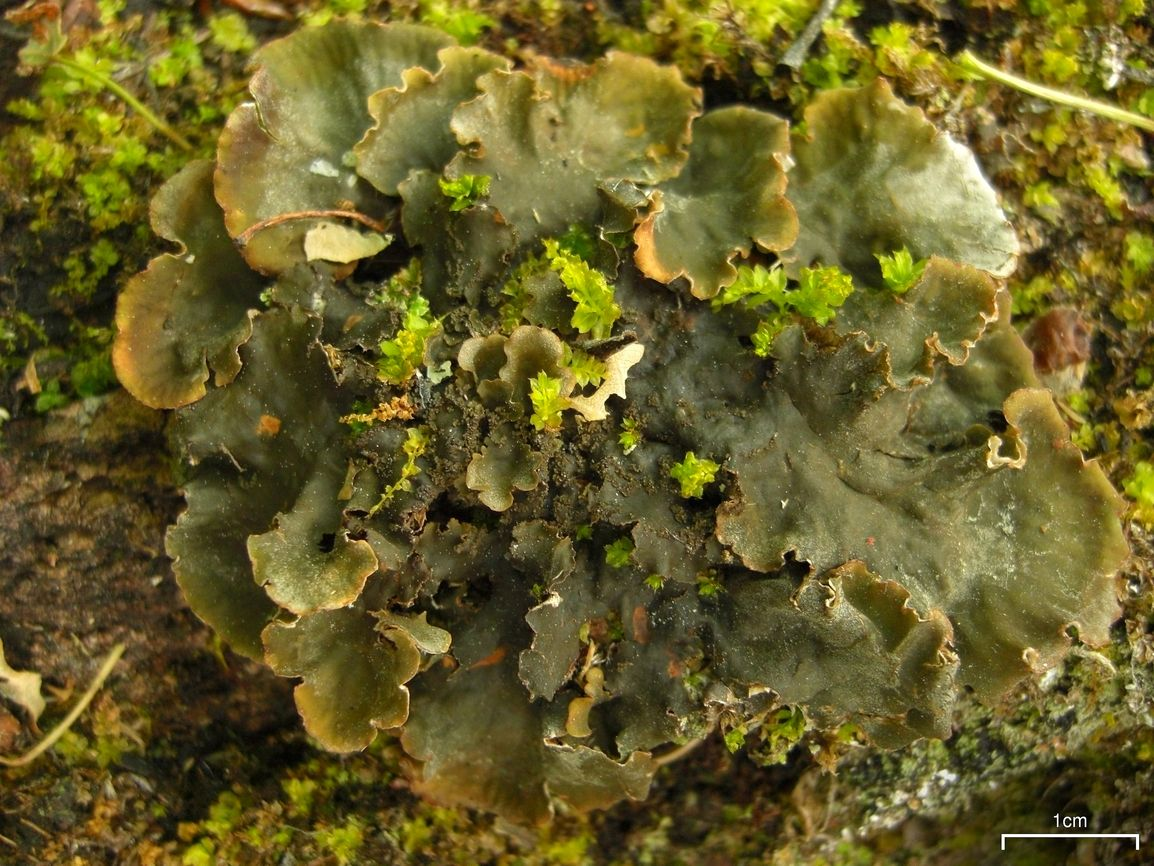
Peltigera praetextata

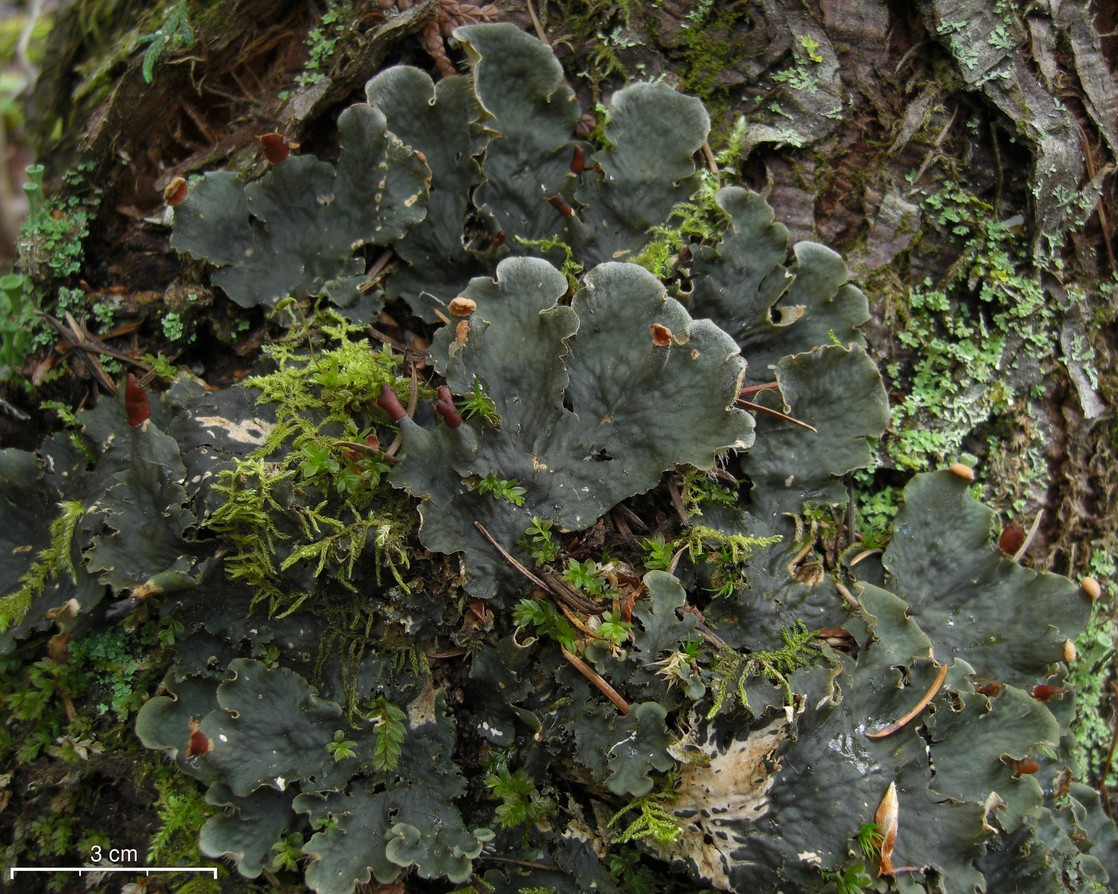
Peltigera membranacea

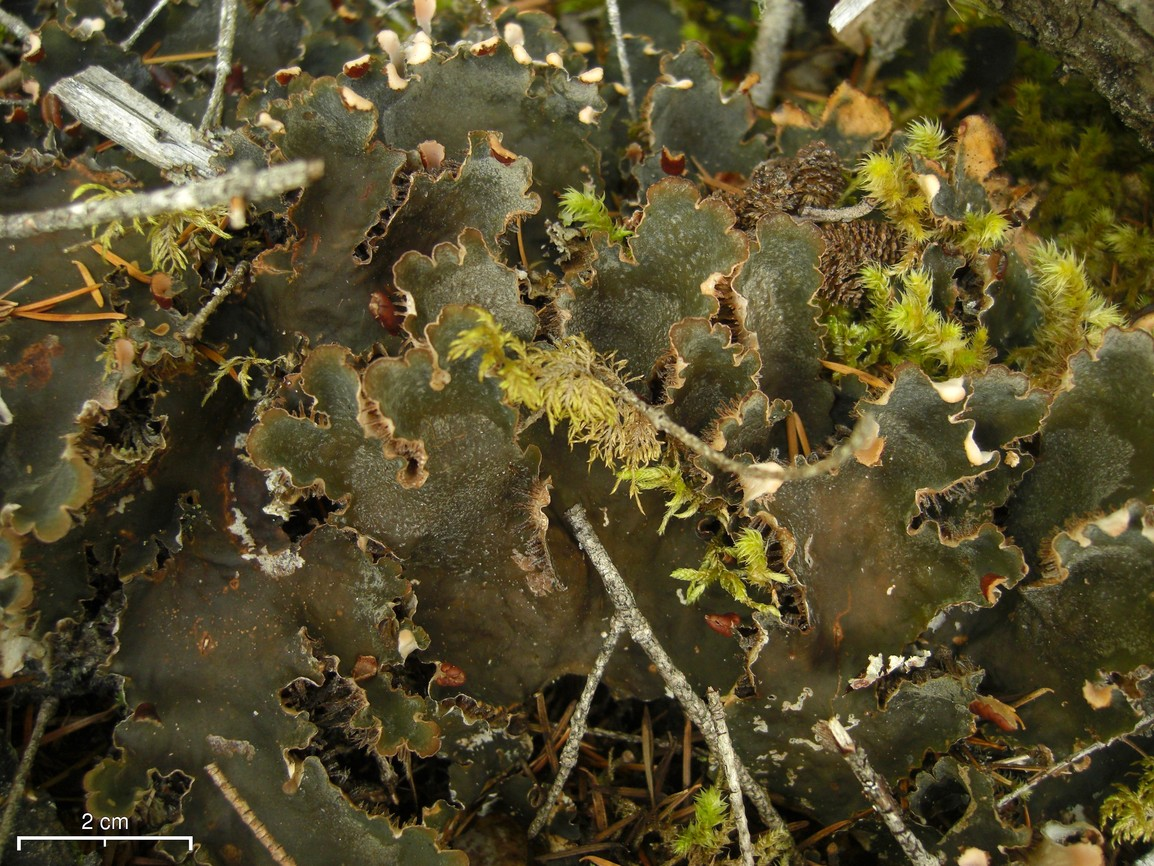
Peltigera retifoveata

Peltigera cinnamomea closely resembles the isidiate lichen P. evansiana, suggesting they might form a species pair, where the primary species is fertile, and the secondary species reproduces vegetatively. This similarity warrants careful observation for accurate identification.

Within the genus Peltigera, P. cinnamomea is grouped with species that feature Nostoc as a primary photobiont and have an appressed laminal tomentum. It shares similar lobe widths of 1.5–3 cm (0.6–1.2 in) with P. canina, P. membranacea, and P. retifoveata, unlike the narrower lobes of P. didactyla and P. ponojensis. The veins of P. cinnamomea—pale to cinnamon brown and low to partly raised—differ markedly from the darker, more elevated veins of P. praetextata and the broad, strongly raised veins of P. retifoveata. Apothecia are frequently observed in P. cinnamomea, similar to P. canina, P. membranacea, and P. rufescens, but less common in P. retifoveata. Unlike most species in this comparison, only P. retifoveata consistently demonstrates chemical traits, whereas P. cinnamomea does not. P. cinnamomea prefers mesic to hygric environments, particularly snowy locales, unlike the xeric to mesic habitats preferred by P. canina, P. didactyla, and P. ponojensis. These distinctions in ecological adaptations and morphological features help identify and differentiate P. cinnamomea from closely related species.

== Habitat and distribution ==
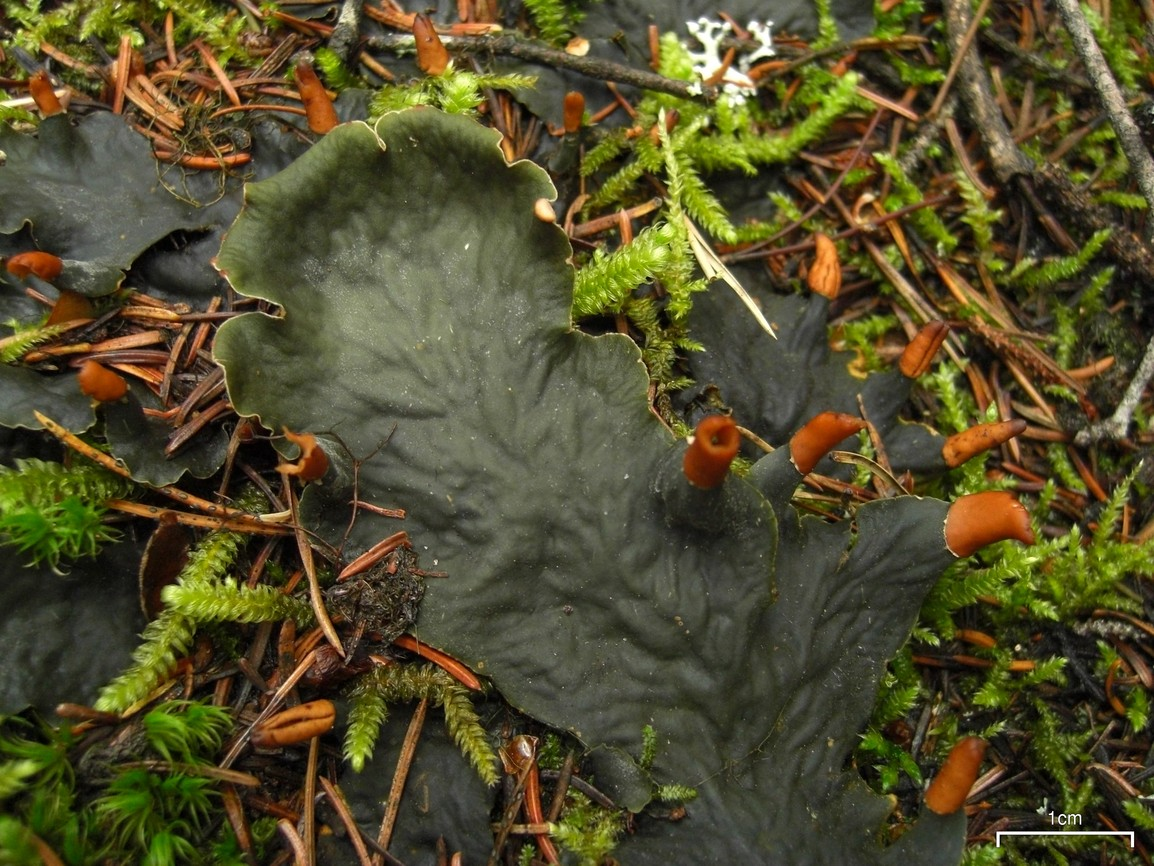
Folded, brownish apothecia arise at the ends of elongated lobes and are usually erect.

Peltigera cinnamomea inhabits various forested areas across western North America. It predominantly grows on moss, moss-covered rocks, and logs, in open and somewhat sheltered inland forests at various elevations. This species adapts well to mesophytic to hygrophytic conditions and is particularly prevalent in areas with prolonged snow cover, often surviving under snow until late spring or early summer (May or June). This resilience makes it one of the most snow-tolerant Peltigera species that occur in the local lichen funga.

Peltigera cinnamomea is extensively documented and is locally widespread in suitable forested habitats. It is most abundant in the Rocky Mountains. In Canada, collections have been made in Alberta at Swan Hills and in British Columbia at multiple locations, including the Clearwater River Basin, Skeena River Basin, Skagit River Basin, Fraser River Basin, and Nechako River Basin. In the United States, it has been identified in Montana at Lake Country and in Pend Oreille County, Washington. It also occurs in Oregon. In Alaska, most records of the lichen are from the southeast region of the state. P. cinnamomea is one of 29 Peltigera species in the Pacific Northwest region of North America.

== Ecology ==
Peltigera cinnamomea grows in specific ecological communities within montane and subalpine forests in the northern Rocky Mountains, particularly in the northern Whitefish Range, Montana, USA. These communities are classified in a unique forest order called Calamagrostio-Pseudotsugetalia glaucae, characterised by its dominant plant species and unique environmental conditions. Though termed an "order", this classification groups ecosystems with similar species and interactions, typical of valley bottoms and lower slopes across northwestern North America. These forests are distinct from the coastal forests of the Vaccinio-Piceetea class, filling niches similar to those of broad-leaved forests in other temperate regions. Influenced by Pacific air masses, these areas benefit from moist conditions and extensive snow cover, providing a stable environment for the growth of species like P. cinnamomea.

== Conservation ==
Peltigera cinnamomea has an "S5" provincial conservation status in British Columbia, meaning it is "demonstrably widespread, abundant, and secure". It is also listed as "yellow" in the B.C. List Status, indicating that it is "apparently secure and not at risk of extinction". It has not been assessed by the Committee on the Status of Endangered Wildlife in Canada. In Oregon, it was listed as a "taxon of concern" by the Oregon Biodiversity Information Center in 2016.
