= Halegrapha mexicana =

Scientific classification
- Kingdom: Fungi
- Division: Ascomycota
- Class: Lecanoromycetes
- Order: Graphidales
- Family: Graphidaceae
- Genus: Halegrapha
- Species: H. mexicana

Binomial name
- Halegrapha mexicana A.B.Peña & Lücking (2011)
- Type locality: Catemaco, Mexico

Species of lichen-forming fungus

Halegrapha mexicana is a corticolous (bark-dwelling) species of script lichen in the family Graphidaceae. It forms a thin, whitish-grey crust on tree bark and produces black, elongated, slit-like fruiting bodies with an exposed disc. The species was formally described in 2011 from specimens collected in Veracruz, Mexico. It is known only from tropical lowland rainforest near Catemaco.

== Taxonomy ==
Halegrapha mexicana was formally described as new to science in 2011 by Alejandrina Bárcenas Peña and Robert Lücking, within the genus Halegrapha. The type was collected in Mexico (Veracruz), near Catemaco in the Reserva Ecológica del Ejido Adolfo López Mateos, where it was found on bark in tropical lowland rainforest at about 365 m (1,198 ft) elevation. The holotype is deposited in herbarium of the National Autonomous University of Mexico (MEXU).

In the original description, the authors treated Halegrapha as an unusual "in-between" genus: it has a Graphis-like outward look (dark, carbonized lirellae on a pale, crystal-rich thallus), but its internal features (especially the inspersed hymenium and brown, septate spores) align it with the Phaeographis lineage. They considered H. mexicana most similar to H. chimaera but separated it by its consistently exposed disc, a more strongly carbonized excipulum at the base, and slightly larger spores with more septa. It was also compared with the superficially similar Graphis handelii group, from which it differs in hymenial and spore characters typical of Halegrapha.

== Description ==
Halegrapha mexicana forms a thin, continuous crust on bark, typically 1–3 cm across and about 30–50 μm thick. The thallus is white to gray and smooth to somewhat uneven, without a distinct prothallus (a marginal border of fungal tissue). In section, it has a cartilaginous upper cortex and an uneven photobiont layer, with conspicuous clusters of crystals in the thallus.

The fruiting bodies are flexuose lirellae (elongate, slit-like apothecia) that break through the thallus surface. They are usually unbranched, lack a thalline margin, and have an exposed disc with black, entire lips. Microscopically, the excipulum is completely carbonized, and the hymenium is colorless but inspersed with irregular droplets. The asci contain eight brown ascospores that are 5–7-septate and measure about 17–25 × 6–8 μm. No lichen substances were detected by thin-layer chromatography.

=== Similar species ===
Species of Halegrapha are separated mainly by whether the hymenium is clear or inspersed, by ascospore septation, and by secondary chemistry, along with details of thallus and lirellae morphology. Halegrapha mucronata is most likely to be confused with the other Halegrapha species that have a clear hymenium, especially H. kenyana and H. yakushimensis. It differs from them in its much longer, 7–9-septate ascospores, norstictic-acid chemistry, and black lirellae with only a basal thalline margin. H. kenyana has smaller, 3–5-septate ascospores and stictic acid chemistry, while H. yakushimensis lacks secondary compounds and has small, somewhat muriform (multichambered) ascospores and much shorter lirellae with a concealed disc and exposed black labia.

== Habitat and distribution ==
Halegrapha mexicana is a corticolous (bark-dwelling) species known from Veracruz, Mexico, where it has been collected in tropical lowland rainforest at about 360–378 m elevation. Reported substrates include bark of Pseudolmedia oxyphyllaria, Myriocarpa longipes, and Calophyllum brasiliense. In the original treatment, all cited collections came from the same reserve and were made in 2009, and no broader distribution was reported beyond this area.
