= Halegrapha redonographoides =

Scientific classification
- Kingdom: Fungi
- Division: Ascomycota
- Class: Lecanoromycetes
- Order: Graphidales
- Family: Graphidaceae
- Genus: Halegrapha
- Species: H. redonographoides

Binomial name
- Halegrapha redonographoides J.C.Dantas, Lücking & M.Cáceres (2017)
- Type locality: Fazenda Santa Maria da Lage, Brazil

Species of lichen-forming fungus

Halegrapha redonographoides is a species of bark-dwelling script lichen in the family Graphidaceae. It forms a cream-coloured to beige crust on tree bark and produces curved, slit-like fruiting bodies that are sunken into the thallus surface. The species was described in 2017 from northeastern Brazil, where it occurs in Caatinga dry forest and transitional Cerrado vegetation. It is one of the few members of its genus known to contain norstictic acid.

== Taxonomy ==
Halegrapha redonographoides was described as a new species by Jaciele de Oliveira Dantas, Robert Lücking, and Marcela Cáceres. The type material was collected in Brazil (Sergipe state) from tree bark in a Caatinga vegetation remnant at Fazenda Santa Maria da Lage, near Poço Verde, at about 390 m (1,280 ft) elevation.

The authors placed the species in the genus Halegrapha because it combines a pale, crystal-rich, Graphis-like thallus and thick, carbonized lirellae with small brown spores (a "Phaeographis-type" spore form). The epithet redonographoides refers to its Redonographa-like look, especially the somewhat pseudostromatic arrangement of the immersed lirellae, although it differs from Redonographa in being bark-dwelling and in having brown ascospores. In the protologue it was separated from the similar Halegrapha mucronata by its ecorticate thallus, the immersed (pseudostromatic) lirellae, a completely carbonized excipulum, and small, somewhat muriform ascospores. It also contains norstictic acid, a chemistry otherwise reported for only a small number of Halegrapha species.

== Description ==
The lichen forms a crust on bark (a corticolous, crustose thallus), typically 3–5 cm (1.2–2.0 in) across, with a rough, uneven surface that is cream-colored to beige. In cross-section the thallus is about 100–200 μm thick and lacks a well-developed cortex (it is ecorticate). The algal partner is Trentepohlia, and the photobiont layer is irregular and broken up by large clusters of crystals.

The fruiting bodies are slit-like apothecia (lirellae) that are usually unbranched and curved, and they are sunken into thicker parts of the thallus that can resemble low pseudostromata. The disc is concealed, while the labia are distinct, entire, and gray-black. Internally, the excipulum is black and completely carbonized, and the hymenium is clear and colorless. The asci are clavate and eight-spored. Mature ascospores are brown, broadly ellipsoid, and somewhat muriform (with several transverse septa and occasional longitudinal septa), measuring about 10–15 × 6–10 μm, and they give an I+ (purplish-red) staining reaction when mature. Chemical tests and thin-layer chromatography indicate norstictic acid as the major lichen substance (with connorstictic acid in trace amounts); sections show a K+ (yellow) reaction that produces red, needle-like crystals.

== Habitat and distribution ==
This species is currently known from Brazil, with records from Sergipe (in Caatinga vegetation) and Tocantins (in vegetation transitional toward Cerrado). It grows on tree bark. No additional Brazilian collection locations had been reported as of 2025.
