= Halegrapha paulseniana =

Scientific classification
- Kingdom: Fungi
- Division: Ascomycota
- Class: Lecanoromycetes
- Order: Graphidales
- Family: Graphidaceae
- Genus: Halegrapha
- Species: H. paulseniana

Binomial name
- Halegrapha paulseniana Luch & Lücking (2018)
- Holotype: Waikamoi Preserve, Hawaii

Species of lichen-forming fungus

Halegrapha paulseniana is a species of bark-dwelling script lichen in the family Graphidaceae. It forms a cream-white crust on tree bark and produces elongated, branching, script-like fruiting bodies with a partly exposed dark disc. The species was described in 2018 and was the first member of its genus recorded from Hawaii. It is known only from montane forest on the slopes of Haleakalā volcano on Maui, where it may be endemic.

== Taxonomy ==
Halegrapha paulseniana was described as new to science in 2018 by Rubin Michael Luch and Robert Lücking, based on a collection made in 2013 on the island of Maui (Hawaii) in the lower Waikamoi Preserve on the slopes of Haleakalā. Its description also represented the first documented record of the genus Halegrapha from the Hawaiian Islands.

The species belongs to Halegrapha, a genus of tropical Graphidaceae with a script lichen appearance (elongated fruiting bodies on a pale thallus) but brown, Phaeographis-type spores. In the original treatment, H. paulseniana was distinguished from the most similar species, H. mexicana, by its much larger lirellae that retain a complete, thin thalline margin at the apex; it was separated from other members of the genus by the excipulum, which is often not fully carbonized (blackened) along the sides. The specific epithet honors the German educator and philosopher Friedrich Paulsen (1846–1909), regarded as one of the founders of modern higher secondary education in Germany, and the namesake of the Paulsen-Gymnasium.

== Description ==
Halegrapha paulseniana is a bark-dwelling, crustose lichen that forms a continuous, uneven, cream-white thallus up to about 5 cm (2 in) across. In section, the thallus has a thick upper layer over an irregular algal zone and a distinct medulla, and parts of the thallus are encrusted with grayish crystals; the thallus tissue over the fruiting bodies can contain clusters of calcium oxalate crystals. The photobiont (photosynthetic algal partner) is Trentepohlia.

The fruiting bodies are lirellae (elongated, script-like structures) that are flexuose and irregularly branched, typically 3–8 mm long. They break through the thallus surface and have a thalline margin that is thick on the sides but thin at the top. The disc is partly exposed and dark brown to nearly black, with entire labia (raised edges). The excipulum (the wall surrounding the disc) is largely carbonized, but the lateral portions are often only weakly carbonized or uncarbonized. The asci contain eight spores; the ascospores are oblong to oval, usually 5–7-septate, about 20–25 × 7–8 μm, and turn brown at maturity (becoming darker and shriveled when overmature). No lichen substances were detected by thin-layer chromatography.

== Habitat and distribution ==
Halegrapha paulseniana is known only from the Waikamoi Preserve on Maui, Hawaii, where it was collected at about 1,200–1,300 m (3,900–4,300 ft) elevation in disturbed primary forest on Haleakalā volcano. The site was described as forest dominated by Acacia koa and members of the Campanulaceae, with the invasive ginger Hedychium gardnerianum present in lower parts of the area. Because it has not yet been found elsewhere, it has been treated as a putative Hawaiian endemic. The authors noted that parts of the preserve are threatened by the spread of Hedychium gardnerianum, which can overtake forest ecosystems and may endanger local endemic species.
