= Halegrapha =

Scientific classification
- Kingdom: Fungi
- Division: Ascomycota
- Class: Lecanoromycetes
- Order: Graphidales
- Family: Graphidaceae
- Genus: Halegrapha; Rivas Plata & Lücking (2011)

Type species
- Halegrapha chimaera Rivas Plata & Lücking (2011)

Species
- See text

Genus of lichen-forming fungi

Halegrapha is a genus of lichen-forming fungi in the family Graphidaceae. It comprises ten species. Members of the genus form pale grey to whitish thalli that are often strongly encrusted with calcium oxalate crystals, and produce black, script-like fruiting bodies (lirellae) that resemble those of Graphis. Microscopic features and DNA evidence, however, place Halegrapha among a different lineage of graphid lichens allied to Phaeographis. Species are known mainly from humid forest habitats in scattered tropical and temperate localities worldwide.

== Taxonomy ==
Halegrapha was established in 2011 by Eimy Rivas Plata and Robert Lücking to accommodate a small group of lirellate (script-like) Graphidaceae that did not fit comfortably in existing genera. In their original circumscription, the authors included six species (five newly described and one new combination), with H. chimaera designated as the type species.

The genus was described as a morphological "chimera" because it combines traits typical of different genera. Externally, it looks much like Graphis, with black, strongly carbonised lirellae on a pale thallus heavily encrusted with calcium oxalate crystals. Under the microscope, however, it matches Phaeographis and related genera, especially in the structure of the hymenium and in having brown, septate ascospores. DNA sequence data available at the time (from the type species) placed Halegrapha within the broader Phaeographis clade, while remaining genetically distinct from the genera then recognised in that lineage, including Platygramme.

The generic name honours the American lichenologist Mason E. Hale Jr., who collected early material of the group (later described as H. intergrapha) and recognised its unusual combination of characters but did not publish it. Additional species were described after the genus was introduced, including H. redonographoides from northeast Brazil (2017), H. masoniana from Sri Lanka (2014), H. yakushimensis from southern Japan (2014), and H. paulseniana from Hawaii (2018).

== Description ==
Species of Halegrapha are crustose lichens forming a continuous thallus that is typically white to grey and lacks a distinct prothallus. In section, the thallus has a firm (cartilaginous) upper cortex, an uneven photobiont layer, and conspicuous clusters of crystals concentrated above and among the algal layer; the crystals are calcium oxalate and are a prominent feature of the genus. The photobiont is the green alga Trentepohlia.

The fruiting bodies are black lirellae that sit within the thallus surface but often break through it as they develop (immersed to erumpent). A basal to lateral thalline margin is present in some species but can be reduced or absent in others; the disc (the spore-bearing surface) is usually concealed and only rarely becomes exposed. The lips (labia) are typically thick and black, usually remaining entire, although in some species they become striate with age. Internally, the excipulum (the wall around the disc) is carbonised (blackened) at least near the top (apically), and in many species it is also carbonised along the sides or throughout. The hypothecium (tissue below the hymenium) is prosoplectenchymatous (made of lengthwise hyphae) and colourless to pale yellowish. The hymenium is usually inspersed (filled with droplets, the "Phaeographis type"), but in some species it remains clear.

Ascospores are grey-brown to brown at maturity. In the core circumscription of the genus they are transversely septate and oblong-ellipsoid, with rounded ends or a slightly tapering distal end. They show an iodine reaction described as I+ vine-red. Spore form varies among species. For example, some taxa have terminally appendiculate ("mucronate") spores. Later-described species broaden the known range of variation. Halegrapha masoniana has especially large ascospores and contains norstictic acid, while Halegrapha yakushimensis was placed in Halegrapha only provisionally and differs from other described members of the genus in having muriform spores and an iodine-negative spore reaction.

Secondary chemistry is variable in the genus. Many species lack detectable lichen substances, while others contain compounds of the stictic acid or norstictic acid groups (and related minor substances).

== Habitat, distribution, and ecology ==
Species of Halegrapha are predominantly corticolous lichens, forming crustose thalli on the bark of tree trunks and branches as epiphytes, most often in humid forest habitats. The genus is currently known from a scattered set of localities across tropical and temperate regions, including Malesia (the Philippines and Malaysia), Sri Lanka, Japan, coastal Kenya, Florida and Mexico, the Hawaiian Islands, and Australia and New Zealand. In Brazil, H. redonographoides was found in an isolated remnant of semi-arid Caatinga vegetation in Sergipe state, with additional material reported from Tocantins.

Published records span a wide elevational range, from sea level to about 300 m in lowland dipterocarp forests in Malaysia to about 1,500 m in montane forest on Yakushima, Japan. Collections have come from tropical lowland rainforest in Mexico and lower montane rainforest in the Philippines, as well as montane forests in Sri Lanka and Hawaii; some sites are described as partially disturbed or logged forest, whereas H. floridana is known from an old-growth cypress swamp in southern Florida.

Substrate data are sparse for most Halegrapha species, but where recorded they include a variety of host trees; for example, H. mexicana has been reported from bark of Pseudolmedia oxyphyllaria, Myriocarpa longipes and Calophyllum brasiliense in Veracruz rainforest, and the Hawaiian H. paulseniana was found in montane forest dominated by Acacia koa. An exception to the predominantly bark-dwelling habit is H. yakushimensis, which is primarily muscicolous, growing over moss at the base of trunks and only secondarily extending onto adjacent bark.

Most Halegrapha species are currently known from few collections and often only from their type localities. H. mucronata is the main exception, being common and widespread in Australasia and, in Tasmania, often becoming a dominant epiphyte in coastal scrub and woodland communities. In Hawaii, the only known locality of H. paulseniana lies in Waikamoi Preserve on Maui, where the spread of the invasive ginger Hedychium gardnerianum was noted as a potential threat to the forest ecosystem and its endemic biota.

== Species ==
Ten species are accepted in Halegrapha:

- Halegrapha chimaera Rivas Plata & Lücking (2011) – Philippines
- Halegrapha floridana Common & Lücking (2011) – Florida
- Halegrapha intergrapha Hale ex Lücking (2011) – Malaysia
- Halegrapha kenyana Kalb & Lücking (2011) – Kenya
- Halegrapha masoniana Weerakoon, Lücking & Lumbsch (2014) – Sri Lanka
- Halegrapha mexicana A.B.Peña & Lücking (2011) – Mexico
- Halegrapha mucronata (Stirt.) Lücking (2011) – Australia
- Halegrapha paulseniana Luch & Lücking (2018) – Hawaii
- Halegrapha redonographoides J.C.Dantas, Lücking & M.Cáceres (2017) – Brazil
- Halegrapha yakushimensis M.Nakan., Kashiw. & K.H.Moon (2014) – Japan
