= Halegrapha yakushimensis =

Scientific classification
- Kingdom: Fungi
- Division: Ascomycota
- Class: Lecanoromycetes
- Order: Graphidales
- Family: Graphidaceae
- Genus: Halegrapha
- Species: H. yakushimensis

Binomial name
- Halegrapha yakushimensis M.Nakan., Kashiw. & K.H.Moon (2014)

Species of lichen-forming fungus

Halegrapha yakushimensis is a species of lichen-forming fungus in the family Graphidaceae. It forms a smooth, greenish-grey crust and produces short, narrow, slit-like fruiting bodies. Unlike most script lichens, it grows primarily over moss rather than directly on bark. The species is known only from montane forest on Yakushima Island in southern Japan.

== Taxonomy ==
Halegrapha yakushimensis was described as a new species in 2014 by Minoru Nakanishi, Hiroyuki Kashiwadani and Kwang Hee Moon, based on material collected on Yakushima Island (Kagoshima Prefecture) in southern Japan. The type specimen was collected in March 2012 from the Yodogawa area and is housed in the herbarium of the National Museum of Nature and Science (TNS).

In the protologue, the authors compared the species with Halegrapha chimaera and separated it by the fully carbonized (blackened) excipulum, a clear hymenium lacking granular inclusions (i.e., not inspersed), and muriform (brick-like) spores. They also treated its generic placement as provisional: it was placed in Halegrapha because it combines carbonized exciples, an iodine-positive hymenium, and brown spores, but it differs from other described species of the genus in having spores that do not react with iodine and have small internal chambers (locules) with thickened walls.

== Description ==
This is a crustose script lichen that forms a smooth, continuous, greenish-grey thallus about 200–300 μm thick. It is primarily muscicolous (growing over moss), but the thallus may extend onto adjacent tree bark. The apothecia are lirellae: short, narrow, and usually unbranched (or only very sparsely branched), up to about 1.6 mm long. They erupt through the thallus and are bordered by thallus tissue at the base and sides. The labia are entire when young but may become weakly striate (grooved) as they mature. The disc is typically closed, only rarely exposing a narrow slit, and is dark reddish brown and lacks pruina.

In cross-section, the excipulum is strongly carbonized, measuring about 100–110 μm thick at the sides and 50–80 μm at the base. The hymenium is clear and tall (about 300–310 μm), staining pale blue in iodine, and the hypothecium is colourless (about 20–25 μm thick). Asci contain eight spores. The ascospores are muriform (multichambered), becoming pale brown at maturity, with 3–4 longitudinal and 2–3 transverse septa, and measure about 15–18 × 8–10 μm; they are iodine negative. No secondary metabolites were detected by thin-layer chromatography.

== Habitat and distribution ==
Halegrapha yakushimensis is known only from Yakushima Island in southern Japan. It has been collected in the Yodogawa area at elevations of about 1,400–1,500 m, where it grows over the moss Haplohymenium sieboldii on the base of a maple trunk and may spread onto nearby bark. Additional collections cited in the protologue are from the type locality and its immediate neighbourhood (including around Yodogawa Hut).
