= Topeliopsis acutispora =

Scientific classification
- Domain: Eukaryota
- Kingdom: Fungi
- Division: Ascomycota
- Class: Lecanoromycetes
- Order: Graphidales
- Family: Graphidaceae
- Genus: Topeliopsis
- Species: T. acutispora

Binomial name
- Topeliopsis acutispora Kalb (2001)

Species of lichen

Topeliopsis acutispora is a species of crustose lichen in the family Graphidaceae. It is found in New South Wales and southern Queensland (Australia), where it grows on bryophytes (i.e., mosses or liverworts).

== Taxonomy ==
The lichen was formally described by lichenologist Klaus Kalb in 2001. The type specimen was collected from Cunninghams Gap in a cool temperate rainforest at an altitude of about 750 m (2,460 ft). The species epithet refers to the acute, or "pointy", shape of its spores.

== Description ==
The lichen has a thin, whitish-grey to greenish-grey, effuse (spread-out) thallus. Its apothecia are more or less spherical to barrel-shaped, measuring 0.4–0.7 mm in diameter. The pale pink excipulum, initially closed, later opens via a ragged pore (ostiole). Ascospores typically number eight per ascus (sometimes only four are present), and are hyaline, halonate, and measure 90–130 by 9–12 μm.

Topeliopsis decorticans appears to be morphologically identical to T. acutispora; the two species are distinguished by major differences in their ascospores, including shape, size, septation, and number per ascus.
