= Halegrapha floridana =

Scientific classification
- Kingdom: Fungi
- Division: Ascomycota
- Class: Lecanoromycetes
- Order: Graphidales
- Family: Graphidaceae
- Genus: Halegrapha
- Species: H. floridana

Binomial name
- Halegrapha floridana Common & Lücking (2011)

Species of lichen-forming fungus

Halegrapha floridana is a species of script lichen in the family Graphidaceae. It forms a thin, yellowish-white crust on tree bark and produces black, elongated, slit-like fruiting bodies. The species is known only from an old-growth cypress swamp in southern Florida.

== Taxonomy ==
Halegrapha floridana was formally described as a new species in 2011 by Ralph S. Common and Robert Lücking, in the same paper that introduced the genus Halegrapha in the family Graphidaceae. The type was collected in Fakahatchee Strand Preserve State Park (Big Cypress Bend) in April 1997.

In that treatment, Halegrapha was described as an unusual mix of characters: it looks much like Graphis in its black, strongly carbonized, slit-like fruiting bodies and a pale, crystal-encrusted thallus, but it matches Phaeographis and related genera in its hymenial structure and in producing brown, transversely septate spores. Molecular data available for the genus placed it within the broader Phaeographis lineage, while remaining distinct from the genera recognized there at the time. The authors considered H. floridana most similar to H. kenyana, but separated it by a more thickly carbonized (blackened) excipulum at the base of the lirellae, an inspersed hymenium (containing fine granules), and the absence of detectable lichen substances. They also cautioned that it should not be confused with superficially similar species of Leiorreuma.

== Description ==
Halegrapha floridana is a bark-dwelling crustose lichen that forms a thin, continuous thallus about 1–2 cm (0.4–0.8 in) across and 50–100 μm thick. Its surface is uneven and yellowish white, without a distinct prothallus. In cross-section, the upper cortex is cartilaginous, with an irregular photobiont layer and conspicuous clusters of crystals in the thallus.

The fruiting bodies are flexuose lirellae (elongate, slit-like apothecia) that are immersed to partly erupting from the thallus, typically unbranched or only sparsely branched. They are about 1–2 mm long, with a concealed disc and black, striate (grooved) labia. The striae appear as thin, pale gray-brown lines, and a white thalline margin is present along the sides. The excipulum is bowl-shaped and completely carbonized, and the hymenium is colorless but inspersed. The asci contain eight brown, 3-septate ascospores measuring about 11–14 × 5–6 μm, usually with a slightly tapering distal end. No lichen substances were detected by thin-layer chromatography.

== Habitat and distribution ==
Halegrapha floridana is known only from Florida, USA, where it was collected in Collier County at Fakahatchee Strand Preserve State Park (Big Cypress Bend). The type collection came from an old-growth cypress swamp, where it was found growing on bark. The original description was based on a small collection, and no additional localities were reported in that treatment.
