= Halegrapha intergrapha =

Scientific classification
- Kingdom: Fungi
- Division: Ascomycota
- Class: Lecanoromycetes
- Order: Graphidales
- Family: Graphidaceae
- Genus: Halegrapha
- Species: H. intergrapha

Binomial name
- Halegrapha intergrapha Hale ex Lücking (2011)

Species of lichen-forming fungus

Halegrapha intergrapha is a species of bark-dwelling script lichen in the family Graphidaceae. It forms a thin, whitish-grey crust on tree bark and produces black, branching, slit-like fruiting bodies. The species is known from lowland rainforests in Malaysia, including sites in Peninsular Malaysia and Borneo.

== Taxonomy ==
Halegrapha intergrapha was formally described in 2011 by Robert Lücking, based on material collected in Malaysia by the American lichenologist Mason Hale in 1965. In the same work, the authors introduced the genus Halegrapha (family Graphidaceae), and they noted that Hale had recognized this distinctive group but did not have time to publish it himself.

The specific epithet intergrapha refers to the lichen's "in-between" appearance: it combines the outward look of typical Graphis (black, strongly carbonized lirellae on a pale, crystal-rich thallus) with internal features more typical of Phaeographis and relatives, such as a Phaeographis-type hymenium and brown, septate spores. Hale initially intended to describe the species in Phaeographis because of its spore type, and the later authors retained his unpublished epithet when they formally described it.

== Description ==
Halegrapha intergrapha is a bark-dwelling crustose lichen that forms a thin, continuous thallus, white to grey, typically about 1–5 cm across and 30–60 μm thick. The surface is smooth to somewhat uneven and lacks a prothallus. In section, the thallus has a cartilaginous upper cortex, an irregular algal layer, and conspicuous clusters of crystals.

The black lirellae are numerous and often densely branched, breaking through the thallus surface; the disc is concealed and the labia remain entire. The excipulum is carbonized mainly in the upper half (usually not reaching the base). The hymenium is colourless but inspersed, and the asci contain eight brown, thick-walled ascospores that are 7–9-septate and measure about 20–32 × 10–12 μm; the spores are oblong-ellipsoid with rounded ends. No lichen substances were detected by thin-layer chromatography.

== Habitat and distribution ==
Halegrapha intergrapha is known from Malaysia, with collections from both Peninsular Malaysia (Selangor) and Borneo (Sabah and Sarawak). It is corticolous (growing on bark) and has been reported from lowland dipterocarp forest settings ranging from sea level to about 300 m elevation, including sites described as logging areas within otherwise virgin forest and virgin peat dipterocarp forest. The published records are based on a small number of collections made in 1965, and no wider ecological range was documented in the original description beyond these Malaysian localities and forest types.
