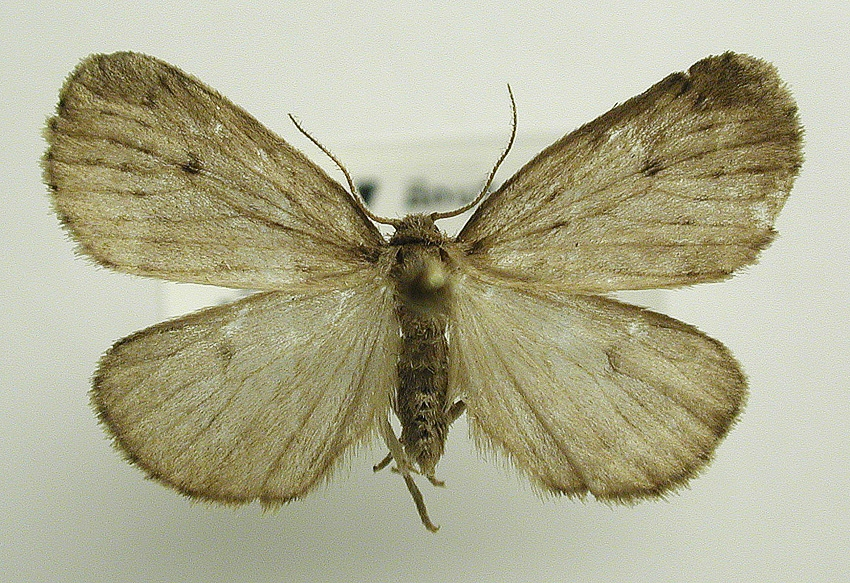

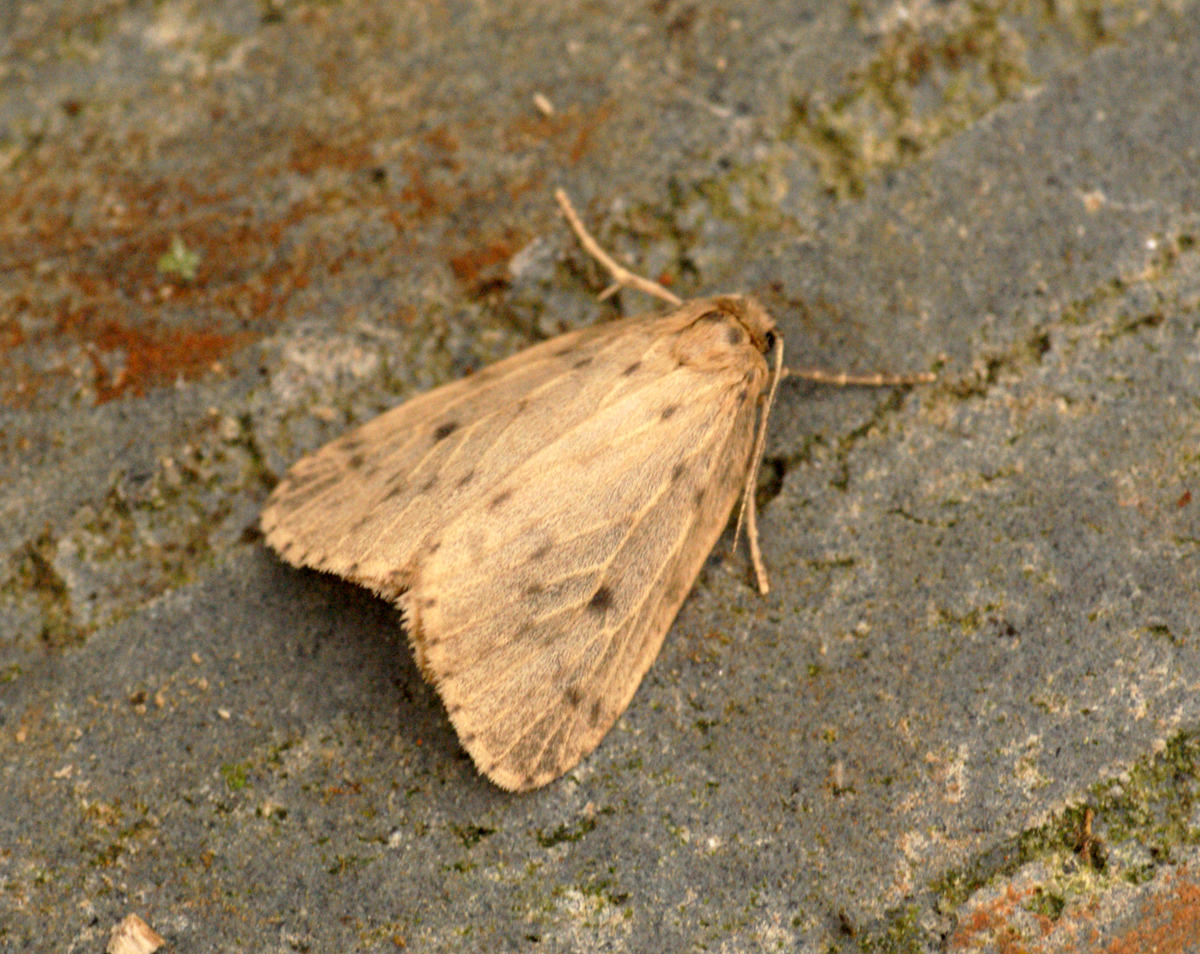

Scientific classification
- Domain: Eukaryota
- Kingdom: Animalia
- Phylum: Arthropoda
- Class: Insecta
- Order: Lepidoptera
- Superfamily: Noctuoidea
- Family: Erebidae
- Subfamily: Arctiinae
- Genus: Thumatha
- Species: T. senex

Binomial name
- Thumatha senex (Hübner, 1808)

Synonyms
- Bombyx senex Hübner, [1808]; Nudaria rotunda Haworth, 1809; Comacla senex; Comacla senex karvajszkyi Diószeghy, 1923

= Thumatha senex =

Species of moth

Thumatha senex, the round-winged muslin, is a moth of the family Erebidae. It is found in northern and central Europe, the Alps, northern Asia Minor, the Crimea and south-western Siberia.

== Technical description and variation ==
The wingspan is 15–20 mm. Not unlike Nudaria mundana ( mundana has less-rounded forewings and a more transparent appearance, less obvious spots). The central spot at the apex of the cell distinct; a larger shadowy spot at the middle of the costa, and before the marginal area of the forewing a row of spots which are especially distinct in the costal region. Another curved row of spots bounds the basal third of the forewing.

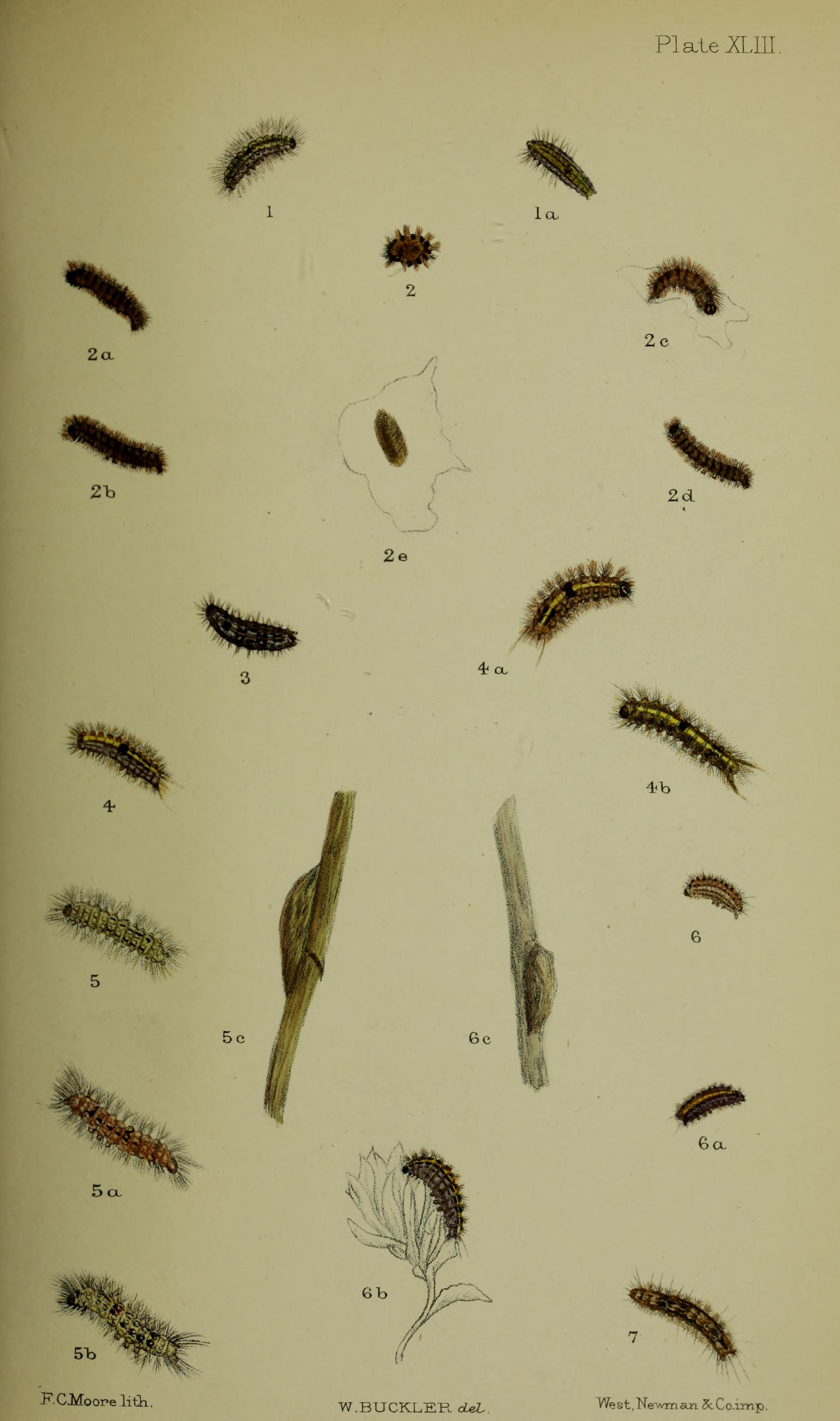
Figs. 2, 2a, 2b, 2c, 2d larvae after last moult 2 e cocoon or pupa case

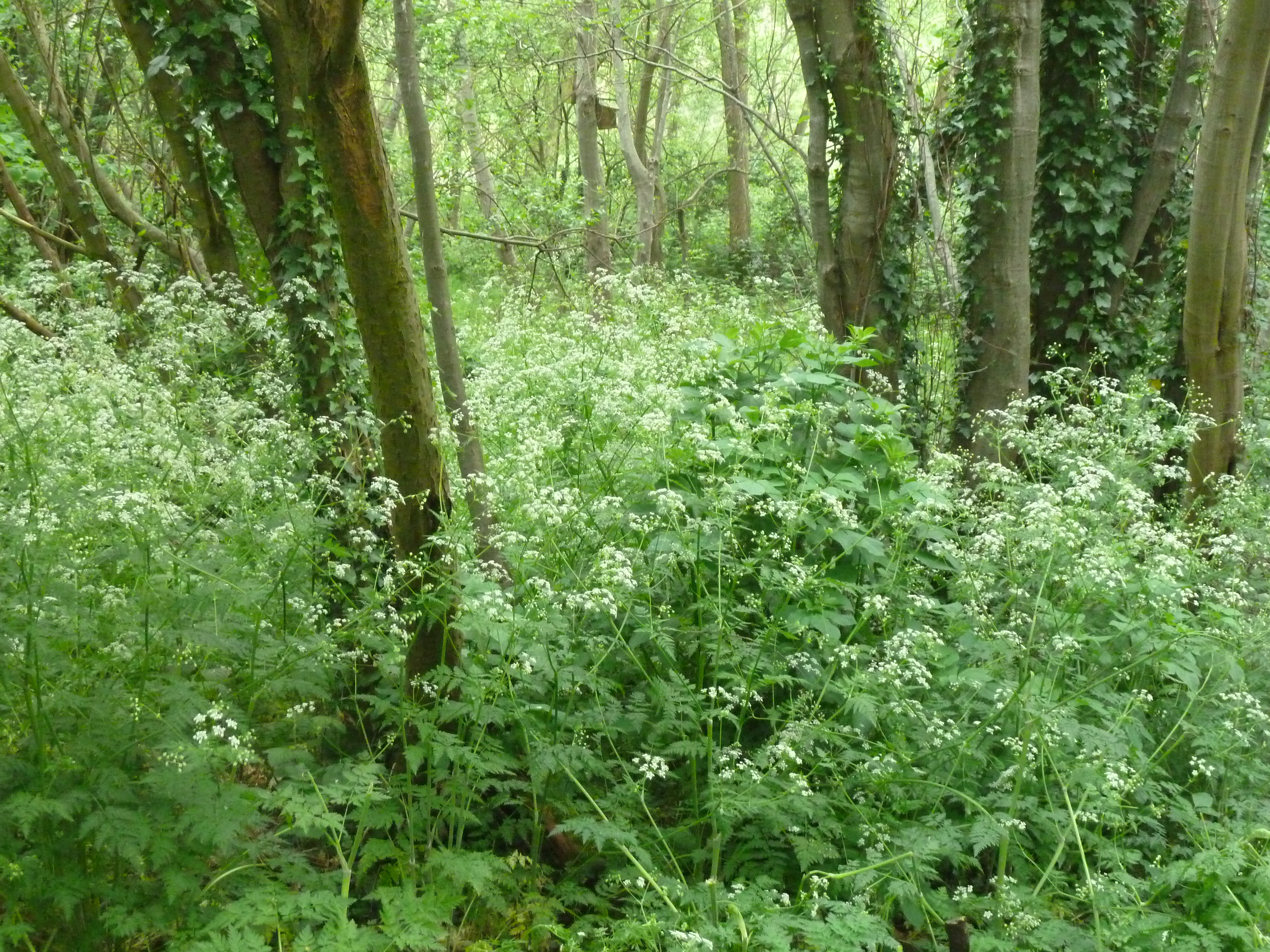
Habitat in Ireland

== Biology ==
Adults are on wing from mid-June to mid-August in one generation.

Egg round, yellow. Larva ashy grey, very hairy, with black head. The larvae feed on lichen (especially Peltigera canina) and mosses. Pupa stumpy, dark brown, in a dense hairy cocoon.

The moths fly on damp meadows, and are not rare in their flight-places; they come to the light at night.
