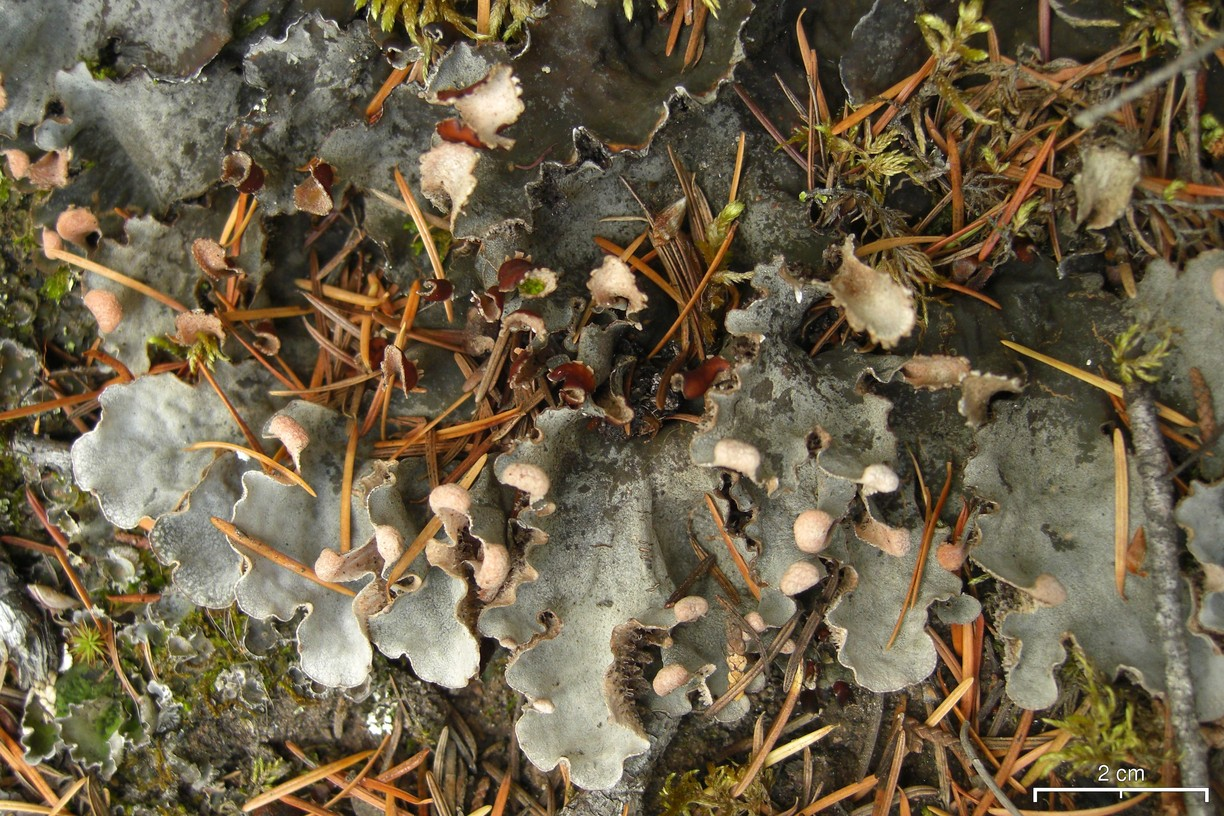
- in Wells Gray Provincial Park, British Columbia, Canada; scale bar= 2 centimetres

Conservation status
- Apparently Secure (NatureServe)

Scientific classification
- Kingdom: Fungi
- Division: Ascomycota
- Class: Lecanoromycetes
- Order: Peltigerales
- Family: Peltigeraceae
- Genus: Peltigera
- Species: P. retifoveata

Binomial name
- Peltigera retifoveata Vitik. (1985)

= Peltigera retifoveata =

Species of lichen

Peltigera retifoveata is a species of foliose lichen in the family Peltigeraceae. It is found in Scandinavia, western Eurasia and western North America, where it grows on the ground and amongst mosses.

== Taxonomy ==
Because of its tomentose thallus surface texture, Peltigera retifoveata is a member of the species complex centred around Peltigera canina. It was formally described as a new species in 1985 by the Finnish lichenologist Orvo Vitikainen. The type specimen was collected by Vitikainen from Juuma (Kuusamo, Finland) at an elevation of 180 m (590 ft), where it was found growing on the ground among mosses. One vernacular name used in North America is "sponge pelt".

== Description ==
The thallus of P. retifoveata grows up to about 20 cm (8 in) in diameter, comprising individual lobes that are about 10 cm (4 in) long and 1–2 cm (0.4–0.8 in) wide. The thallus surface is thickly tomentose near the margins, but becomes smoother (glabrous near the centre. The thallus underside features thick, pale, tomentose veins, with white and pit-like interstices. The rhizines (root-like attachment structures) are dark brown to black and up to about 7 long; they are typically either unbranched or grouped in bundles. The apothecia (fruiting bodies) are 5–7 mm in diameter with margins turned upward.

== Habitat and distribution ==
Peltigera retifoveata has a circumpolar distribution. Although originally described from Finnish collections, it is uncommon in Europe, having been recorded from only a few locations in Scandinavia. There are also records from the Russian Far East and Siberia. The lichen is more common in northern North America, with a range extending from subarctic regions (Alaska, Yukon, and the Northwest Territories, and including several western Canadian provinces: British Columbia, Alberta, and Manitoba. The southern extent of its North American range reaches Washington. It grows on the ground, and amongst or on top of mosses in boreal forests; in Alaska, it has been found growing in moist tundra. Associated mosses include Pleurozium schreberi, Hylocomium sklendens, Ptilium crista-castrensis, and species of Dicranum. Other lichen species that are often found with Peltigera retifoveata are its relatives P. aphthosa, P. leucophlebia, and P. canina.
