= Phaeographis salazinica =

Scientific classification
- Domain: Eukaryota
- Kingdom: Fungi
- Division: Ascomycota
- Class: Lecanoromycetes
- Order: Graphidales
- Family: Graphidaceae
- Genus: Phaeographis
- Species: P. salazinica

Binomial name
- Phaeographis salazinica (A.W.Archer) A.W.Archer (2007)

Synonyms
- Phaeographina salazinica A.W.Archer (2003)

Species of lichen

Phaeographis salazinica is a species of script lichen in the family Graphidaceae. Found in the Solomon Islands, the lichen was first described as a new species in 2003 by Australian lichenologist Alan W. Archer. He named it Phaeographis salazinica, with the specific epithet referring to the presence of the compound salazinic acid as its major secondary compound. The lichen also contains trace amounts of consalazinic acid, connorstictic acid, norstictic acid, subnorstictic acid, protocetraric acid, and methyl norstictate. The type specimen was collected near Tatamba on Tanabuli Island (part of Santa Isabel Island). The main morphological characteristics of Phaeographis salazinica are the conspicuous lirellae, and the large brown muriform ascospores (typically measuring 150–180 μm long by 35–50 μm wide). Archer transferred the taxon to the genus Phaeographis in 2007.
