= Phaeographis delicatula =

Scientific classification
- Kingdom: Fungi
- Division: Ascomycota
- Class: Lecanoromycetes
- Order: Graphidales
- Family: Graphidaceae
- Genus: Phaeographis
- Species: P. delicatula

Binomial name
- Phaeographis delicatula Common & Lücking (2011)

Species of lichen-forming fungus

Phaeographis delicatula is a species of crustose lichen in the family Graphidaceae. It is known from subtropical Florida and Brazil, where it grows on the branches of hardwoods. It is characterized by delicate lirellae (slit-like fruiting bodies) in dense clusters that often branch in a star-like pattern. Chemically, its main lichen substance is stictic acid.

== Taxonomy ==
Phaeographis delicatula was described as a new species in 2011 by Ralph Common and Robert Lücking. The holotype (the single specimen the name is based on; Common 7367C) was collected in April 1997 in Fakahatchee Strand Preserve State Park (Collier County, Florida), along the K2 trail among royal palms in a second-growth area, and is kept in the herbarium of the Michigan State University Museum (MSC).

The specific epithet delicatula refers to the species' delicate lirellae. The species is placed in the Phaeographis intricans aggregate, a group defined by a clear hymenium, clustered lirellae, and small ascospores. It differs from most close relatives in containing norstictic acid rather than stictic acid.

== Description ==
The thallus is corticolous (growing on bark), forming a continuous crust 1–3 cm (0.4–1.2 in) across and about 50–100 micrometers (μm) thick.Its surface is uneven, with small wart-like bumps (warty to verrucose), and ranges from pale yellow-gray to olive-yellow. The photobiont (the photosynthetic partner) is a Trentepohlia-type green alga.

The lirellae are flexuose (wavy) and form dense clusters, but these clusters but these clusters do not form a pseudostroma (a stroma made of both thallus tissue and bits of host tissue). The lirellae are often stellately branched and erumpent. Individual lirellae are typically 1–3 mm long (sometimes breaking into shorter segments), about 0.1 mm wide, and 0.12–0.15 mm high. The disk (the exposed surface) is chocolate-brown and may have a thin gray pruina (frosty-looking coating); the labia (lirellae "lips") are indistinct and dark brown, with a thin, yellow-white thalline margin. The disk is exposed and chocolate-brown and may carry a thin gray pruina, while the labia are indistinct and dark brown, with a thin, yellow-white thalline margin.

Under the microscope, the excipulum is divergent and dark brown (about 10–20 μm wide), and the hymenium is clear and about 50–60 μm high. The asci are fusiform to clavate (about 45–55 × 10–12 μm) and produce eight oblong ascospores with three septa (internal cross-walls) measuring about 13–18 × 5–7 μm. The spores are I+ (staining wine-red to red-purple in an iodine test). Chemically, the thallus contains stictic acid as its major secondary metabolite with a trace of constictic acid. In section, the K test (potassium hydroxide) is positive (K+), producing a yellow efflux that is visible under the microscope.

== Habitat and distribution ==
The species was originally known from three collections from Fakahatchee Strand Preserve State Park in southwestern Florida, where it was found on branches of hardwood. In their remarks, the authors contrasted it with Phaeographis flavescens, the only other species they cited as having stictic acid in this group, noting that P. flavescens has more robust, distinctly pruinose lirellae and larger, usually 5-septate ascospores. Phaeographis delicatula has since been documented in the lowland Amazon rainforest, preandean Amazon, and Yungas cloud forests of Bolivia.
