= Thumatha orientalis =

Scientific classification
- Kingdom: Animalia
- Phylum: Arthropoda
- Clade: Pancrustacea
- Class: Insecta
- Order: Lepidoptera
- Superfamily: Noctuoidea
- Family: Erebidae
- Subfamily: Arctiinae
- Genus: Thumatha
- Species: T. orientalis

Binomial name
- Thumatha orientalis Holloway, 2001

Species of moth

Thumatha orientalis is a moth in the family Erebidae first described by Jeremy Daniel Holloway in 2001. It is found in Sri Lanka and on Borneo. The habitat consists of lowland areas.

The length of the forewings is 5–6 mm. Adults are dark reddish brown.
