= Thumatha ochracea =

Scientific classification
- Domain: Eukaryota
- Kingdom: Animalia
- Phylum: Arthropoda
- Class: Insecta
- Order: Lepidoptera
- Superfamily: Noctuoidea
- Family: Erebidae
- Subfamily: Arctiinae
- Genus: Thumatha
- Species: T. ochracea

Binomial name
- Thumatha ochracea (Bremer, 1861)

Synonyms
- Nudaria ochracea Bremer, 1861

Species of moth

Thumatha ochracea is a moth in the family Erebidae first described by Otto Vasilievich Bremer in 1861. It is found in the Russian Far East (Middle Amur, Primorye) and Japan.
