= Thumatha kakamegae =

Scientific classification
- Domain: Eukaryota
- Kingdom: Animalia
- Phylum: Arthropoda
- Class: Insecta
- Order: Lepidoptera
- Superfamily: Noctuoidea
- Family: Erebidae
- Subfamily: Arctiinae
- Genus: Thumatha
- Species: T. kakamegae

Binomial name
- Thumatha kakamegae Kühne, 2007

Species of moth

Thumatha kakamegae is a moth in the family Erebidae. It was described by Lars Kühne in 2007. It is found in Kenya and Uganda.
