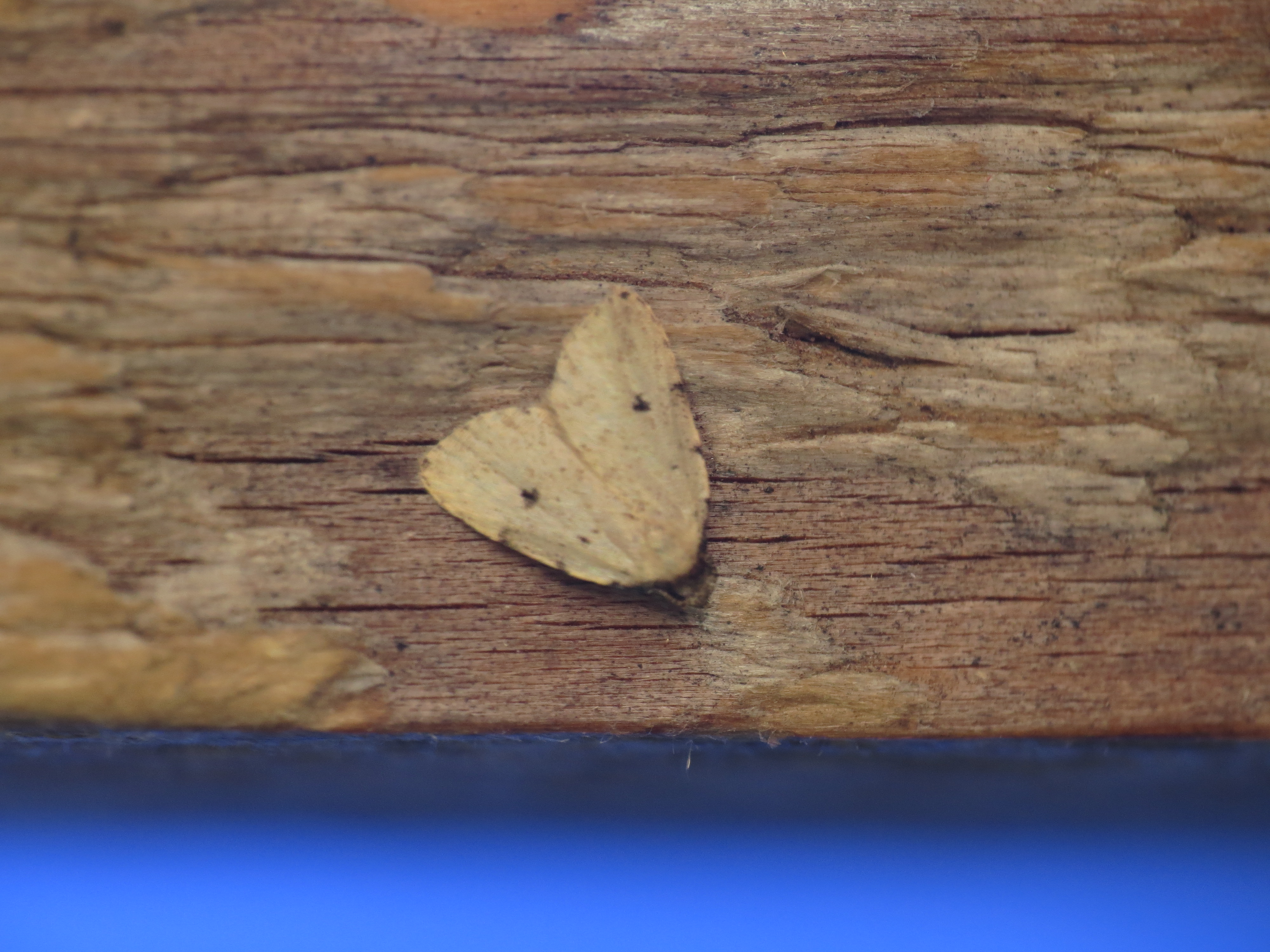
- Thumatha senex

Scientific classification
- Domain: Eukaryota
- Kingdom: Animalia
- Phylum: Arthropoda
- Class: Insecta
- Order: Lepidoptera
- Superfamily: Noctuoidea
- Family: Erebidae
- Subfamily: Arctiinae
- Subtribe: Nudariina
- Genus: Thumatha; Walker, 1866

Synonyms
- Pelobrochis Lucas, 1892; Dictenus Butler, [1897]; Nudaridia Hampson, 1900

= Thumatha =

Genus of moths

Thumatha is a genus of moths in the family Erebidae. The genus was erected by Francis Walker in 1866. Species are distributed in the Oriental and Australian regions.

== Description ==
Palpi porrect (extending forward) and slender. Antennae bipectinated (comb like on both sides) in male. The tibia has long spurs, and the forewings are broad and short. Veins 3 to 5 arise closer to the end of the cell, and vein 6 from upper angle. Veins 7 to 9 stalked and vein 11 anastomosing (fusing) with vein 12. In hindwings, veins 3 and 4 stalked, vein 5 from angle of cell, veins 6 and 7 stalked, and vein 8 from beyond the middle of cell.

== Species ==
- Thumatha brunnea Kühne, 2007
- Thumatha fuscescens Walker, 1866
  - Thumatha fuscescens africana - Kühne, 2007
  - Thumatha fuscescens fuscescens
- Thumatha kakamegae Kühne, 2007
- Thumatha inconstans (Butler, [1897])
- Thumatha infantula (Saalmüller, 1880)
- Thumatha lunaris Durante, 2007
- Thumatha monochroa Zolotuhin, 1996
- Thumatha muscula (Staudinger, 1887)
- Thumatha ochracea (Bremer, 1861)
- Thumatha orientalis Holloway, 2001
- Thumatha punctata Kühne, 2010
- Thumatha senex (Hübner, [1808])
