= Phaeographis nardiensis =

Scientific classification
- Domain: Eukaryota
- Kingdom: Fungi
- Division: Ascomycota
- Class: Lecanoromycetes
- Order: Graphidales
- Family: Graphidaceae
- Genus: Phaeographis
- Species: P. nardiensis

Binomial name
- Phaeographis nardiensis A.W.Archer (2001)

Species of lichen

Phaeographis nardiensis is a species of corticolous (bark-dwelling) crustose lichen in the family Graphidaceae. Found in Australia and Thailand, it was formally described as a new species in 2001. It favours the subtropical to temperate rainforest habitats that are characteristic of eastern Australia's coastal ranges.

== Taxonomy ==
Phaeographis nardiensis was first described as a new species in 2001 by Alan W. Archer. The species epithet nardiensis refers to Mount Nardi in New South Wales, Australia, where the type specimen was collected.

This species is related to Phaeographis dendritica but differs in having smaller spores and lacking a proper exciple (the protective outer layer of the fruiting body). It also bears some resemblance to Phaeographis exaltata, but can be distinguished by its chemical composition and structural characteristics.

== Description ==
Phaeographis nardiensis has a thin, pale fawn-coloured thallus (the main body of the lichen) that grows on bark (corticolous). The surface of the thallus is smooth and shiny. The reproductive structures (apothecia) are distinctive and conspicuous. They are black, open, lirelliform (elongated and groove-like) structures measuring 0.25–0.5 mm in width. These lirellae have a noticeable thalline margin (an edge formed from the lichen's main body) and are subsessile to sessile (attached directly or nearly directly to the surface). A key characteristic of this species is how these lirellae form intricate branching clusters measuring 2–5 mm in diameter.

Unlike some related species, P. nardiensis lacks a proper exciple (the protective rim around the spore-producing layer). The hymenium (spore-producing layer) is 125–175 μm tall. The epithecium (the upper surface of the hymenium) is black with a fine white powdery coating (pruinose).

Each ascus (spore sac) contains eight ascospores arranged in an irregular double row (biseriate). The spores are pale brown, measuring 28–36 μm in length and 7–9 μm in width, with 6–8 compartments (locules).

The chemistry of this lichen is characterized by the presence of norstictic acid, a secondary metabolite detectable with thin-layer chromatography.

== Habitat and distribution ==
Phaeographis nardiensis was originally considered endemic to Australia, with its known distribution there limited to Queensland and northern New South Wales. The type specimen was collected at Mount Nardi, about 28 km north of Lismore, New South Wales, at an elevation of 800 m, growing on a fallen branch. Other documented locations include the Tully Falls Road (8 km southeast of Ravenshoe in Queensland) and Dorrigo National Park in New South Wales. P. nardiensis is one of 23 Phaeographis species that have been reported from Australia of as 2005. In 2010, it was recorded from Thailand, and is now included on the checklist of lichens occurring in that country.
