= Thumatha lunaris =

Scientific classification
- Domain: Eukaryota
- Kingdom: Animalia
- Phylum: Arthropoda
- Class: Insecta
- Order: Lepidoptera
- Superfamily: Noctuoidea
- Family: Erebidae
- Subfamily: Arctiinae
- Genus: Thumatha
- Species: T. lunaris

Binomial name
- Thumatha lunaris Durante, 2007

Species of moth

Thumatha lunaris is a moth in the family Erebidae. It was described by Antonio Durante in 2007. It is found in Niger.
