= Thumatha infantula =

Scientific classification
- Kingdom: Animalia
- Phylum: Arthropoda
- Clade: Pancrustacea
- Class: Insecta
- Order: Lepidoptera
- Superfamily: Noctuoidea
- Family: Erebidae
- Subfamily: Arctiinae
- Genus: Thumatha
- Species: T. infantula

Binomial name
- Thumatha infantula (Saalmüller, 1880)

Synonyms
- Nudaria infantula Saalmüller, 1880

Species of moth

Thumatha infantula is a moth in the family Erebidae. It was described by Saalmüller in 1880. It is found in Madagascar.
