= Thumatha monochroa =

Scientific classification
- Kingdom: Animalia
- Phylum: Arthropoda
- Clade: Pancrustacea
- Class: Insecta
- Order: Lepidoptera
- Superfamily: Noctuoidea
- Family: Erebidae
- Subfamily: Arctiinae
- Genus: Thumatha
- Species: T. monochroa

Binomial name
- Thumatha monochroa Zolotuhin, 1996

Species of moth

Thumatha monochroa is a moth in the family Erebidae first described by Vadim V. Zolotuhin in 1996. It is found in south-eastern Kazakhstan.
