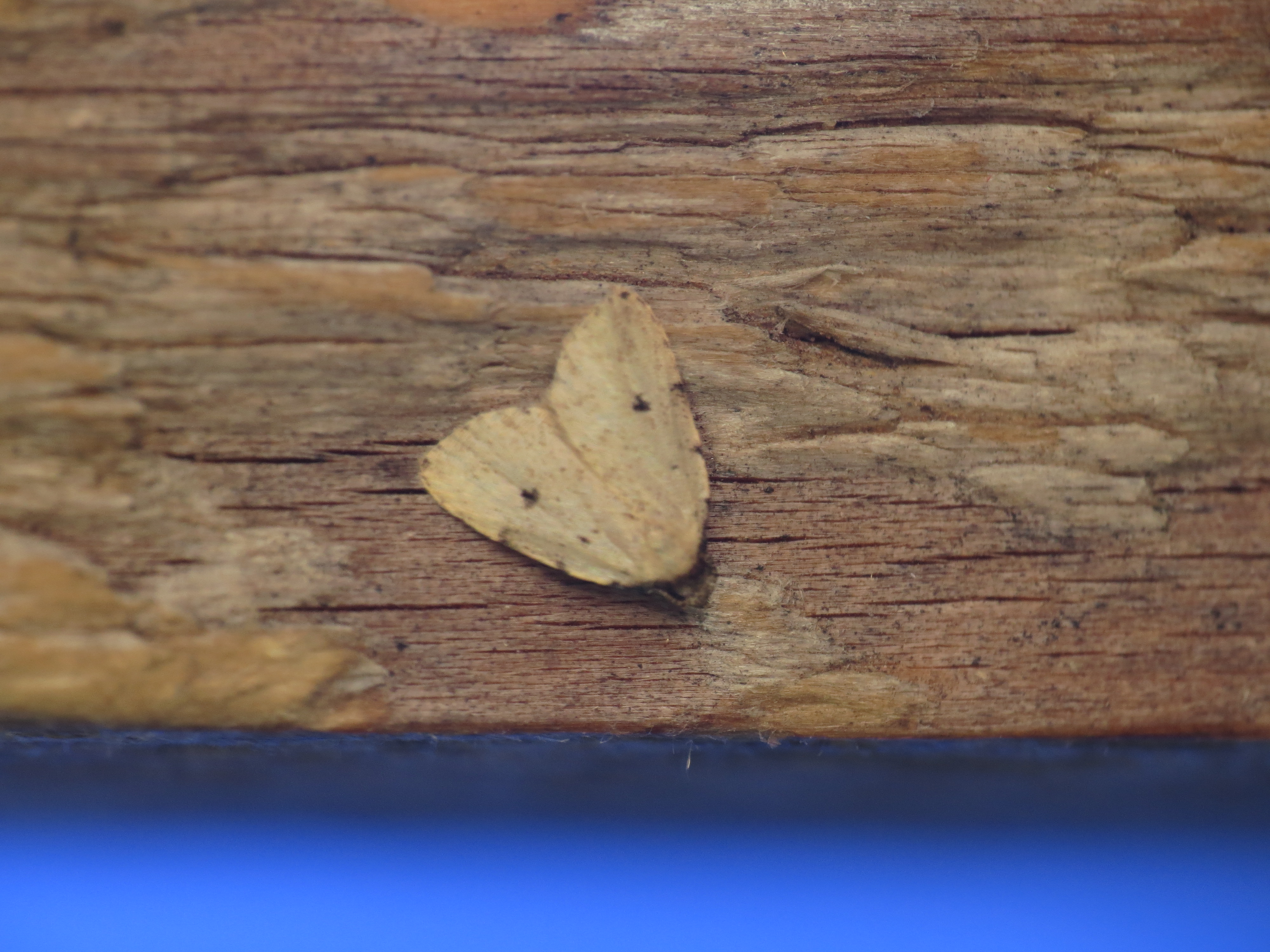

Scientific classification
- Kingdom: Animalia
- Phylum: Arthropoda
- Clade: Pancrustacea
- Class: Insecta
- Order: Lepidoptera
- Superfamily: Noctuoidea
- Family: Erebidae
- Subfamily: Arctiinae
- Genus: Thumatha
- Species: T. fuscescens

Binomial name
- Thumatha fuscescens Walker, 1866

Synonyms
- Scaeodora rava Lucas, 1890; Thumatha rava

= Thumatha fuscescens =

Species of moth

Thumatha fuscescens is a moth of the family Erebidae first described by Francis Walker in 1866. It is found in Australia, South-East Asia, India, Sri Lanka, the Comoros, Réunion, Madagascar, and Gabon.

== Description ==
The species wingspan is 16 millimetres (0.63 in). The male has a pale reddish-brownish body. Forewings possess traces of antemedial and postmedial waved lines. There is a black spot at end of the cell and a spot on the costa before apex. Sub-marginal and marginal specks series present.

The larva is known to feed on lichens and mosses.

== Subspecies ==
- Thumatha fuscescens fuscescens (south-east Asia, Australia)
- Thumatha fuscescens africana Kühne, 2007 (Africa)
