= Phaeographis striata =

Scientific classification
- Domain: Eukaryota
- Kingdom: Fungi
- Division: Ascomycota
- Class: Lecanoromycetes
- Order: Graphidales
- Family: Graphidaceae
- Genus: Phaeographis
- Species: P. striata

Binomial name
- Phaeographis striata Bungartz (2010)

Species of lichen

Phaeographis striata is a species of script lichen in the family Graphidaceae, endemic to the Galápagos Islands. It is characterized by its inconspicuous thallus and striate (grooved) thalline margins of the lirellae. The species is found in the lower transition zone, growing on columnar cacti and other plants native to the region.

== Taxonomy ==
Phaeographis striata was first described by Frank Bungartz in 2007, who designated a holotype collected from San Cristóbal Island, Cerro Partido in the Galápagos Islands. The species is similar to Fissurina columbina but has apical carbonized excipules and brown ascospores. The name Phaeographis striata refers to the striate (furrowed) thalline margins of the lirellae.

== Description ==
The thallus of Phaeographis striata is thin, inconspicuous, and almost entirely embedded in the substrate. Its surface is smooth, not pruinose, and of the same color as the substrate or slightly darker and more yellowish-orange. The apothecia are immersed, lirellate, and initially fissurine, with thin, elongate, and moderately to sparsely branched lirellae. The labia are thin and narrow, surrounded by a striate thalline margin composed of several papery thallus layers. The disc is initially fissurine but soon expands, becoming immersed, flattened, blackened, and covered by farinose whitish pruina. The exciple is thin, with apical carbonisation and an aeruginose pigment that fades laterally and is unpigmented basally. The hymenium is translucent, with pale gray ascospores that soon turn brown, measuring 17–23 by 7–9 μm and usually containing 4–6 cells.

== Habitat and distribution ==
Phaeographis striata is currently known only from the Galápagos Islands, specifically from the Alcedo Volcano on Isabela Island and San Cristóbal Island. It is considered endemic to the region and grows in the lower transition zone (an ecological region where vegetation and habitats transition between the arid lowlands and the humid highlands), on the columnar cactus Jasminocereus thouarsii and the tree Bursera graveolens.
