= Thumatha muscula =

Scientific classification
- Domain: Eukaryota
- Kingdom: Animalia
- Phylum: Arthropoda
- Class: Insecta
- Order: Lepidoptera
- Superfamily: Noctuoidea
- Family: Erebidae
- Subfamily: Arctiinae
- Genus: Thumatha
- Species: T. muscula

Binomial name
- Thumatha muscula (Staudinger, 1887)

Synonyms
- Nudaria muscula Staudinger, 1887; Nudaridia muscula

Species of moth

Thumatha muscula is a moth in the family Erebidae first described by Otto Staudinger in 1887. It is found in the Russian Far East (Middle Amur, Primorye) and Japan.
