= Phaeographis tuberculifera =

Scientific classification
- Kingdom: Fungi
- Division: Ascomycota
- Class: Lecanoromycetes
- Order: Graphidales
- Family: Graphidaceae
- Genus: Phaeographis
- Species: P. tuberculifera

Binomial name
- Phaeographis tuberculifera A.W.Archer (2001)
- Holotype: Kutini-Payamu (Iron Range) National Park, Queensland, Australia

Species of lichen

Phaeographis tuberculifera is a species of saxicolous (rock-dwelling) crustose lichen in the family Graphidaceae, first described in 2001. This lichen features a pale greenish-brown thallus with a characteristically bumpy or warty surface, and is exclusively found growing on rock surfaces in northern Queensland, Australia. It is distinguished from related species by its warty appearance, its elongated black reproductive structures that are partially hidden within the lichen's main body, and its small, four-chambered spores. P. tuberculifera appears to be endemic to Australia, with its known distribution limited to its original collection site.

== Taxonomy ==
Phaeographis tuberculifera was formally described as a new species in 2001 by the lichenologist Alan W. Archer. This Australian lichen is distinguished from the related species Phaeographis eludens by its tuberculate (warty or bumpy) thallus and its lirellae (reproductive structures) that are covered by the thallus tissue.

The species was first discovered in Queensland, Australia, at Tozers Gap in the Kutini-Payamu (Iron Range) National Park. The type specimen was collected by Heinar Streimann in October 1995, growing on a semi-exposed sloping boulder at an elevation of 120 metres.

== Description ==
Phaeographis tuberculifera has a distinctive pale greenish-brown thallus (the main body of the lichen) that is relatively thick, measuring between 0.5 and 2 mm. Unlike many lichens that grow on tree bark, this species is saxicolous, meaning it grows on rock surfaces. One of its most notable features is its conspicuously tuberculate (bumpy or warty) surface, which is smooth but has a dull rather than shiny appearance.

The reproductive structures (apothecia) of this lichen are lirelliform, meaning they are elongated and groove-like. These black lirellae are rather inconspicuous as they are immersed within the thallus tissue. They are slightly open and can be straight, curved, sinuous (wavy), or branched, measuring 1–2 mm in length and only 0.05–0.1 mm in width. The lirellae have a thin white margin formed from the thallus tissue, but lack a proper exciple (the specialised tissue that normally forms a protective rim around the spore-producing layer in many lichens).

The hymenium (the spore-producing layer) is 100–120 μm in height. Each ascus (spore sac) contains eight ascospores arranged in a single row (uniseriate). The spores are rounded cylindrical in shape, pale brown in colour, and measure 10–12 μm in length and 4–5 μm in width. Each spore has four compartments (locules). Chemical analysis has found no lichen products present in this species, which is another distinguishing characteristic.

== Habitat and distribution ==
Phaeographis tuberculifera is endemic to Australia, with its known distribution limited to northern Queensland. At the time of its initial publication, it had only been documented from its type locality at Tozers Gap in the Iron Range National Park, about 29 kilometres southwest of Cape Weymouth.

Other Australian rock-dwelling species in the genus Phaeographis, such as P. eludens and P. hypoglaucoides, have larger ascospores and continuous (rather than tuberculate) thalli. P. nardiensis is one of 23 Phaeographis species that have been reported from Australia of as 2005.
