= Halegrapha kenyana =

Scientific classification
- Kingdom: Fungi
- Division: Ascomycota
- Class: Lecanoromycetes
- Order: Graphidales
- Family: Graphidaceae
- Genus: Halegrapha
- Species: H. kenyana

Binomial name
- Halegrapha kenyana Kalb & Lücking (2011)

Species of lichen-forming fungus

Halegrapha kenyana is a species of script lichen in the family Graphidaceae. It forms a thin, yellowish-white crust on tree bark and produces dense, black, slit-like fruiting bodies. The species is known only from the Shimba Hills in coastal Kenya.

== Taxonomy ==
Halegrapha kenyana was formally described in 2011 by Klaus Kalb and Robert Lücking, in the same work that established the genus Halegrapha for a small group of tropical, bark-dwelling species with a Graphis-like appearance but brown, septate spores typical of the Phaeographis lineage.

In the original description, the species was described as having been initially labelled as "Graphis / Phaeographis", alluding to its intermediate set of characters. The authors considered it most similar to H. floridana, but separated it by its clear (non-inspersed) hymenium, a thin, bowl-shaped excipulum, and the presence of stictic acid chemistry.

== Description ==
Halegrapha kenyana forms a thin, continuous thallus on bark, usually 1–3 cm across and about 50–80 μm thick. The surface is smooth to uneven and yellowish white, without a distinct prothallus. In cross-section, the thallus has a cartilaginous upper cortex, an irregular photobiont layer, and conspicuous clusters of crystals.

The fruiting bodies are lirellae (elongate, slit-like apothecia) that are dense, flexuose, and irregularly branched. They are immersed to erumpent, with the base set well below the thallus surface and a white lateral thalline margin. The disc is concealed and the black labia become striate with age. Microscopically, the excipulum is bowl-shaped and completely carbonized (blackened), while the hymenium is colourless and clear; the asci contain eight brown ascospores, usually 3–5-septate, measuring about 13–18 × 5–7 μm. Thin-layer chromatography detected stictic acid as a major lichen product with constictic acid as a minor component (with K+ persistently yellow in microscope cross-sections).

== Habitat and distribution ==
Halegrapha kenyana is a corticolous (bark-dwelling) lichen known from coastal Kenya, where it was collected in the Shimba Hills (Kwale District) at 350 m elevation. In the original description, the species was reported only from the type collection, and no further localities or habitat details were provided beyond its occurrence on bark at the type locality.
