= Phaeographis xanthonica =

Scientific classification
- Kingdom: Fungi
- Division: Ascomycota
- Class: Lecanoromycetes
- Order: Graphidales
- Family: Graphidaceae
- Genus: Phaeographis
- Species: P. xanthonica

Binomial name
- Phaeographis xanthonica Kalb & Matthes-Leicht (2009)
- Holotype site: Itatiaia, Brazil

Species of lichen

Phaeographis xanthonica is a species of corticolous (bark-dwelling), crustose lichen in the family Graphidaceae. Found in Brazil, it was formally described as a new species in 2009 by Klaus Kalb and M. Matthes-Leicht. The species epithet refers to the presence of the xanthone substance lichexanthone. The type specimen was collected in Itatiaia (Serra da Mantiqueira, Rio de Janeiro) at an altitude of 1,750 m (5,740 ft). It has also been recorded from Costa Rica.

The thallus of Phaeographis xanthonica is smooth, matt, whitish-grey to whitish-beige, and lacks a prothallus. Its ascomata are lirelline in form, curved with tapered ends, and measure 0.5–4 mm long. The discs are black and bordered by a somewhat thick and split thalline margin. The ascospores have a transverse septum that divides it into four cells; their dimensions fall into the range 11–21 by 5–7 μm.
