= Halegrapha masoniana =

Scientific classification
- Kingdom: Fungi
- Division: Ascomycota
- Class: Lecanoromycetes
- Order: Graphidales
- Family: Graphidaceae
- Genus: Halegrapha
- Species: H. masoniana

Binomial name
- Halegrapha masoniana Weerakoon, Lücking & Lumbsch (2014)

Species of lichen-forming fungus

Halegrapha masoniana is a species of corticolous (bark-dwelling) crustose lichen in the family Graphidaceae. Found in Sri Lanka, it was formally described as a new species in 2014 by the lichenologists Gothamie Weerakoon, Robert Lücking, and Helge Thorsten Lumbsch. The type specimen was collected from Cottaganga Ella, in a montane forest at an altitude of 1,147 m (3,763 ft). It is only known to occur at the type locality. The specific epithet honours American lichenologist Mason Hale, "for his important contributions to lichenology in Sri Lanka".

The main characteristics of Halegrapha masoniana that distinguish it from other members of its genus include the inspersed hymenium, the presence of norstictic acid, and the relatively large ascospores, measuring 50–70 by 8–10 μm.
