= Halegrapha mucronata =

Scientific classification
- Kingdom: Fungi
- Division: Ascomycota
- Class: Lecanoromycetes
- Order: Graphidales
- Family: Graphidaceae
- Genus: Halegrapha
- Species: H. mucronata

Binomial name
- Halegrapha mucronata (Stirt.) Lücking (2011)

Synonyms
- List: Graphis mucronata Stirt. (1876); Phaeographis mucronata (Stirt.) Zahlbr. (1923); Platygramme mucronata (Stirt.) A.W.Archer (2006); Graphis aulacothecia C.Knight (1882); Phaeographis australiensis Müll.Arg. (1882); Phaeographis cinerascens Müll.Arg. (1882); Phaeographis inscripta Müll.Arg. (1882); Phaeographis subcompulsa Müll.Arg. (1882)

Species of lichen-forming fungus

Halegrapha mucronata is a species of bark-dwelling script lichen in the family Graphidaceae. It forms a whitish-grey crust on tree bark and produces dense, black, slit-like fruiting bodies. The species has a complex taxonomic history, having been placed in several different genera before being transferred to Halegrapha in 2011. It occurs in Australia and New Zealand, where it is common in coastal scrub and woodland.

== Taxonomy ==
Halegrapha mucronata was originally described from Australia in 1876 as Graphis mucronata by James Stirton, based on specimens collected on tree bark near the Riverina district. In the protologue, Stirton emphasised its very thin, pale thallus and black, sinuous lirellae, and he described the spores as becoming brown with age and ending in small terminal points; he also recorded a K− reaction for the thallus. The taxon was later transferred to Phaeographis and then to Platygramme by later authors. In their 2011 treatment of the new genus Halegrapha, Robert Lücking and coauthors recombined the species as Halegrapha mucronata, treating it as part of a small group that outwardly resembles Graphis but has hymenial and spore characters associated with the Phaeographis lineage.

Earlier work in Australia had already drawn attention to its mixed character set: when Alan Archer placed it in Platygramme, he remarked that its combination of traits was intermediate between Graphis and Phaeographis and that its generic placement was uncertain. The epithet mucronata refers to the spores, which bear small terminal appendages. In discussing the species concept, Lücking and colleagues compared a number of historical names and concluded that some type collections match H. mucronata closely, while other material is variable and may represent more than one species, leaving some synonymy unresolved.

== Description ==
Halegrapha mucronata is a bark-dwelling crustose lichen forming a continuous thallus that is typically white-grey, with a smooth to uneven surface and no prothallus. Thalli form diffuse patches up to about 10 cm wide that often fuse into extensive colonies; the thallus is typically about 30–120 μm thick. Calcium oxalate crystals are abundant, especially between the cortex and the photobiont layer. In section it has a firm, cartilaginous upper cortex, an uneven photobiont layer, and conspicuous clusters of crystals in the thallus.

The fruiting bodies are black lirellae that are dense and flexuose, usually only sparsely branched, and immersed to erumpent. The black lirellae are scattered to crowded, usually simple or only sparsely branched, and straight to sinuous; they are about 0.8–4 mm long and 0.2–0.3 mm wide, with a thin basal thalline margin and a usually concealed black disc. The disc is usually concealed but can be slightly exposed, and the lips (labia) are black and remain entire. Microscopically, the excipulum is carbonised mainly along the sides (sometimes converging beneath the hymenium), and the hymenium is colourless and clear (not inspersed). The asci produce eight brown ascospores. Ascospores are transversely 7–12-septate and (30–)34–57(–64) × 7–11(–11.5) μm; they begin hyaline, become pale brown, and may become deep brown and somewhat deformed with age. A hyaline mucronate extension about 2–5 μm long occurs at both ends, or sometimes only at the distal end. Thin-layer chromatography (TLC) detected norstictic acid as the major lichen substance (with connorstictic acid as a minor component), and thallus sections show a K+ (yellow) reaction that forms red needle-shaped crystals under the microscope. In Tasmanian material these acids are often present at very low concentrations, so K and P spot tests can be weak or unreliable. The red, needle-like crystals sometimes expected in K-treated sections are also often not seen, and TLC may be required to confirm the chemistry.

== Habitat and distribution ==
Halegrapha mucronata is corticolous, growing on bark. In Tasmania it is very common and widespread in coastal districts (including the Bass Strait islands), and it often becomes the dominant epiphyte in coastal scrub dominated by Acacia longifolia subsp. sophorae, where it can form extensive thalli alongside Lecanora flavopallida and Flavoparmelia rutidota. Inland it is less frequent, where it has been recorded on garden trees and in dry and wet sclerophyll forest and heathland, and it has been collected rarely from canopy branches in rainforest.

More broadly, the species is reported from Australia and New Zealand. In the 2011 revision that established Halegrapha, the nomenclatural types discussed for H. mucronata were from New South Wales, including collections from the Riverina district and the Nepean River area. In Tasmanian literature it has also been treated under the name Phaeographis australiensis.
