= Halegrapha chimaera =

Scientific classification
- Kingdom: Fungi
- Division: Ascomycota
- Class: Lecanoromycetes
- Order: Graphidales
- Family: Graphidaceae
- Genus: Halegrapha
- Species: H. chimaera

Binomial name
- Halegrapha chimaera Rivas Plata & Lücking (2011)
- Holotype: Mount Palali, Philippines

Species of lichen-forming fungus

Halegrapha chimaera is a species of script lichen in the family Graphidaceae. It forms a thin, whitish-grey crust on tree bark and produces black, elongated, slit-like fruiting bodies. The species is the type of its genus, Halegrapha, which was named in honour of the American lichenologist Mason Hale. It is known only from lower montane rainforest on Luzon in the Philippines.

== Taxonomy ==
Halegrapha chimaera was formally described in 2011 by Eimy Rivas Plata and Robert Lücking, at the same time that they introduced the genus Halegrapha (family Graphidaceae), with H. chimaera designated as the type species. The genus was dedicated to the American lichenologist Mason Hale, who had collected early material of the group and recognized its unusual combination of characters, but did not publish a description.

The authors regarded Halegrapha as a morphological "chimera" within the Graphidaceae: it has the black, strongly carbonized, slit-like fruiting bodies typical of Graphis, yet it matches Phaeographis and close relatives in the structure of the hymenium and in having brown, transversely septate ascospores. DNA sequence data available for H. chimaera placed the genus within the broader Phaeographis lineage, while remaining distinct from other named genera treated in that group. In their original account, the authors compared H. chimaera with Graphis anfractuosa, which can look similar externally, but differs in having the typical (hyaline) Graphis spore type rather than the brown, Phaeographis-type spores seen in Halegrapha.

== Description ==
The lichen forms a thin, continuous crust on bark, usually white to grey, with a smooth to slightly uneven surface. Individual thalli recorded in the type series were up to a few centimetres across (c. 1–5 cm). In cross-section, the thallus has a firm upper cortex and an uneven algal layer containing the green alga Trentepohlia, with abundant crystals concentrated above and within the photobiont zone (a feature emphasized for the genus as a whole). The fruiting bodies are black lirellae (elongate, slit-like apothecia) that break through the thallus surface. They are typically unbranched or only sparsely branched, with the spore-bearing disc mostly concealed by thick, black lips (labia) that soon become distinctly striate.

Microscopically, the lirellae have a laterally carbonized excipulum, and the hymenium is colourless but inspersed (filled with fine granules/oil droplets). Each ascus contains eight brown ascospores that are usually 3–5-septate and measure about 15–20 × 6–8 μm. The spores are typically ellipsoid, with the distal end often tapering slightly, and only rarely show an extra longitudinal septum. No lichen substances were detected for this species by thin-layer chromatography.

== Habitat and distribution ==
Halegrapha chimaera is a corticolous species (bark-dwelling) known only from the Philippines, where it has been collected on Mount Palali in Luzon (Nueva Vizcaya). The type material and additional collections cited in the original description were gathered at about 700 m elevation in partially disturbed lower montane rainforest. Within that habitat it was found on tree trunks in a semi-exposed situation.
