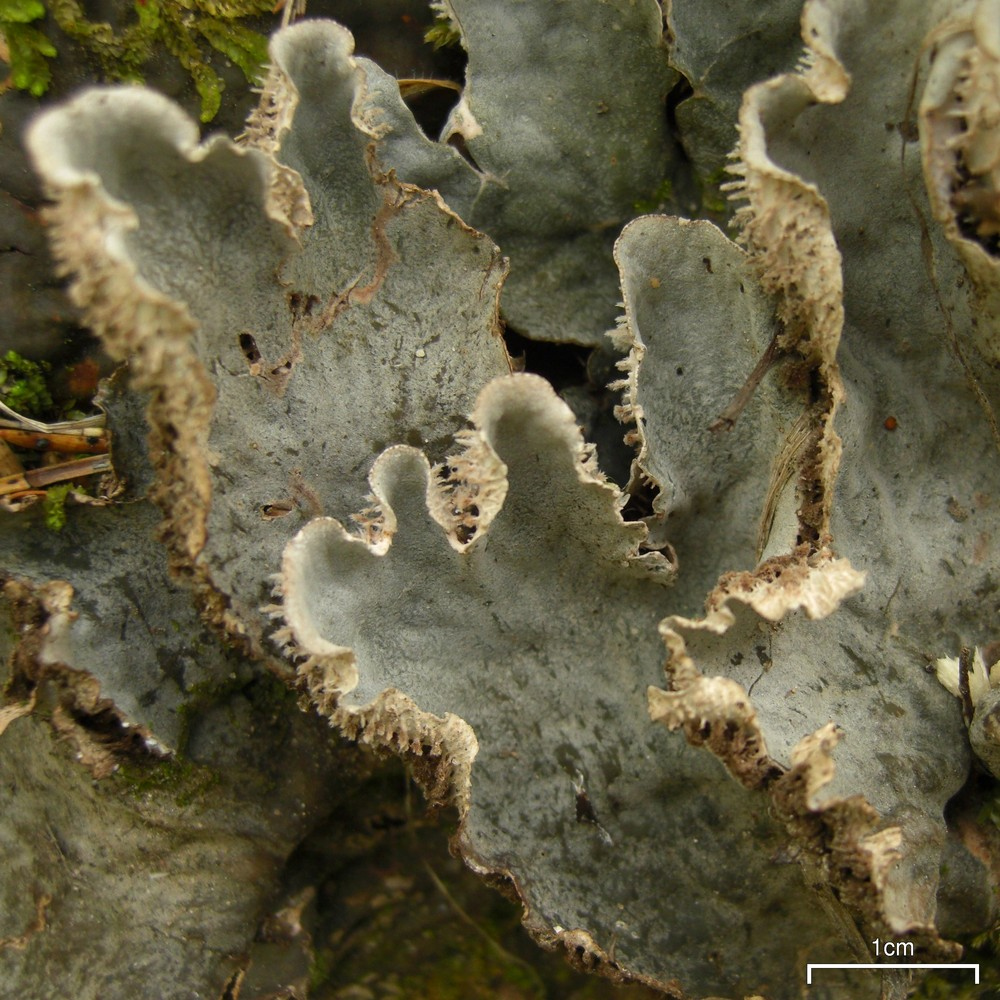

Conservation status
- Secure (NatureServe)

Scientific classification
- Kingdom: Fungi
- Division: Ascomycota
- Class: Lecanoromycetes
- Order: Peltigerales
- Family: Peltigeraceae
- Genus: Peltigera
- Species: P. canina

Binomial name
- Peltigera canina (L.) Willd. (1787)

Synonyms
- Lichen caninus L. (1753); Peltidea canina (L.) Ach. (1803); Dermatodea canina (L.) A.St.-Hil. (1805); Peltophora canina (L.) Clem. (1909)

= Peltigera canina =

Species of lichen in the family Peltigeraceae

Peltigera canina, commonly known as the dog lichen, is a widely distributed species of foliose lichen in the family Peltigeraceae. It was originally described by Carl Linnaeus in his 1753 work Species Plantarum. German botanist Carl Ludwig Willdenow transferred it to the genus Peltigera in 1787. This species is currently undergoing research as it is likely multiple species under one united name.

== Description ==
Peltigera canina has a brown to brownish-grey thallus when dry. The upper surface of the lobes, which generally measure 10–25 mm (0.4–1.0 in) across, have a fuzzy tomentum, especially near the margins. The lichen typically grows on soil, in woodlands, fields, and sandy areas The cyanobiont Nostoc associates with Peltigera canina, and resembles the species N. sphaericum and N. punctiforme.

== See also ==
- List of lichens named by Carl Linnaeus
