= Bryophilous lichen =

Moss- or liverwort-dwelling lichen

A bryophilous lichen is one that grows on a bryophyte – that is, on a moss or liverwort. Those that grow on mosses are muscicolous lichens, while those that grow on liverworts are hepaticolous lichens. Muscicolous derives from the Latin muscus meaning moss, while the suffix colous means "living or growing in or on". Lichens are slow-growing organisms, and so are far more likely to be overgrown by a bryophyte than to overgrow one. However, they are better able to compete if the bryophyte is sickly or decaying and they can be parasitic upon them. Some, rather than overgrowing the bryophyte, instead live among its branches. Bryophilous lichens are particularly common in heathland and arctic or alpine tundra. Because many are small and inconspicuous, they are easy to overlook.

== Citations ==
=== References ===
- Brodo, Irwin M.; Sharnoff, Sylvia Duran; Sharnoff, Stephen (2001). Lichens of North America. New Haven, CT: Yale University Press. ISBN 978-0-300-08249-4.
- "Definition of -colous". Merriam-Webster. 2022b.
- "Definition of musci". Merriam-Webster. 2022a.
- McCarthy, P. M. (1989). "Observations on fragmentation and loss among lichen thalli". Proceedings of the Royal Irish Academy. Section B: Biological, Geological, and Chemical Science. 89B: 25–32. JSTOR 20494485.
- Nash, Thomas H. (2008). Lichen biology (2nd ed.). Cambridge: Cambridge University Press. ISBN 978-0-511-41542-5. OCLC 252240732.
- Ohmura, Yoshihito; Mayrhoffer, Helmut (June 2016). "Protothelenella sphinctrinoides (Protothelenellaceae) new to Japan and new chemical features for several species in the genus" (PDF). Herzogia. 29 (1): 137–142.
- Smith, C. W.; Aptroot, A.; Coppins, B. J.; Fletcher, A.; Gilbert, O. L.; James, P. W.; Wolseley, P. A., eds. (2009). The Lichens of Great Britain and Ireland. London: The British Lichen Society. ISBN 978-0-9540418-8-5.
