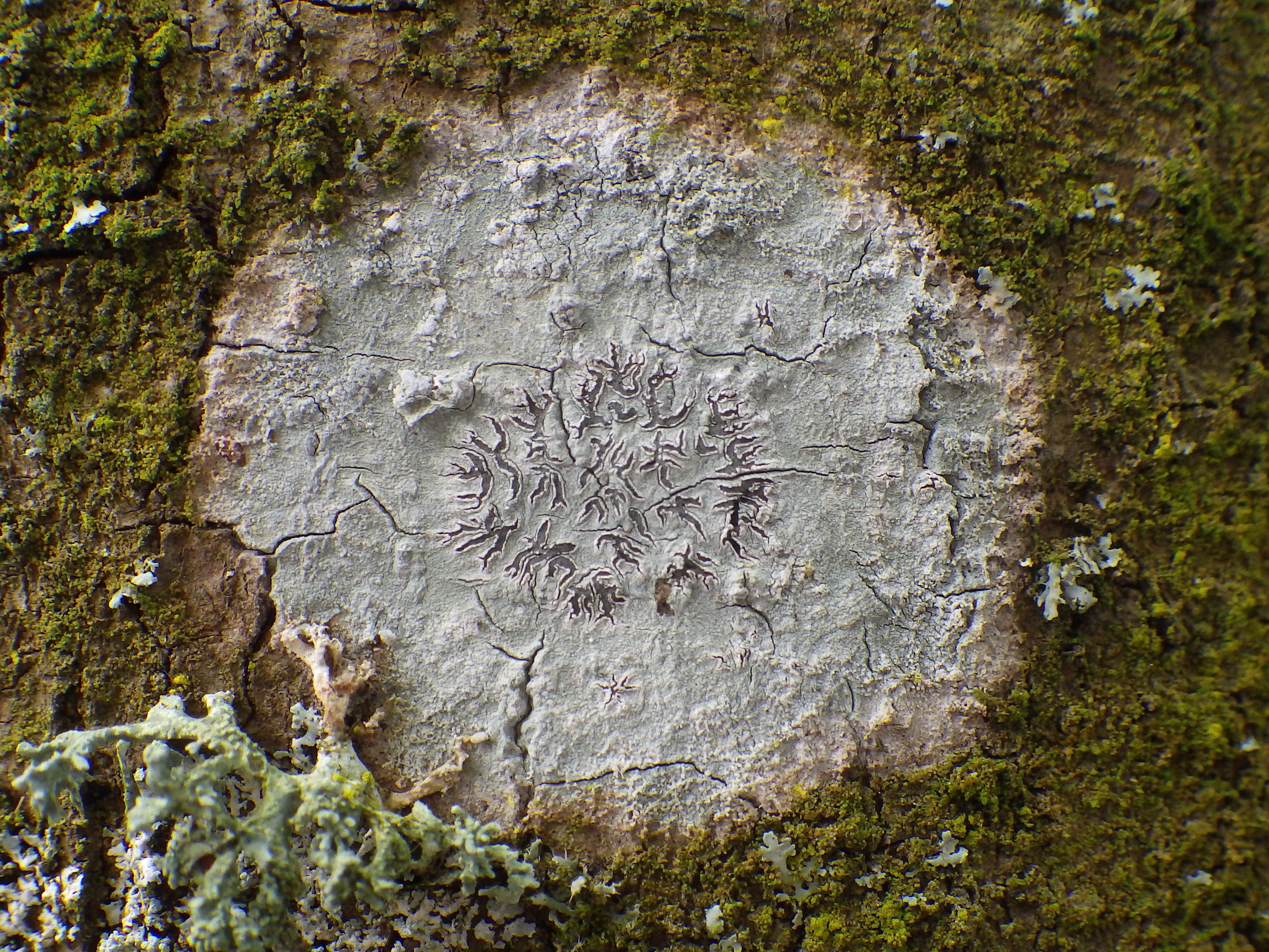
- Phaeographis dendritica in Portugal

Scientific classification
- Kingdom: Fungi
- Division: Ascomycota
- Class: Lecanoromycetes
- Order: Graphidales
- Family: Graphidaceae
- Genus: Phaeographis; Müll.Arg. (1882)

Type species
- Phaeographis dendritica (Ach.) Müll.Arg. (1882)

Synonyms
- List: Lecanactis Eschw. (1824); Pyrochroa Eschw. (1824); Platygramma G.Mey. (1825); Ustalia Fr. (1825); Leiogramma Eschw. (1833); Ectographis Trevis. (1853); Chiographa Leight. (1854); Hymenodecton Leight. (1854); Pyrographa Fée ex A.Massal. (1860); Theloschisma Trevis. (1860); Gymnographa Müll.Arg. (1887); Gymnographomyces Cif. & Tomas. (1953); Phaeographidomyces Cif. & Tomas. (1953)

= Phaeographis =

Genus of lichen-forming fungi

Phaeographis is a genus of crustose lichen-forming fungi in the family Graphidaceae. It has an estimated 180 species.

== Taxonomy ==
The genus Phaeographis was circumscribed by the Swiss lichenologist Johannes Müller Argoviensis in 1882. However, its taxonomic status was uncertain for many years due to the existence of several earlier generic names that potentially had priority.

In 2007, Robert Lücking and colleagues proposed to conserve the name Phaeographis against six earlier names: Creographa, Ectographis, Flegographa, Hymenodecton, Platygramma, and Pyrographa. They also proposed to conserve Phaeographis dendritica as the type species. This proposal was made to maintain nomenclatural stability, as Phaeographis had become a widely used name representing about 150 species.

The proposal was based on a revised generic concept of Graphidaceae presented by the German lichenologist Bettina Staiger, which for the first time provided a detailed analysis of the taxonomic relationships between genera in the family, using both morphological and molecular data.

In 2010, the Nomenclature Committee for Fungi reviewed the proposal and recommended its acceptance with a strong majority (85.7% in favour). This recommendation effectively conserved the name Phaeographis with P. dendritica as its type species, securing its taxonomic status and preventing the need to transfer numerous species to other genera. This conservation was particularly important because Phaeographis represents the second largest genus in the family Graphidaceae, containing approximately 150 species. The conservation of the name is expected to maintain stability in the taxonomy of this significant group of lichens.

== Description ==
The genus Phaeographis consists of crustose lichens, characterised by their thin, often inconspicuous thallus, which adheres closely to the substrate. In European species, the hyphae within the thallus react to iodine staining (I+) by turning blue, indicating the presence of specific starch-like compounds. The photobiont, or photosynthetic partner, is a green alga of the genus Trentepohlia, which is common in many lichens.

The reproductive structures of Phaeographis are apothecia, which are fruiting bodies that vary in form from unbranched to branched or star-like (stellate). These structures are lirellate, meaning they are elongated and slit-like in appearance. They are typically immersed within the thallus but may protrude slightly. The margin of the thallus surrounding the apothecia is generally inconspicuous, blending into the rest of the lichen surface. The true exciple, a layer of tissue surrounding the hymenium (the spore-producing region), is thin and black, and may or may not extend beneath the hymenium. The disc of the apothecia is expanded and ranges in colour from brown to black. It is often matt in texture and may be coated with a white powdery substance (pruina).

The internal structure of the apothecia includes a colourless hymenium that does not react with iodine (I–) and contains crystalline inclusions. The hamathecium, the network of sterile filaments between the spore-producing asci, is composed of unbranched paraphyses. These filaments have clavate (club-shaped) apical cells that are brownish in colour. The asci are of the Graphis-type, containing eight spores each, and do not stain with iodine (K/I–).

Ascospores are initially colourless but soon develop a pale to reddish-brown colouration within the ascus. They are I+ (purple) and are transversely divided into many segments, forming lens-shaped cells. Aphaeographis also reproduces asexually through structures called pycnidia, which produce ellipsoidal conidia. These conidia are typically straight or slightly curved.

== Species ==
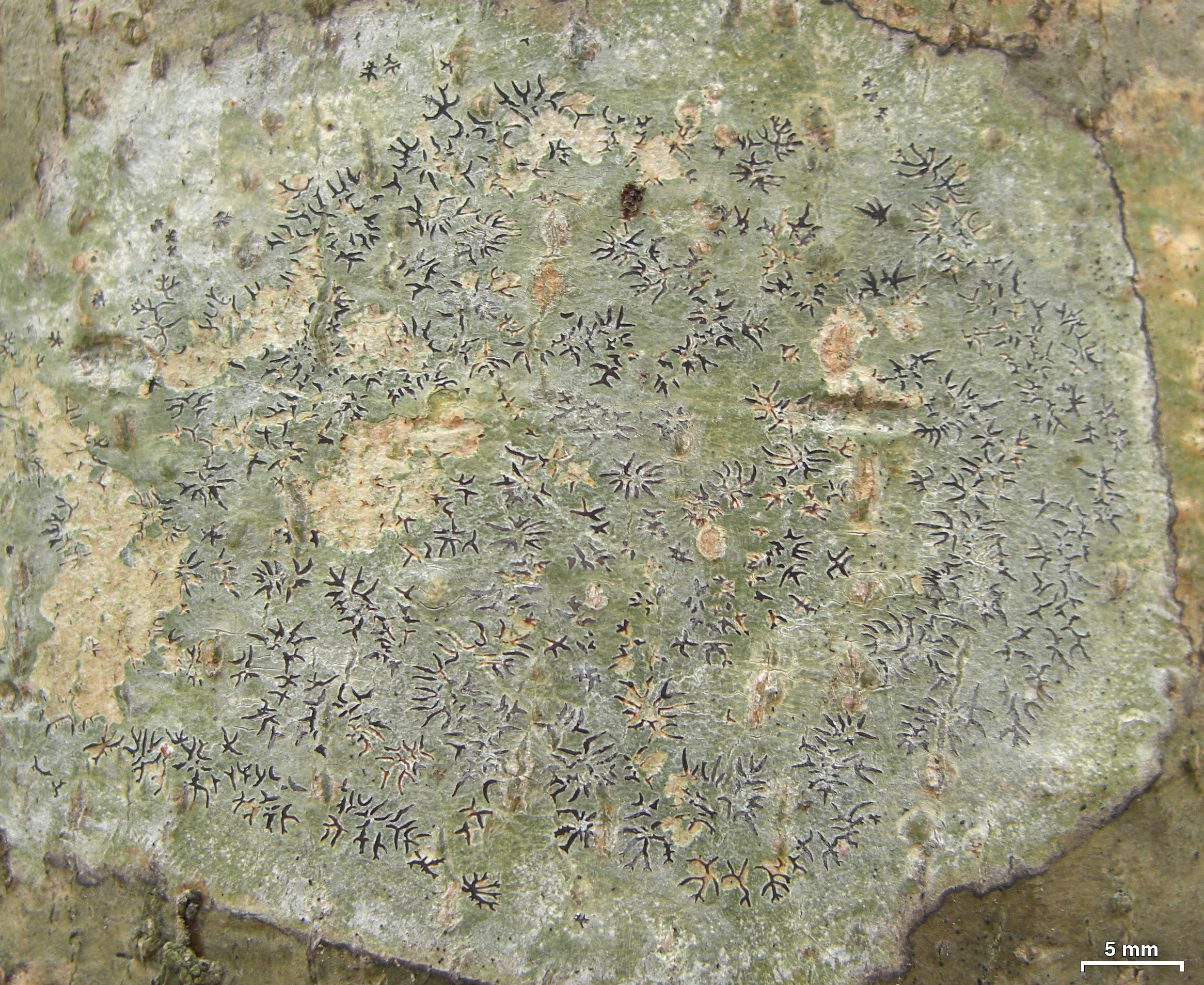
Phaeographis inusta

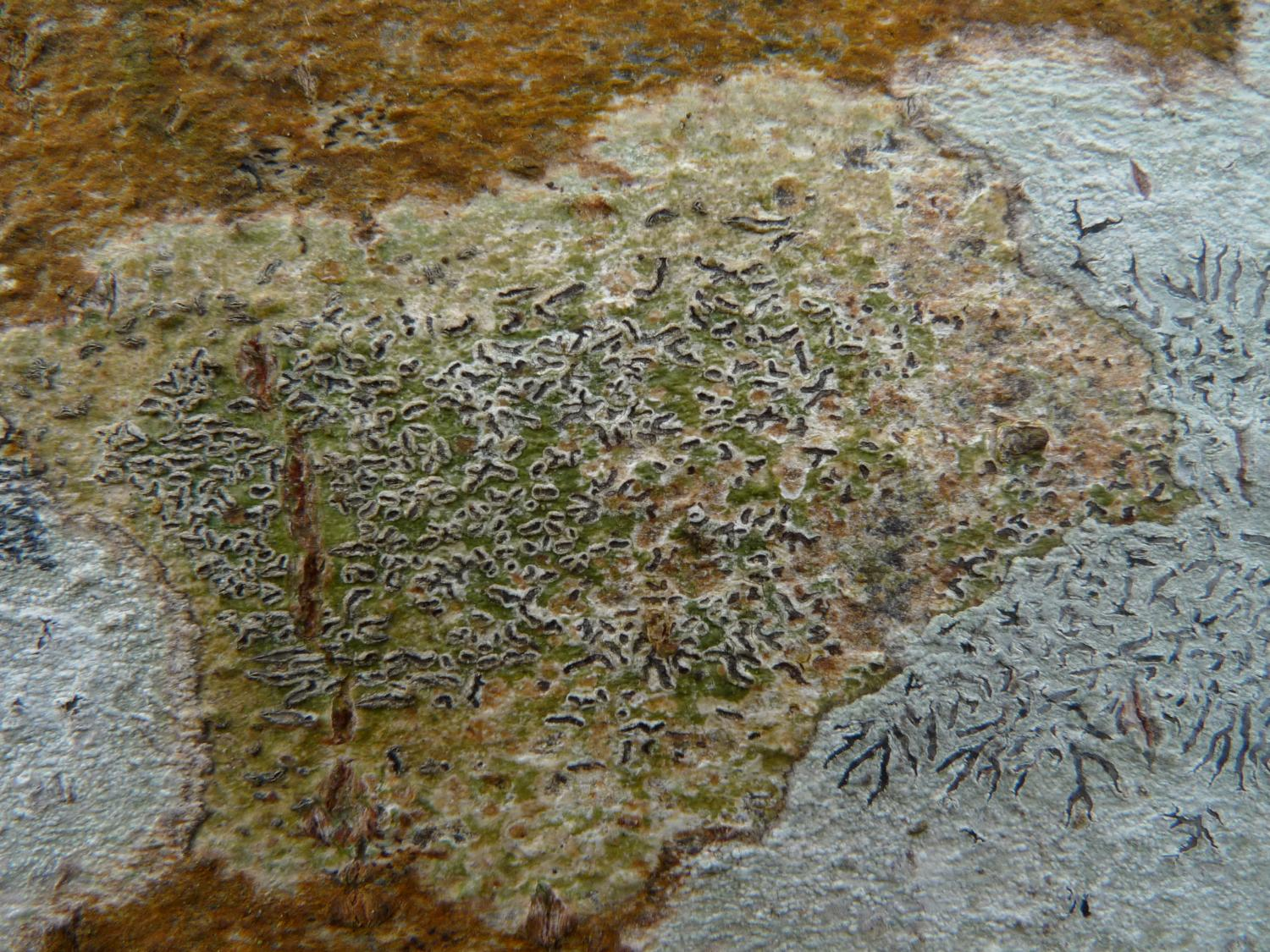
Phaeographis lyellii

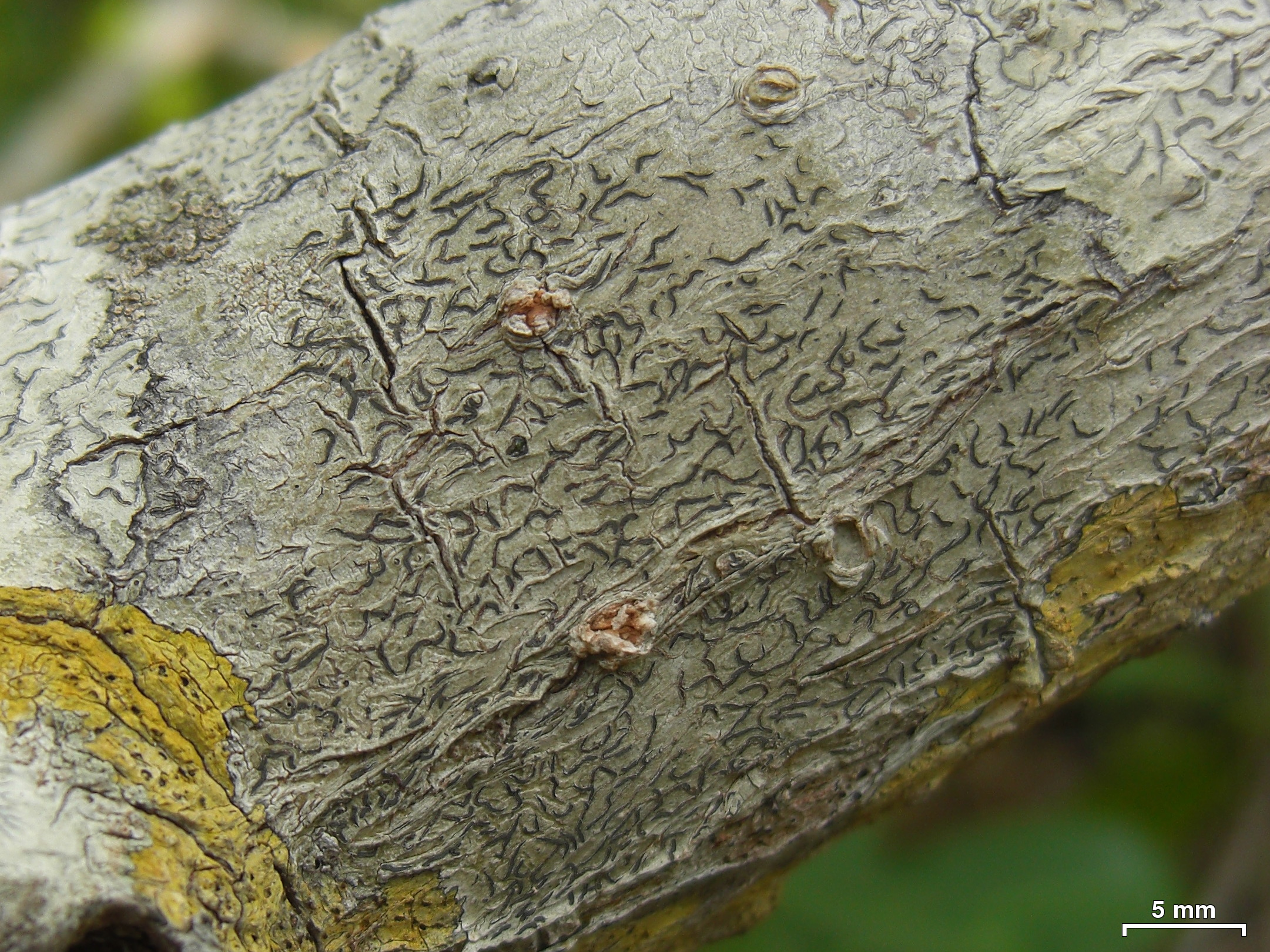
Phaeographis multicolor

- Phaeographis amazonica Staiger (2002)
- Phaeographis asteroides (Fink) Lendemer (2008)
- Phaeographis atromaculata (A.W.Archer) A.W.Archer (2005)
- Phaeographis australiensis Müll.Arg. (1882)
- Phaeographis boquetensis van den Boom (2013)
- Phaeographis caesiodisca Staiger (2002)
- Phaeographis caesiodiscoides Mongk. & Kalb (2014)
- Phaeographis caesiohians (Nyl.) Luch & Lücking (2018)
- Phaeographis caesioradians (Leight.) A.W.Archer (2005)
- Phaeographis ceratoides (Vain.) Zahlbr. (1923)
- Phaeographis ceylonensis (Kr.P. Singh & D.D.Awasthi) Kr.P.Singh & Swarnal. (2008)
- Phaeographis colligata (Stirt.) Zahlbr. (1923)
- Phaeographis decolorascens (Nyl.) Lücking (2021)
- Phaeographis delicatula Common & Lücking (2011)
- Phaeographis dendritica (Ach.) Müll.Arg. (1882)
- Phaeographis dividens (Nyl.) Kr.P.Singh & Swarnal. (2008)
- Phaeographis elaeina (C.Knight) Müll.Arg. (1895)
- Phaeographis epruinosa (Redinger) Staiger (2002)
- Phaeographis faurieana (Zahlbr.) Luch & Lücking (2018)
- Phaeographis firmula (Stirt.) Pushpi Singh & Kr.P.Singh (2017)
- Phaeographis flavescens Dal-Forno & Eliasaro (2010)
- Phaeographis fragilissima M.Nakan., Kashiw. & K.H.Moon (2015)
- Phaeographis fujianensis Xiao H.Wang, G.B.Shi & Z.F.Jia (2013)
- Phaeographis fulgurata (Fée) Luch & Lücking (2018)
- Phaeographis fumarprotocetrarica M.Nakan., Kashiw. & K.H.Moon (2008)
- Phaeographis fusca Staiger (2002)
- Phaeographis girringunensis A.W.Archer & Elix (2008)
- Phaeographis glaucoleucoides (Nyl.) Zahlbr. (1923)
- Phaeographis haloniata (Zahlbr.) Z.F.Jia & Lücking (2017)
- Phaeographis inusta (Ach.) Müll.Arg. (1882)
- Phaeographis kalbii Staiger (2002)
- Phaeographis laevigata (M.Nakan.) M.Nakan. & Kashiw. (2003)
- Phaeographis lecanographa (Nyl.) Staiger (2002)
- Phaeographis leiogrammodes (Kremp.) Müll.Arg. (1891)
- Phaeographis lindigiana Müll.Arg. (1882)
- Phaeographis litoralis (A.W.Archer) A.W.Archer (2005)
- Phaeographis lobata (Eschw.) Müll.Arg. (1882)
- Phaeographis loeiensis Boonpr., Manoch & Poengs. (2014)
- Phaeographis lyellii (Sm.) Zahlbr. (1903)
- Phaeographis major (Kremp.) Lücking (2010)
- Phaeographis multicolor R.C.Harris (1990)
- Phaeographis nardiensis A.W.Archer (2001)
- Phaeographis necopinata A.W.Archer & Elix (1999)
- Phaeographis neotriconica A.W.Archer & Elix (2009)
- Phaeographis neotricosa Redinger (1935)
- Phaeographis neotricosoides Poengs. & Kalb (2014)
- Phaeographis oricola Lendemer & R.C.Harris (2014)
- Phaeographis oscitans (Tuck.) Luch & Lücking (2018)
- Phaeographis phurueaensis Poengs. & Kalb (2014)
- Phaeographis platycarpa Müll.Arg. (1894)
- Phaeographis pleiospora (Zahlbr.) Z.F.Jia & Lücking (2017)
- Phaeographis pseudomelana Müll.Arg. (1895)
- Phaeographis pseudostromatica Seavey & J.Seavey (2017)
- Phaeographis quadrifera (Nyl.) Staiger (2002)
- Phaeographis radiata Seavey & J.Seavey (2017)
- Phaeographis rhodoplaca (Müll.Arg.) Luch & Lücking (2018)
- Phaeographis rubrostroma M.Cáceres & Lücking (2007)
- Phaeographis salazinica (A.W.Archer) A.W.Archer (2007)
- Phaeographis sarcographoides Herrera-Camp., N.Sánchez & Lücking (2019)
- Phaeographis scalpturata (Ach.) Staiger (2002)
- Phaeographis schizolomoides Poengs. & Kalb (2014)
- Phaeographis siamensis Poengs. & Kalb (2014)
- Phaeographis smithii (Leight.) B.de Lesd. (1910)
- Phaeographis spondaica (Nyl.) Lücking (2015)
- Phaeographis striata Bungartz (2010)
- Phaeographis subdividens (Leight.) Müll.Arg. (1882)
- Phaeographis subintricata Müll. Arg. (1895)
- Phaeographis subinusta (Leight.) Müll.Arg. (1882)
- Phaeographis subtigrina (Vain.) Zahlbr. (1923)
- Phaeographis tuberculifera A.W.Archer (2001)
- Phaeographis xantholirellinata Aptroot (2023) – Brazil
- Phaeographis xanthonica Kalb & Matthes-Leicht (2009)
