= Sticta atroandensis =

Scientific classification
- Domain: Eukaryota
- Kingdom: Fungi
- Division: Ascomycota
- Class: Lecanoromycetes
- Order: Peltigerales
- Family: Peltigeraceae
- Genus: Sticta
- Species: S. atroandensis

Binomial name
- Sticta atroandensis B.Moncada & Lücking (2013)

Species of lichen

Sticta atroandensis is a species of foliose lichen in the family Peltigeraceae. It is found in the Colombian Andes.

== Taxonomy ==
The lichen was formally described as a new species in by lichenologists Bibiana Moncada and Robert Lücking. The type specimen was collected from Valle de las Lagunillas in the Parque Nacional Natural El Cocuy (Boyacá) at an altitude of 3,800 m (12,500 ft). The species epithet refers to its similarity to Sticta andensis, but with some notable differences. Specifically, S. atroandensis is distinguished from Sticta andensis by its dark lower tomentum and smooth apothecial margins.

In a time-calibrated chronogram of the phylogeny of the genus Sticta, Sticta atroandensis was most closely related to S. ambavillaria and a clade containing S. atlantica, S. arachnofuliginosa, and S. pseudohumboldtii.

== Description ==
The thallus of Sticta atroandensis is orbicular in shape and can grow up to 10 cm (3.9 in) in diameter. It has sparse branching patterns and lobes that are suborbicular and imbricate, with rounded tips and entire margins. The upper surface of the lichen is scrobiculate, olive-green when fresh, and brown-grey to dark brown in the herbarium. The true marginal cilia are absent, but projections of the lower tomentum resembling cilia are usually present. Cyphellae are abundant, rounded, urceolate, and brown-black. The apothecia are abundant, laminal, sub-pedicellate, and biatorine, with indistinct stipes. The disc is orange-red to red-brown and the margin is cream-colored to beige. The hymenium is up to 105 μm high and the ascospores are hyaline, fusiform, and have 1–3 septa.

The lower surface of the lichen is undulate, with the primary lower tomentum dense and thick, while the secondary lower tomentum is pubescent to arachnoid and pale. Rhizines are absent, and vegetative propagules are absent as well. The medulla is compact and white. The upper cortex is paraplectenchymatous, while the photobiont layer is 45–75 μm thick. The medulla is 40–150 μm thick and lacks crystals. The lower cortex is paraplectenchymatous and is 20–35 μm thick. The lower primary tomentum is composed of fascicles (bundles) formed of 12–20 hyphae, while the lower secondary tomentum is composed of simple, septate hyphae with their tips free. The cavity of the cyphellae is 40–220 μm high, and the cells of the basal membrane lack papillae.

== Habitat and distribution ==
Sticta atroandensis seems to have a limited distribution in the Colombian Andes, specifically in the páramo and superparamo life zones. This species has been observed on the western slopes of the Cordillera Central and in the Cordillera Oriental, at elevations ranging from 3,600 to 4,800 m (11,800 to 15,700 ft). Sticta atroandensis typically grows epiphytically in semi-exposed to exposed microhabitats and is frequently found in association with liverworts from the genus Metzgeria and the family Lejeuneaceae.
