= Sticta lumbschiana =

Scientific classification
- Domain: Eukaryota
- Kingdom: Fungi
- Division: Ascomycota
- Class: Lecanoromycetes
- Order: Peltigerales
- Family: Peltigeraceae
- Genus: Sticta
- Species: S. lumbschiana

Binomial name
- Sticta lumbschiana B.Moncada & Lücking (2013)

Species of lichen

Sticta lumbschiana is a species of foliose lichen in the family Peltigeraceae. It is found in the Colombian Andes.

== Taxonomy ==
The lichen was formally described as a new species in by lichenologists Bibiana Moncada and Robert Lücking. The type specimen was collected from the Páramo de Guasca, Guasca, Cundinamarca) at an altitude of 3,200 m (10,500 ft). The species epithet honours lichenologist colleague Thorsten Lumbsch, "for his invaluable contributions to lichenology and his support of this project on the genus Sticta".

In a time-calibrated chronogram of the phylogeny of the genus Sticta, Sticta lumbschiana was most closely related to S. pseudodilatata and a clade containing S. papillata, S. dilata, and S. macrocyphyllata.

== Habitat and distribution ==
Sticta lumbschiana has been recorded in (semi-)exposed microsites within (sub-)andine forests and páramo vegetation at altitudes ranging from 2,100 to 3,750 m (6,890 to 12,300 ft). Its distribution is limited to the Cordillera Central and eastern slopes of the Cordillera Oriental regions. The species can be found growing on bark, fallen trunks, and sometimes even on soil. It is commonly associated with liverworts of the genera Metzgeria, Bazzania, Plagiochila, and Radula.
