= Sticta rhizinata =

Conservation status
- Least Concern (IUCN 3.1)

Scientific classification
- Kingdom: Fungi
- Division: Ascomycota
- Class: Lecanoromycetes
- Order: Peltigerales
- Family: Peltigeraceae
- Genus: Sticta
- Species: S. rhizinata

Binomial name
- Sticta rhizinata B.Moncada & Lücking (2012)

Species of lichen

Sticta rhizinata is a species of foliose lichen in the family Peltigeraceae. Found in Colombia, it was formally described by Bibiana Moncada and Robert Lücking in 2012. It is a member of the Sticta weigelii species complex. The type specimen was collected in Chingaza National Natural Park (Cundinamarca) at an altitude of 3,430 m (11,250 ft). The lichen is only known to occur in the Andes of Colombia at altitudes between 2,300 and 3,720 m (7,550 and 12,200 ft). Here it grows on the ground, often associated with bryophytes of the genera Plagiochila, Frullania, Metzgeria, Campylopus, and Dicranum. Frequent lichen associates include Everniastrum, Hypotrachyna, and Peltigera. The specific epithet rhizinata refers to its conspicuous rhizines.
