= Sticta pseudohumboldtii =

Scientific classification
- Domain: Eukaryota
- Kingdom: Fungi
- Division: Ascomycota
- Class: Lecanoromycetes
- Order: Peltigerales
- Family: Peltigeraceae
- Genus: Sticta
- Species: S. pseudohumboldtii

Binomial name
- Sticta pseudohumboldtii B.Moncada & Lücking (2013)

Species of lichen

Sticta pseudohumboldtii is a species of foliose lichen in the family Peltigeraceae. It is found in the Colombian Andes.

== Taxonomy ==
The lichen was formally described as a new species in by lichenologists Bibiana Moncada and Robert Lücking.The type specimen was collected in the Parque Ecológico Matarredonda (El Verjón, Cundinamarca) at an altitude of 3,220 m (10,560 ft). The species epithet refers to its resemblance to Sticta humboldtii, but with the added Greek prefix "pseudo," meaning "false." This is because, unlike the similarly named S. parahumboldtii, S. pseudohumboldtii is not the closest relative to S. humboldtii. Rather, it is a sister species to the morphologically distinct S. arachnofuliginosa.

In a time-calibrated chronogram of the phylogeny of the genus Sticta, Sticta pseudohumboldtii was most closely related to S. arachnofuliginosa; these two species comprise a clade with a sister relationship to S. atlantica.

== Habitat and distribution ==
Sticta pseudohumboldtii is found in the Colombian Andes. It has been recorded in subandine forests and páramo vegetation at elevations ranging from 1,900 to 3,975 m (6,234 to 13,041 ft). This species is known to grow epiphytically and has been found in all three major Cordilleras. Sticta pseudohumboldtii is commonly associated with Metzgeria spp., Heterodermia circinalis, Leptogium spp., and Oropogon bicolor.
