= Sticta isidiokunthii =

Conservation status
- Least Concern (IUCN 3.1)

Scientific classification
- Kingdom: Fungi
- Division: Ascomycota
- Class: Lecanoromycetes
- Order: Peltigerales
- Family: Peltigeraceae
- Genus: Sticta
- Species: S. isidiokunthii

Binomial name
- Sticta isidiokunthii B.Moncada & Lücking (2012)

Species of lichen

Sticta isidiokunthii is a species of foliose lichen in the family Peltigeraceae. Found in the South American Andes, it was formally described by Bibiana Moncada and Robert Lücking in 2012. The type specimen was collected by the first author in the Chingaza National Natural Park (Cundinamarca) at an altitude of 3,430 m (11,250 ft). The lichen occurs in the Andes of Bolivia and Colombia at elevations between 2,290 and 3,600 m (7,510 and 11,810 ft). It grows on the bark of shrubs and small trees, often associated with liverworts in the genera Metzgeria and Microlejeunea, as well as lichens from the genera Erioderma, Leptogium, and Sticta. The specific epithet refers to its resemblance to Sticta kunthii and the fact that it makes isidia.
