= Sticta papillata =

Scientific classification
- Domain: Eukaryota
- Kingdom: Fungi
- Division: Ascomycota
- Class: Lecanoromycetes
- Order: Peltigerales
- Family: Peltigeraceae
- Genus: Sticta
- Species: S. papillata

Binomial name
- Sticta papillata B.Moncada & Lücking (2012)

Species of lichen

Sticta papillata is a species of foliose lichen in the family Peltigeraceae. Found in Colombia, it was formally described by Bibiana Moncada and Robert Lücking in 2012. The type specimen was collected in the páramo of Villapinzón (Cundinamarca) at an altitude of 3,200 m (10,500 ft). It is only known to occur in the Colombian Andes, in the Cordillera Occidental and the Cordillera Oriental, at elevations between 2,720–3,200 m (8,920–10,500 ft). The lichen grows on the bark of shrubs and trees, often in association with liverworts of the genera Radula and Metzgeria, as well as Leptogium lichens. The specific epithet refers to the characteristic papillae (small protrusions) that occur on the cells of the basal membrane of the cyphellae.
