= Sticta viviana =

Scientific classification
- Domain: Eukaryota
- Kingdom: Fungi
- Division: Ascomycota
- Class: Lecanoromycetes
- Order: Peltigerales
- Family: Peltigeraceae
- Genus: Sticta
- Species: S. viviana

Binomial name
- Sticta viviana Alej.Suárez & Lücking (2013)

Species of lichen

Sticta viviana is a species of corticolous (bark-dwelling), foliose lichen in the family Peltigeraceae. It is found in Colombia, where it grows on the branches and twigs of shrubs and treelets in high-elevation páramo habitat.

== Taxonomy ==
The lichen was formally described as a new species in 2013 by Alejandra Suárez and Robert Lücking. The type specimen was collected from the Páramo de Guasca near Bogotá (Cundinamarca) at an altitude of 3,350 m (10,990 ft), where it was found growing on the branches of páramo shrubs. The species epithet honours Colombian lichenologist Bibiana Moncada ("viviana" is the original form of Bibiana), who collected the type during her studies on the systematics and phylogeny of Sticta in Colombia.

A similar species, Sticta fuliginosa, can be distinguished from Sticta viviana by several characteristics. S. viviana has smaller thallus lobes with a shiny, pitted surface, and has clustered, knob-like projections called corymbose isidia. It also has a dark lower layer of fine hairs called tomentum, and its small, usually stemless, vase-shaped pores called cyphellae have one small protrusion per cell at the bottom. Finally, its medulla does not change colour when treated with potassium hydroxide (K−). Sticta viviana is a species that has a similar appearance to S. fuliginosa, with broad, rounded lobes and laminal isidia. In traditional identification methods, it would have been classified as part of the S. fuliginosa group, as there are over 15 species that share this general morphology. Modern molecular phylogenetic methods have shown that several distinct species share the name associated by this gross morphology.

== Description ==
This lichen is flat, circular or irregular, and can be up to 5 cm (2 in) in diameter. It comprises lobes that are about 5–10 in (130–250 mm) long and 7–15 mm (0.3–0.6 in) wide. The upper surface of the lobes is dark brown and shiny, with a bumpy texture towards the tips. There are small, stick-like growths called isidia on the surface. The lower surface of this lichen is cream-colored and has a rugose to undulate texture. It is covered by a primary tomentum, which is dense and thick except towards the margin. The primary tomentum comprises soft, brown hairs 340–430 μm long and clustered in bundles of 12–20 branched hyphae. These hyphae have free, moniliform apices. There is also a secondary tomentum, thinly arachnoid and cream-colored to beige. It is formed by solitary hyphae 7–23 μm long and has free, septate apices.

This lichen does not have rhizines. Instead, it has sparse cyphellae on the center and margins of the thallus. The cyphellae are irregular to angular in outline and are cupuliform to urceolate with wide pores (0.3–0.7 mm diameter). They are sessile to suprasessile, which means that the basal membrane is at or above the level of the lower cortex, and the cyphellae margin is basally constricted. The margins of the cyphellae are erect to slightly involute and are cream-colored to golden brown. The basal membrane of the cyphellae, which covers the medulla, is white.

Sticta aymara has some similarities to S. viviana: characteristics such as small thalli size, the presence of isidia, and the absence of apothecia unite these two species. However, S. aymara has a dark brown, scrobiculate (covered with small, shallow pits) to faveolate (with small, depressed, and pit-like structures) upper surface with cream-coloured maculae (small, flat patches or spots on the surface).

== Habitat and distribution ==
Sticta viviana is an epiphytic lichen species that grows on the branches and twigs of shrubs and treelets in the páramo habitat. It is usually found in areas that are somewhat exposed to light. The paramo is a high-altitude ecosystem found in the northern Andes, which includes the mountainous regions of Venezuela, Colombia, Ecuador, Peru, and Bolivia. The habitat preference of Sticta viviana is likely influenced by the unique environmental conditions in the páramo.
