= Sticta parahumboldtii =

Scientific classification
- Kingdom: Fungi
- Division: Ascomycota
- Class: Lecanoromycetes
- Order: Peltigerales
- Family: Peltigeraceae
- Genus: Sticta
- Species: S. parahumboldtii

Binomial name
- Sticta parahumboldtii B.Moncada & Lücking (2013)

Species of lichen

Sticta parahumboldtii is a species of foliose lichen in the family Peltigeraceae. It is found in the Colombian Andes.

== Taxonomy ==
The lichen was formally described as a new species by lichenologists Bibiana Moncada and Robert Lücking. The type specimen was collected near the La Laguna de Chisacá (Cundinamarca) at an altitude of 3,724 m (12,218 ft). The species epithet refers to its resemblance to and close association with Sticta humboldtii. The name "parahumboldtii" is derived from the Greek prefix "para," meaning "next to" or "near."

In a time-calibrated chronogram of the phylogeny of the genus Sticta, Sticta parahumboldtii was most closely related to S. hirsutofuliginosa and a clade containing S. atlantica, S. humboldtii, and S. arachnosylvatica.

== Habitat and distribution ==
Sticta parahumboldtii inhabits the Colombian Andes, growing in high-andine forests and páramo vegetation, at elevations ranging from 3,000 to 4,000 m (9,800 to 13,100 ft), in shaded to semi-exposed microsites. This species has been found in the Cordillera Central, Cordillera Occidental, and the western slopes of the Cordillera Oriental. Sticta parahumboldtii typically grows on mossy soil and epiphytically, frequently found in association with species of Metzgeria, Frullania, and Leptogium.

Sticta parahumboldtii is one of only a few species in the genus Sticta that possess an upper tomentum, a cyanobacterial photobiont, and lack vegetative propagules. There are two other species in Colombia that share a very similar morphology: S. humboldtii and S. pseudohumboldtii.
