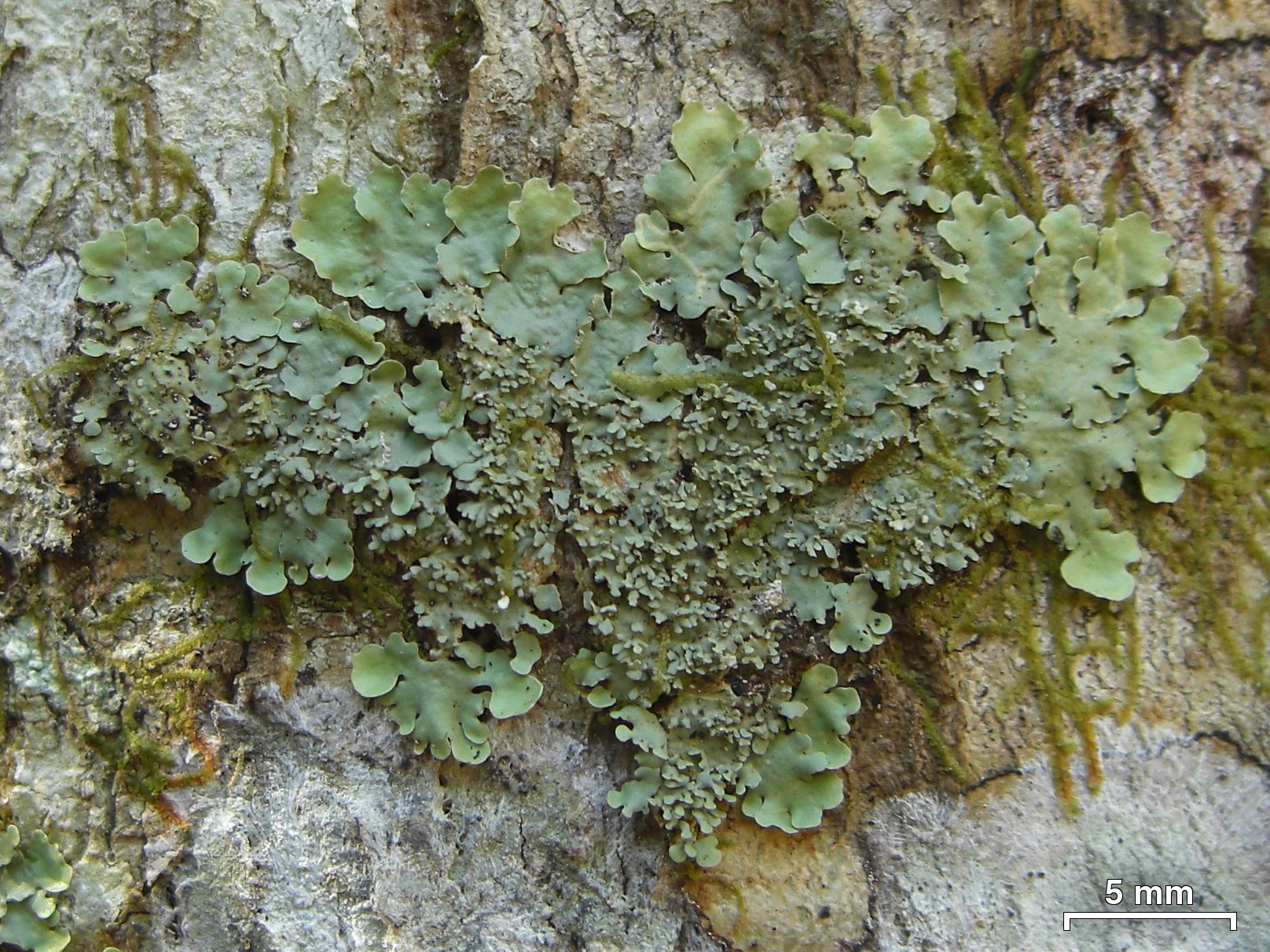
- Emmanuelia tenuis in Fakahatchee Strand, Florida, USA

Scientific classification
- Domain: Eukaryota
- Kingdom: Fungi
- Division: Ascomycota
- Class: Lecanoromycetes
- Order: Peltigerales
- Family: Peltigeraceae
- Genus: Emmanuelia; Ant.Simon, Lücking & Goffinet (2020)

Type species
- Emmanuelia ravenelii (Tuck.) Ant.Simon & Goffinet (2020)

= Emmanuelia =

Genus of fungi

Emmanuelia is a genus of lichen-forming fungi in the subfamily Lobarioideae of the family Peltigeraceae. It has 12 species. It was circumscribed in 2020 by Antoine Simon, Robert Lücking, and Bernard Goffinet. They assigned Emmanuelia ravenelii as the type species, reasoning "this is probably the best-documented species of the lineage and its identification is straightforward". The genus name honours Belgian lichenologist Emmanuël Sérusiaux, "for his extensive contributions to advancing our understanding of the diversification of the Peltigerales".

Molecular phylogenetic analyses show that the genus forms a monophyletic group that has a sister taxon relationship with the lineage containing the genera Dendriscosticta, Lobariella, and Yoshimuriella. Using time-calibrated phylogeny, Emmanuelia is estimated to have emerged about 10 million years ago in the late Miocene, and as such, is one of the younger genera in the Lobarioideae.

== Species ==
As of July 2024, Species Fungorum (in the Catalogue of Life) accept 12 species of Emmanuelia. The following list gives the species of Emmanuelia followed by their author citation (the original describer of the species is in parentheses), year transferred into Emmanuelia, and country where the type was collected.

- Emmanuelia americana (Vain.) Lücking, B.Moncada & Gumboski (2020) – Brazil
- Emmanuelia conformis (Vain.) Lücking, B.Moncada & Ant.Simon (2020) – Mexico
- Emmanuelia cuprea (Müll.Arg.) Lücking, B. Moncada & Ant.Simon (2020) – Paraguay
- Emmanuelia elaeodes (Malme) Lücking, Spielmann & S.M.Martins (2020) – Brazil
- Emmanuelia erosa (Eschw.) Lücking, M.Cáceres & Ant.Simon (2020) – Brazil
- Emmanuelia excisa (Müll.Arg.) Lücking, B.Moncada & Ant.Simon (2020) – Colombia
- Emmanuelia lobulifera (B.J.Moore) Ant.Simon & Goffinet (2020) – Florida, USA
- Emmanuelia ornata (Malme) Lücking, B.Moncada & Bungartz (2020) – Brazil
- Emmanuelia patinifera (Taylor) Lücking, M.Cáceres & Ant.Simon (2020) – Brazil
- Emmanuelia pseudolivacea (Zahlbr.) Lücking, B.Moncada & Ant.Simon (2020) – Brazil
- Emmanuelia ravenelii (Tuck.) Ant.Simon & Goffinet (2020) – South Carolina, USA
- Emmanuelia tenuis (Vain.) Lücking, B.Moncada & Gumboski (2020) – Brazil
