= Sticta arbuscula =

Scientific classification
- Domain: Eukaryota
- Kingdom: Fungi
- Division: Ascomycota
- Class: Lecanoromycetes
- Order: Peltigerales
- Family: Peltigeraceae
- Genus: Sticta
- Species: S. arbuscula

Binomial name
- Sticta arbuscula B.Moncada & Lücking (2012)

Species of lichen

Sticta arbuscula is a species of foliose lichen in the family Peltigeraceae. Found in the South American Andes, it was formally described by Bibiana Moncada and Robert Lücking in 2012. The type specimen was collected in Chingaza National Natural Park (Cundinamarca, Colombia) at an altitude of 3,430 m (11,250 ft). The lichen is found in the Andes of Colombia and Ecuador, at elevations between 3,000 and 3,700 m (9,800 and 12,100 ft), where it grows on bark of twigs and stems. It typically associates with bryophytes from the family Lejeuneaceae and the genera Plagiochila, Metzgeria, Jubula, and Omphalanthus. The specific epithet arbuscula refers to the characteristic arbuscular isidia–branched with a stalk at the base.
