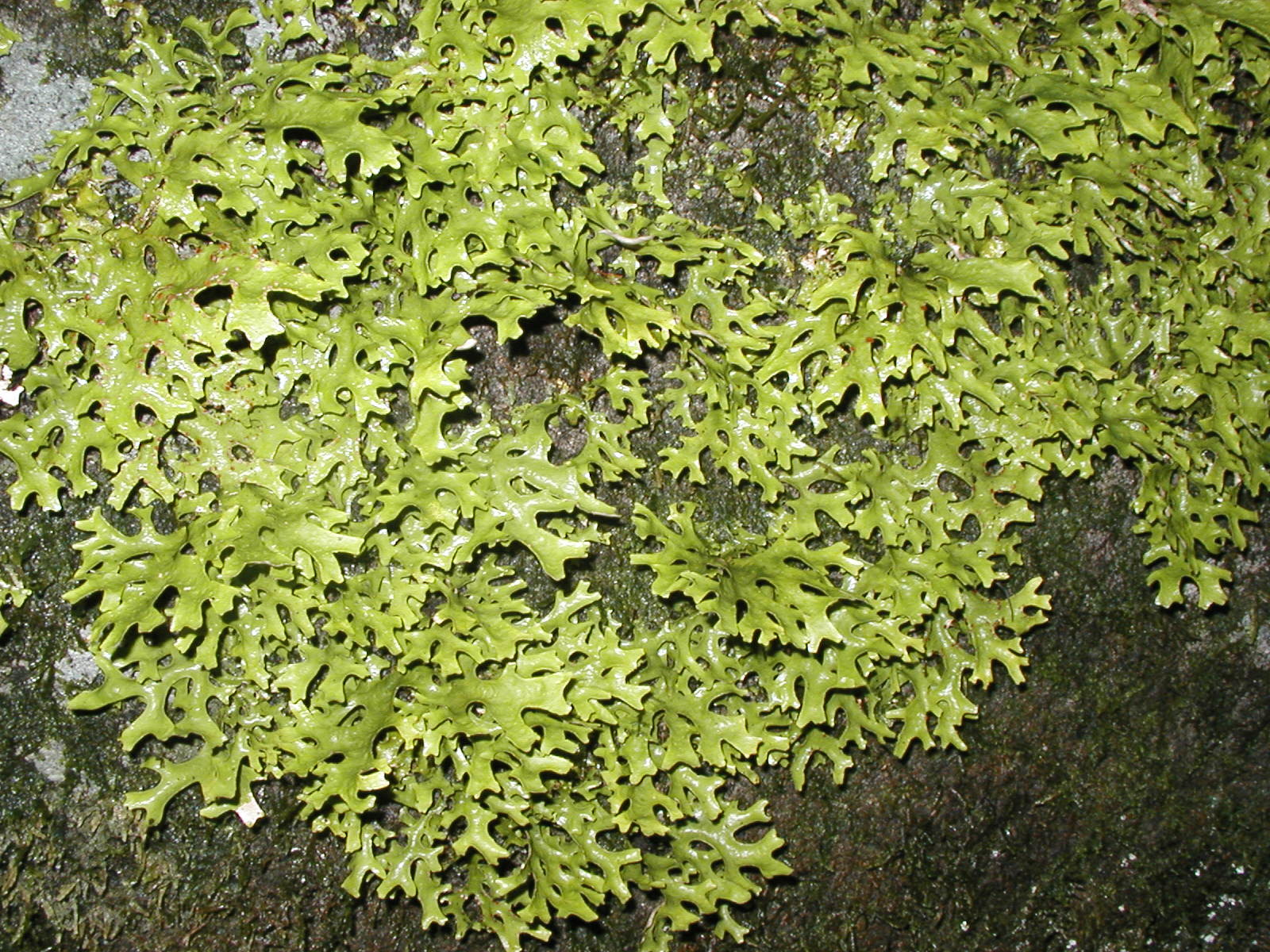
- Chloromorph (green algal form) form

Scientific classification
- Domain: Eukaryota
- Kingdom: Fungi
- Division: Ascomycota
- Class: Lecanoromycetes
- Order: Peltigerales
- Family: Peltigeraceae
- Genus: Sticta
- Species: S. canariensis

Binomial name
- Sticta canariensis (Bory) Bory ex Delise (1822)

Synonyms
- List: Pulmonaria canariensis Bory (1809); Sticta damicornis var. canariensis (Bory) Flörke (1809); Sticta damicornis f. canariensis (Bory) Ach. (1814); Lobaria damicornis var. canariensis (Bory) Kunze (1898); Lichen spongiosus With. (1776); Sticta dufourii Delise (1822); Sticta filicina var. dufourii (Delise) Mont. (1852); Sticta sylvatica var. dufourii (Delise) Nyl. (1858); Stictina sylvatica subsp. dufourii (Delise) Nyl. (1860); Stictina dufourii (Delise) Nyl. (1860); Stictina sylvatica var. dufourii (Delise) Nyl. (1865); Cladonia glauca f. dufourii (Delise) Vain. (1887); Cyanisticta dufourii (Delise) Gyeln. (1931); Sticta fimbriata Taylor (1847)

= Sticta canariensis =

Species of lichen

Sticta canariensis is a species of cyanolichen in the family Peltigeraceae. It is known for its ability to form photosymbiodemes – distinct morphological forms resulting from symbioses with either green algae or cyanobacteria. The species exhibits two main forms: a bright green chloromorph with dichotomously branched lobes and brown fruiting bodies, and a dark blue-grey cyanomorph with phyllidia and white mottling. It has a disjunct distribution across Atlantic Europe and Macaronesia, where it primarily grows as an epiphyte in laurisilva forests but can also be found on soil and rocks near water sources. While historically confused with similar species worldwide, molecular studies have shown that true S. canariensis is restricted to western Europe and Macaronesia. The species is considered rare throughout its range, with the chloromorph form being particularly uncommon.

== Taxonomy ==
It was described as a new species in 1809 by Jean-Baptiste Bory de Saint-Vincent, who classified it in the genus Pulmonaria. Dominique François Delise validly transferred the taxon to the genus Sticta in 1822, giving it the binomial by which it is known today. In his description, Delise distinguished S. canariensis from the similar species S. damicornis by its wider, divergent fronds that spread in a fan-like pattern rather than growing in bundled groups. He noted its characteristic colour changes – displaying a vibrant green when humid, similar to the European S. pulmonacea (now Lobaria pulmonaria), and shifting to yellow-bronze when dry. He described its distinctive features including deeply lacinated fronds with broad horn-like ends, smooth urn-shaped cyphellae with inflexed rims, and scattered red apothecia (fruiting bodies). The type locality was recorded as the Laguna forest on Tenerife, where Delise noted it growing abundantly on laurel trees.

Historically, green apotheciate species of Sticta have presented significant taxonomic challenges. Specimens worldwide were commonly identified as either S. canariensis or more frequently as S. damicornis. This led to the establishment of numerous infraspecific taxa within a broadly defined S. damicornis, with some authors even treating S. canariensis as a form or variety of that species. However, molecular studies have revealed that S. canariensis (in the strict sense) is restricted to western Europe and Macaronesia, and specimens identified as this species from other regions, particularly the Neotropics, actually represent different species.

== Description ==
Sticta canariensis is distinctive for its ability to form photosymbiodemes – different morphological forms resulting from symbioses with two different types of photosynthetic partners: unicellular green algae (Symbiochloris sp. 3 from the order Trebouxiales) and cyanobacteria (Nostoc). These partnerships result in two dramatically different morphological forms of the lichen.

The chloromorph (green algal form) produces bright green thalli measuring 5–15 cm in diameter. Its lobes are elongated and dichotomously branched, each 5–15 mm wide. The lobes exhibit a characteristic subdichotomous branching pattern with truncate tips and relatively short segments between branches, with new branches typically forming at angles of 60-90 degrees. This form regularly produces reproductive structures (apothecia), which are brown in colour and measure 1–2 mm across. These apothecia can develop both on the surface (laminally) and along the edges (marginally) of the thallus. The underside of the thallus is a light to medium ochraceous-brown colour, featuring small pore-like structures (cyphellae) that blend in with the surrounding surface.

The cyanomorph (cyanobacterial form) appears dark blue-grey, often featuring white mottled patterns. Its thalli can reach up to 10 cm in diameter and frequently form extensive colonies. The lobes, measuring 1–2 cm across, overlap each other and have irregularly incised margins featuring small outgrowths called phyllidia. These phyllidia are flattened, ascending structures measuring 0.5–0.8 mm, which branch dichotomously multiple times. They initially form dense clusters along the thallus margins but can also develop on the thallus surface in older specimens.

The species can also form composite thalli, where both forms occur together. In these cases, small bright green chloromorph leaflets emerge from the darker cyanomorph thalli.

== Habitat and distribution ==
Sticta canariensis has a disjunct distribution across temperate and subtropical regions, occurring in Atlantic Europe and Macaronesia. In Atlantic Europe, it is found in south-western England, Wales, and along the south-western coast of Norway. In Macaronesia, it occurs across the archipelagos of the Azores, Madeira, and the Canary Islands.

The species is strongly associated with laurisilva forests in its Macaronesian range. These ancient forest ecosystems are considered highly vulnerable to global climate change. The species shows habitat flexibility in terms of substrate preference. While it primarily grows as an epiphyte on deciduous trees including Laurus, Fraxinus and Quercus species, it can also be found growing directly on soil and rocks, particularly on cliff faces and boulders. These terrestrial and saxicolous populations are typically found in close proximity to water sources and within cool, shaded forest environments.

Genetic studies have revealed distinct population structures between the northern (England and Norway) and southern (Macaronesian) parts of its range, suggesting limited gene flow between these distant populations. Among the Macaronesian populations, those in Madeira show particularly high genetic diversity.

The species is considered rare throughout its entire range, with the chlorobiont form (containing green algae) being particularly uncommon compared to the cyanobiont form (containing cyanobacteria).
