= Sticta arachnofuliginosa =

Conservation status
- Least Concern (IUCN 3.1)

Scientific classification
- Kingdom: Fungi
- Division: Ascomycota
- Class: Lecanoromycetes
- Order: Peltigerales
- Family: Peltigeraceae
- Genus: Sticta
- Species: S. arachnofuliginosa

Binomial name
- Sticta arachnofuliginosa B.Moncada & Lücking (2012)

Species of lichen

Sticta arachnofuliginosa is a species of foliose lichen in the family Peltigeraceae. Found in Central America and South America, it was formally described by Bibiana Moncada and Robert Lücking in 2012. The type specimen was collected near the Laguna de Chisacá (Cundinamarca Department, Colombia) at an altitude of 3,734 m (12,251 ft). The lichen, which usually grows on bark but has also been recorded growing on soil, tends to associates with liverworts from the genera Metzgeria, Lepicolea, Plagiochila, as well as the lichen Heterodermia circinalis. It has been recorded from páramo, and temperate forests at elevations ranging from 2,300 and 4,050 m (7,550 and 13,290 ft). The specific epithet alludes to its resemblance to Sticta fuliginosa.
