= Sticta tainorum =

Scientific classification
- Domain: Eukaryota
- Kingdom: Fungi
- Division: Ascomycota
- Class: Lecanoromycetes
- Order: Peltigerales
- Family: Peltigeraceae
- Genus: Sticta
- Species: S. tainorum

Binomial name
- Sticta tainorum Merc.-Díaz & Lücking (2020)

Species of lichen

Sticta tainorum is a rare species of foliose lichen in the family Peltigeraceae. Found in Puerto Rico, it was formally described as a new species in 2020 by Joel Mercado‐Díaz and Robert Lücking. The type specimen was collected by the first author in Toro Negro State Forest at an elevation of 1,036 m (3,399 ft). It is only known to occur on a few trees in high-elevation forests on the eastern part of the island, near Pico Doña Juana. The specific epithet refers to the indigenous Taíno people.
