= Sticta macrocyphellata =

Conservation status
- Least Concern (IUCN 3.1)

Scientific classification
- Kingdom: Fungi
- Division: Ascomycota
- Class: Lecanoromycetes
- Order: Peltigerales
- Family: Peltigeraceae
- Genus: Sticta
- Species: S. macrocyphellata

Binomial name
- Sticta macrocyphellata B.Moncada & Coca (2013)

Species of lichen

Sticta macrocyphellata is a species of foliose lichen in the family Peltigeraceae. It is found in the Colombian Andes.

== Taxonomy ==
The lichen was formally described as a new species in by lichenologists Bibiana Moncada and Luis Fernando Coca. The type specimen was collected near Monte Zancudo (Tatamá National Natural Park, Risaralda) at an altitude of 2,800 m (9,200 ft). The species epithet alludes to the dense, sizable cyphellae that are highly visible across a significant portion of the underside.

In a time-calibrated chronogram of the phylogeny of the genus Sticta, Sticta macrocyphellata was most closely related to S. dilatata; these two species made up a clade that was sister to a clade containing S. papillata, and a species resembling S. subtomentella.

== Habitat and distribution ==
Sticta macrocyphellata typically grows in semi-exposed microsites in subandine to andine forests, at elevations ranging from 2,200 to 3,400 m (7,200 to 11,200 ft). This species has been recorded on the western slopes of the Cordillera Central, the eastern slopes of the Cordillera Oriental, and the Cordillera Occidental. Sticta macrocyphellata commonly grows on rocks and bark and is often associated with bryophytes such as Plagiochila, Lophocolea, Bazzania, Omphalanthus, and Macromitrium.
