= Sticta riparia =

Scientific classification
- Domain: Eukaryota
- Kingdom: Fungi
- Division: Ascomycota
- Class: Lecanoromycetes
- Order: Peltigerales
- Family: Peltigeraceae
- Genus: Sticta
- Species: S. riparia

Binomial name
- Sticta riparia Merc.-Díaz & Lücking (2020)

Species of lichen

Sticta riparia is a species of foliose lichen in the family Peltigeraceae. Found in Puerto Rico, it was formally described as a new species in 2020 by Joel Mercado‐Díaz and Robert Lücking. The type specimen was collected by the first author in San Cristóbal Canyon at an altitude of 465 m (1,526 ft); here it was found growing on the vertical surface of a rock by the river. Although most commonly encountered along riverbanks along the Cordillera Central, it has also been found in secondary forests. The specific epithet alludes to its riparian habitat.
