= Sticta parvilobata =

Scientific classification
- Domain: Eukaryota
- Kingdom: Fungi
- Division: Ascomycota
- Class: Lecanoromycetes
- Order: Peltigerales
- Family: Peltigeraceae
- Genus: Sticta
- Species: S. parvilobata

Binomial name
- Sticta parvilobata Merc.-Díaz & Lücking (2020)

Species of lichen

Sticta parvilobata is a species of foliose lichen in the family Peltigeraceae. Found in Puerto Rico, it was formally described as a new species in 2020 by Joel Mercado‐Díaz and Robert Lücking. The type specimen was collected along a trail to Monte Guilarte in the Guilarte State Forest (Guilarte, Adjuntas), at an altitude of 1,100 m (3,600 ft). The lichen is only known to occur in high-elevation forests at this location as well as the Toro Negro State Forest. The specific epithet parvilobata refers to the usually smaller lobes in mature specimens of this species, compared to its close relative Sticta ciliata.
