= Sticta harrisii =

Scientific classification
- Kingdom: Fungi
- Division: Ascomycota
- Class: Lecanoromycetes
- Order: Peltigerales
- Family: Peltigeraceae
- Genus: Sticta
- Species: S. harrisii

Binomial name
- Sticta harrisii Merc.-Díaz, Moncada & Lücking (2020)

Species of lichen

Sticta harrisii is a species of foliose lichen in the family Peltigeraceae. Found in Puerto Rico, it was formally described as a new species in 2020 by Joel Mercado‐Díaz, Bibiana Moncada, and Robert Lücking The type specimen was collected by the first author in El Yunque National Forest. The lichen is only known to occur in high-elevation forests at this location and also in Carite State Forest, where it typically grows as an epiphyte on Heterotrichum cymosum, Cecropia schreberian, vines, ferns, and occasionally on rocks. The specific epithet harrisii honours the American lichenologist Richard C. Harris, "who prepared the first formal taxonomic treatment of lichens for the island and the first key to species of Sticta in Puerto Rico".
