= Yoshimuriella peltigera =

Scientific classification
- Domain: Eukaryota
- Kingdom: Fungi
- Division: Ascomycota
- Class: Lecanoromycetes
- Order: Peltigerales
- Family: Peltigeraceae
- Genus: Yoshimuriella
- Species: Y. peltigera

Binomial name
- Yoshimuriella peltigera (Vain.) Lücking & B.Moncada (2018)

Synonyms
- Lobaria peltigera Vain. (1890)

Species of lichen

Yoshimuriella peltigera is a species of corticolous (bark-dwelling), foliose lichen in the family Peltigeraceae. It occurs in neotropical mountainous rainforests.

== Taxonomy ==
Yoshimuriella peltigera was originally described as Sticta peltigera by Dominique François Delise in 1825. However, this basionym was deemed illegitimate due to a misapplication of the type specimen, which was correctly assigned to Lichen dissectus. To resolve this, the name Lobaria peltigera was adopted by Edvard August Vainio in 1890, and this designation has been used to represent the species accurately.

The genus Yoshimuriella was established by Bibiana Moncada and Robert Lücking in 2013 to reclassify the Lobaria peltigera group, based on distinct morphological characteristics. Species within this genus have a green algal photobiont and vein-like lower tomentum.

Yoshimuriella peltigera is distinguished by its lobe structure, surface configuration, and vein patterns. The lobe surface is smooth to shallowly canaliculate, differing from the shallowly pitted surface of Yoshimuriella dissecta. Furthermore, Y. peltigera features an irregular vein pattern with secondary branches that do not precisely follow the lobe midrib, creating a zigzagging network. This characteristic vein pattern is a key differentiator among species within the genus.

The correct name for this species, based on Vainio's material from his Lichenes Brasilienses Exsiccati collection, is Yoshimuriella peltigera (Vain.) Lücking & Moncada. This new combination was proposed to retain the historically significant epithet "peltigera" while accurately reflecting the species' characteristics and phylogenetic relationships within the genus Yoshimuriella.

== Habitat and distribution ==
Yoshimuriella peltigera is found in well-preserved neotropical montane rainforests. It grows in the moist, humid conditions typical of these environments. The type specimen was collected by Vainio in Brazil, specifically in the region of Serra do Caraça, Minas Gerais, in 1885.
