= Sticta venosa =

Scientific classification
- Kingdom: Fungi
- Division: Ascomycota
- Class: Lecanoromycetes
- Order: Peltigerales
- Family: Peltigeraceae
- Genus: Sticta
- Species: S. venosa

Binomial name
- Sticta venosa Lücking, Moncada & Robayo (2011)

Species of lichen

Sticta venosa is a species of terricolous (ground-dwelling), foliose lichen in the family Peltigeraceae. It is known only from Pichincha Province, Ecuador, and from Colombia. It was described as new to science in 2011.

== Taxonomy ==
Sticta venosa was first formally described in 2011 by lichenologists Robert Lücking, Bibiana Moncada, and Javier Robayo. The type specimen was discovered by the first author in Río Guajalito Protected Forest, Ecuador, at an altitude of 1,800 m (5,900 ft), nestled among mosses in a montane rainforest. The species name venosa is derived from the prominent veins formed by the ridges and tomentum on the lower side of the lichen.

== Description ==
=== General features ===
The thallus of Sticta venosa can reach up to 15 cm (6 in) in diameter, with individual lobes extending up to 10 cm (4 in) long. The lobes are linear to slightly flabellate, 3–5 mm (0.12–0.20 in) wide, and exhibit extensive branching, especially near the tip. Both upper and lower surfaces of the lobes display strong and reticulate ridges, creating a faveolate appearance. The photobiont associated with Sticta venosa is from the cyanobacterial genus Nostoc.

The upper surface of the lobes is blue-grey with a brownish tinge when fresh, turning pale brownish-grey when dry. The lower surface is white to yellowish-white and glabrous, apart from thin lines of dark brown tomentum that grow atop the ridges and form distinct, thin, radiating veins. The lobe margins are highly incised and crenulate, with tufts of dark brown hairs emerging from the incisions, particularly at the lobe tips. Marginal isidia are also present, which are terete to flattened and unbranched to branched, bearing a resemblance to phyllidia.

=== Similar species ===
Apothecia have not been observed in this species, and no lichen products were detected through thin-layer chromatography analysis. Sticta venosa shares certain features with Sticta filicinella, particularly in its substrate and overall lobe morphology, including the cyanobacterial photobiont. However, Sticta venosa is considered the isidiate counterpart of Sticta filicinella due to its unique ridged and foveolate lobe surface and the tomentum on the lower side. This species bears a passing resemblance to some Peltigera and Lobaria species, specifically those in the L. peltigera group, but can be distinguished by its preference for living on land and the cyphellae present on the underside of the lobe.

== Habitat and distribution ==
At the time of its original publication, Sticta venosa was only known to occur in its type locality in Ecuador, where it thrives in the shaded understory of montane rainforests. It has since been found in the Chocó region of Valle del Cauca, in western Colombia. There, it was found growing amongst several other Sticta species at an elevation of 2,300 m (7,500 ft).
