= Sticta brevior =

Scientific classification
- Kingdom: Fungi
- Division: Ascomycota
- Class: Lecanoromycetes
- Order: Peltigerales
- Family: Peltigeraceae
- Genus: Sticta
- Species: S. brevior

Binomial name
- Sticta brevior B.Moncada & Lücking (2013)

Species of lichen-forming fungus

Sticta brevior is a species of lichen-forming fungus in the family Peltigeraceae. It is found in the Colombian Andes. It was described as new to science in 2013 from a specimen collected in Huila. The thallus is foliose (leafy), up to about 5 cm (2.0 in) across, with a pitted to wrinkled upper surface that is pale brown to reddish brown, and bears stalked apothecia (fruiting bodies) with reddish-orange to reddish-brown discs.

== Taxonomy ==
The lichen was formally described as a new species in 2013 by the lichenologists Bibiana Moncada and Robert Lücking. The type specimen was collected from the Vereda La Candelaria (La Plata, Huila) at an elevation of 2,300 m (7,500 ft).

In a time-calibrated chronogram of the phylogeny of the genus Sticta, Sticta brevior was most closely related to S. isidokunthii and a clade containing S. impressula, S. galowayana, and S. phyllidokunthii. Sticta pseudoimpressula, described as new to science from Bolivia in 2022, is also closely related.

== Description ==
Sticta brevior has an irregular to somewhat palm-shaped thallus up to about 5 cm (2 in) across, with overlapping lobes that are usually 10–25 mm (0.39–0.98 in) wide. The upper surface is pitted to wrinkled, glossy, and pale brown to reddish brown in herbarium material, often with scattered cream-colored patches. The lobe margins bear abundant true cilia, and the lower surface is pale to light brown with a dense, soft tomentum. Vegetative propagules are absent.

Its cyphellae are abundant, rounded to angular, and usually white to cream-colored, while the apothecia are common and mostly laminal. These apothecia are carried on distinct stalks and have a reddish-orange to reddish-brown disc with a tomentose margin bearing abundant pale trichomes, a feature that remains visible even in mature apothecia except right at the edge of the disc. The ascospores are hyaline, fusiform, and usually have one to three septa, with dimension of 30–40 x 7–8 μm.

== Habitat and distribution ==
Discovered in the Colombian Andes, Sticta brevior typically grows in semi-exposed microsites within subandine to andine forests bordering páramo vegetation at elevations ranging from 2,300 to 3,600 m (7,500 to 11,800 ft). It is predominantly found in the Cordillera Central and the Cordillera Occidental regions, spanning subandine to andine, and páramo regions. While it usually grows as an epiphyte, it may occasionally grow on the ground, often close to liverworts of the family Lejeuneaceae, and the genera Frullania and Jubula, as well as Sphagnum mosses. It has been also observed growing near the ground on Blechnum ferns.
