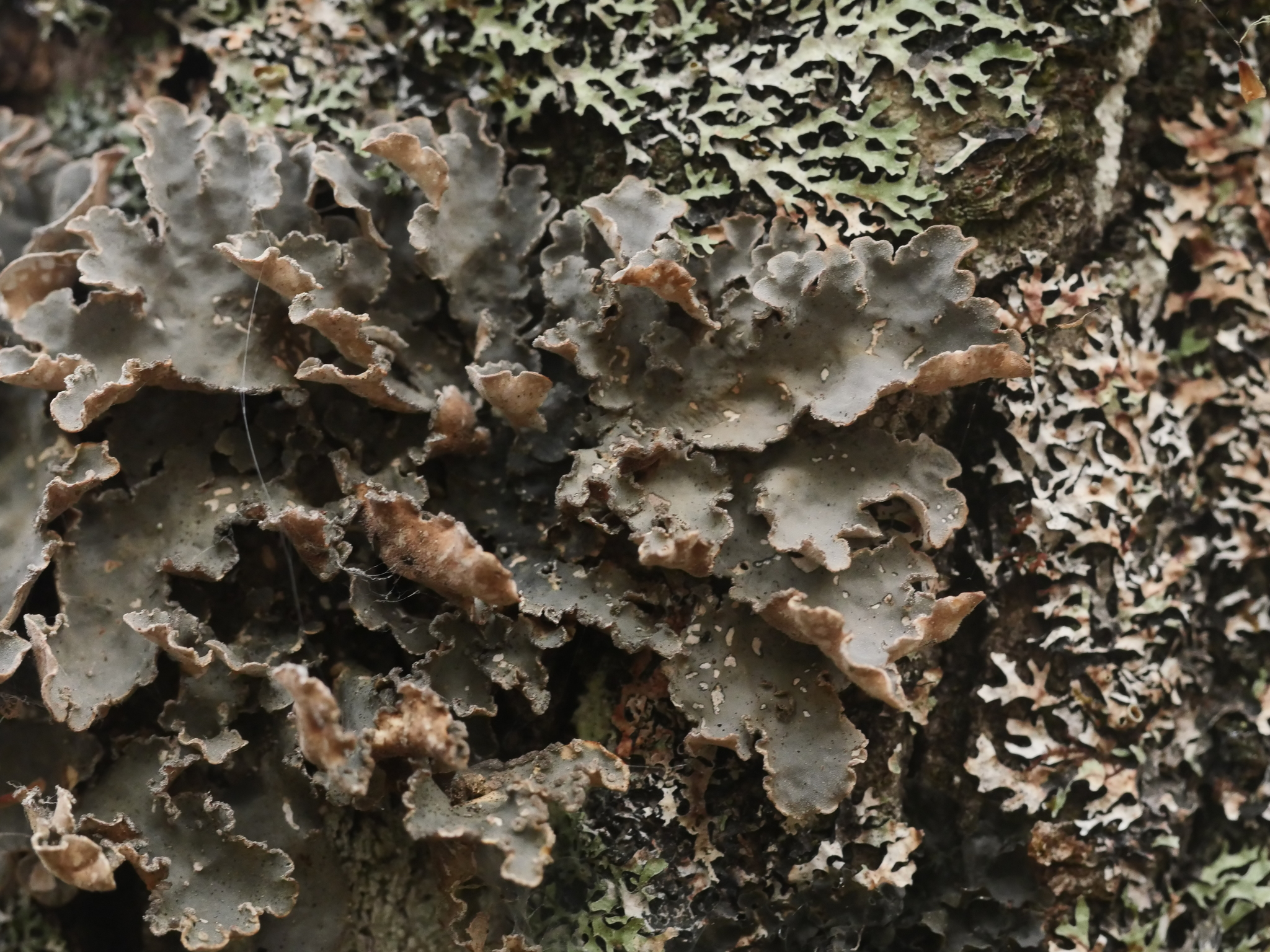
- Lobarina scrobiculata

Scientific classification
- Kingdom: Fungi
- Division: Ascomycota
- Class: Lecanoromycetes
- Order: Peltigerales
- Family: Peltigeraceae
- Genus: Lobarina; Nyl. ex Cromb. (1894)

Type species
- Lobarina scrobiculata (Scop.) Nyl. ex Cromb. (1894)

Species
- L. awasthiana L. horikawae L. luzonensis L. natalensis L. scrobiculata L. subretigera

= Lobarina =

Genus of lichens

Lobarina is a genus of lichen-forming fungi in the family Peltigeraceae. Lobarina resembles the related genus Lobaria in lobe arrangement and medullary chemistry, but its thallus has shallow pits and a markedly denser tomentum on the underside, leaving white, rounded patches that do not align with the surface depressions. The genus occurs mostly in temperate and tropical mountain forests of the Northern Hemisphere, where species grow on tree bark in moist, shaded environments. Members of Lobarina are cyanolichens, meaning they partner with cyanobacteria that can fix nitrogen from the air. These lichens are particularly vulnerable to grazing by snails and slugs, which can consume entire thalli within days.

== Taxonomy ==
Nylander first proposed Lobarina in 1877 to accommodate the "Stictina scrobiculata" element, but he gave no validating description; the name is therefore treated as invalid (nomen nudum) under the botanical code, with the intended type linked to Lobarina scrobiculata (Scop.) Nyl. He revisited the name in 1889 for Lobarina retigera (Bory) Nyl., again without a validating description, so that usage is likewise invalid under the same Article. The genus was finally put into valid form by James Crombie in 1894, who separated it from Stictina (Stictina is a rejected/illegitimate name; its species are treated in Pseudocyphellaria) on morphology, emphasising the scrobiculate upper surface, the absence of cyphellae beneath, a tomentose lower surface with pale naked "gibbae", lecanorine apothecia and ascospores with three septa.

After Crombie's valid publication in 1894, most authors subsumed the group within a broad Lobaria until Yoshimura's late-1990s reinstatement of Lobarina on morphological and chemical grounds; a 2013 three-gene phylogeny then corroborated its status as an independent lineage within Lobariaceae (then treated as a family; many recent works treat this as subfamily Lobarioideae of an expanded Peltigeraceae). In that analysis, the traditional, catch-all Lobaria (in the loose sense, sensu lato) breaks into several clades that also include Ricasolia, Yoshimuriella, Lobariella, and others; Lobarina is recovered as a distinct lineage within this complex, with Lobarina scrobiculata as the type species. The same study explains why the presence or absence of cyphellae/pseudocyphellae is an unreliable generic boundary across the family and argues for recognising smaller, morphologically coherent genera.

In that framework, Lobarina is set apart by a suite of characters: scrobiculate lobes; a very dense lower tomentum that leaves pale, rounded holes on the thallus underside which do not match the shallow pits on the upper surface; a cortex containing usnic acid (otherwise not found in Lobariaceae); and a medulla with the stictic/norstictic-acid chemosyndrome (including meta- and para-scrobiculin). Its ascospores tend to be narrowly fusiform to acicular and longer than those typical of Lobaria. These distinctions justify treating Lobarina as a genus rather than folding it back into a broad Lobaria.

== Ecology ==
Laboratory feeding trials using the type species, Lobarina scrobiculata, showed that herbivory by gastropods (slugs and snails) can be intense and selective. In a multiple-choice experiment, the introduced banded grove snail (Cepaea nemoralis) was allowed to graze epiphytic lichen transplants mounted on maple sticks. After first exhausting the chlorolichen Platismatia glauca, the snails switched to Lobarina scrobiculata and Lobaria pulmonaria. Across two trials, L. scrobiculata lost roughly four-fifths of its dry mass on average, and about half of the test thalli were completely eaten within five days.

The study also documented which parts of the thallus were targeted: L. scrobiculata often showed white-rimmed holes right through the cortex and medulla, and its soralia (the powdery reproductive patches) were frequently grazed. That pattern, heavy feeding on reproductive structures, led the authors to question how broadly the "optimal defence" idea applies to lichens (i.e., the expectation that reproductive tissues are better defended chemically).

Chemical context from the same work helps explain, but not fully predict, this palatability. Lobarina scrobiculata had a higher proportion of acetone-extractable secondary metabolites than P. glauca, yet was still readily consumed once the preferred P. glauca was gone; the authors note that relationships between compound profiles (e.g., stictic acid–type chemistry in Lobariaceae) and grazing are complex and can vary with thallus condition. Overall, they infer that non-native gastropods may be influencing the abundance and distribution of epiphytic cyanolichens such as Lobarina in Newfoundland and Labrador.

== Species ==
- Lobarina awasthiana Räsänen (1950) – India
- Lobarina horikawae Inumaru (1941) – Japan
- Lobarina luzonensis Räsänen (1949) – Philippines
- Lobarina natalensis Räsänen (1949) – South Africa
- Lobarina scrobiculata (Scop.) Nyl. ex Cromb. (1894) – widespread
- Lobarina subretigera Inumaru (1941) – Japan

Sunao Inumaru (1943) used the combination Lobarina isidiosa (Vain.) Inum. when proposing the forma fuscovillosa, but that usage is treated as nomen invalidum; the taxon is generally cited as Lobaria isidiosa.
