= Sticta borinquensis =

Scientific classification
- Domain: Eukaryota
- Kingdom: Fungi
- Division: Ascomycota
- Class: Lecanoromycetes
- Order: Peltigerales
- Family: Peltigeraceae
- Genus: Sticta
- Species: S. borinquensis

Binomial name
- Sticta borinquensis Merc.-Díaz & Lücking (2020)

Species of lichen

Sticta borinquensis is a species of foliose lichen in the family Peltigeraceae. Found in Puerto Rico, it was formally described as a new species in 2020 by Joel Mercado‐Díaz and Robert Lücking. The type specimen was collected by the first author on the El Toro Trail leading to Pico El Toro (Guzmán Arriba Barrio, Río Grande municipality). Its centre of distribution is the high-elevation forests in the eastern part of the island, particularly in El Yunque National Forest, where it grows as an epiphyte in shaded and humid habitats. The specific epithet refers to "Borinquen", which means "Puerto Rico" in the Taíno language.
