= Sticta tunjensis =

Conservation status
- Vulnerable (IUCN 3.1)

Scientific classification
- Kingdom: Fungi
- Division: Ascomycota
- Class: Lecanoromycetes
- Order: Peltigerales
- Family: Peltigeraceae
- Genus: Sticta
- Species: S. tunjensis

Binomial name
- Sticta tunjensis B.Moncada & Lücking (2012)

Species of lichen

Sticta tunjensis is a species of foliose lichen in the family Peltigeraceae. Found in Colombia, it was formally described by Bibiana Moncada and Robert Lücking in 2012. The type specimen was collected in Barón Germania (Tunja, Boyacá Department) at an altitude between 3,065–3,085 metres (10,056–10,121 ft). The lichen is only known to occur in the Andes of Colombia at altitudes between 1,900 and 3,080 metres (6,230 and 10,100 ft). It has been found growing on both bark and on soil, and it often grows among liverworts in genus Plagiochila. The specific epithet tunjensis refers to the type locality. Sticta tunjensis is somewhat similar to Sticta weigelii in morphological features, but it is phylogenetically distinct.
