= Dendriscocaulon =

Genus of lichen

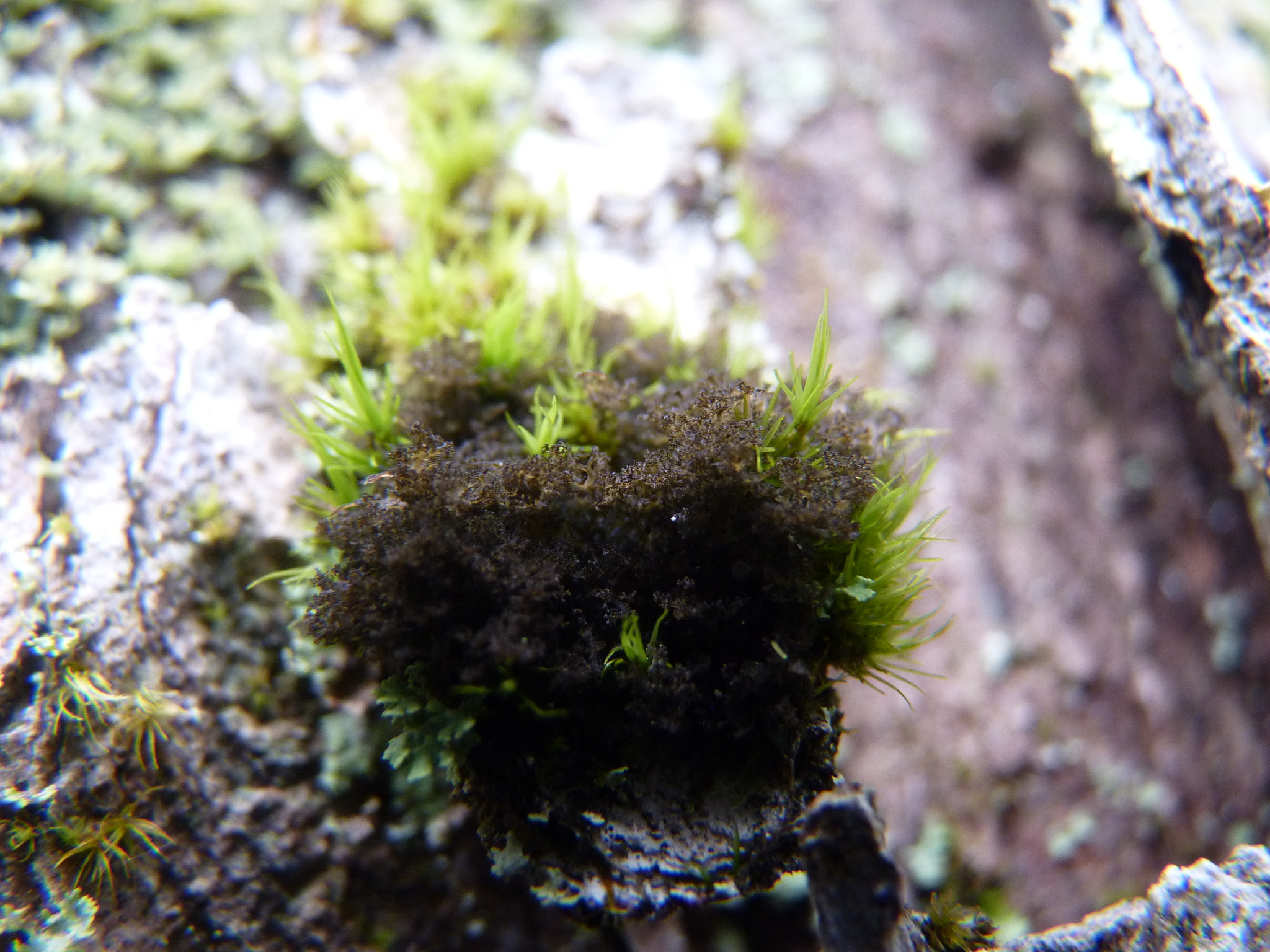

Dendriscocaulon is a taxonomic name that has been used for a genus of fruticose lichen (shrubby form lichen) with a cyanobacteria as the photobiont partner of the fungus. Dendriscocaulon is considered a taxonomic synonym of the genus Sticta, a foliose lichen (leafy form lichen), which generally has a green alga as the photobiont partner. Lichens that have been called Dendriscocaulon or Sticta involve the same fungal species. They show dramatically different morphology, may grow side-by-side, and mixed forms exist where different algae are growing within different portions of the same fungal thallus. The biochemistry of the two forms is very different, but the DNA sequences from the fungus and the photobiont can be distinguished using different primers for DNA sequencing.

== Use of the name ==
Taxonomists now write the genus name with scare quotes around it, to make clear that they are not accepting the name as correct. The name can be convenient, however, because of the visible morphological difference, and because it was used in older literature.

The International Code of Botanical Nomenclature states that "For nomenclatural purposes names given to lichens apply to their fungal component." Names of genera and species are based on type specimens. The type of Dendriscocaulon Nyl. from New Zealand, published in 1888, is not the same as the type of Sticta (Schreb.) Ach., published in 1803. The fungal partner in the type specimen of Dendriscocaulon is therefore unlikely to be the same strain as the fungal partner in the type specimen of Sticta, which raises the possibility that at some future time the two genera may be separated once more on the basis of genetic difference in the fungal partner, rather than by the photobiont or the morphology of the lichen. As with all lichens, the convention of nomenclature provides only partial illumination about the concepts of genus and species as they apply to the association of two or more species that are known as lichens.
