= Sticta densiphyllidiata =

Scientific classification
- Domain: Eukaryota
- Kingdom: Fungi
- Division: Ascomycota
- Class: Lecanoromycetes
- Order: Peltigerales
- Family: Peltigeraceae
- Genus: Sticta
- Species: S. densiphyllidiata

Binomial name
- Sticta densiphyllidiata Merc.-Díaz & Lücking (2020)

Species of lichen

Sticta densiphyllidiata is a species of foliose lichen in the family Peltigeraceae. Found in Puerto Rico, it was formally described as a new species in 2020 by Joel Mercado‐Díaz and Robert Lücking. The type specimen was collected by the authors along a trail in El Yunque National Forest (Mameyes II, Río Grande), at an altitude of 909 m (2,982 ft).The lichen is common in the rainforests on the eastern part of the island, where it thrives in humid and shaded habitats. It grows on rocks but the authors note that it could also grow as an epiphyte. The specific epithet densiphyllidiata refers to the dense distribution of branched phyllidia (vegetative propagules) that occur along the margins of the lobes.
