= Sticta alpinotropica =

Conservation status
- Endangered (IUCN 3.1)

Scientific classification
- Kingdom: Fungi
- Division: Ascomycota
- Class: Lecanoromycetes
- Order: Peltigerales
- Family: Peltigeraceae
- Genus: Sticta
- Species: S. alpinotropica

Binomial name
- Sticta alpinotropica Aptroot (2008)

Species of lichen

Sticta alpinotropica is a species of saxicolous (rock-dwelling) lichen in the family Peltigeraceae. Found in Papua New Guinea, it was formally described as a new species in 2008 by Dutch lichenologist André Aptroot. The type specimen was collected by the author from the alpine lichen zone on the southeast slope of Mount Wilhelm at an altitude of 4,200 m (13,800 ft). Although it is abundant locally, it is only known to occur at the type locality, where it grows on siliceous rocks and on soil. Because of its small population and extremely limited geographical distribution, it is predicted to be quite vulnerable to potentially deleterious effects of climate change.

== Description ==
The thallus of Sticta alpinotropica reaches 1–4 cm (0.4–1.6 in) in diameter and 1 cm (0.4 in) high, attached to the substrate by a central stalk. The thallus comprises irregularly branched lobes, which are mostly 0.7–2.4 mm wide and 0.1–0.3 mm thick. The upper surface of the thallus is dark chocolate to blackish brown, glossy, and often has shallow reticulations and pits. The lower surface is black and covered with a short felty layer of rhizinae, which are 50–150 μm long and mostly dichotomously branched. The lobes have much incised margins with pockets of isidia projecting upwards and sideways. The rhizines are made up of one row of isodiametric, thick-walled cells, which are about 10 μm in diameter, brown below, and tapering to about 5 μm in diameter. The cyphellae are ochraceous inside, 0.2–0.4 mm deep, and 0.2–0.8 mm wide, with a slightly raised margin that is glossy dark brown to black and 0.1 mm wide. Apothecia, which are occasionally present, are sessile on a small stipe at the tips of lobes, 0.5–5.0 mm wide, and 0.3–1.7 mm high. The chemistry of this lichen does not contain any lichen products, but it has a strong fish-like odour that persists even after 20 years.
