= Sticta guilartensis =

Scientific classification
- Domain: Eukaryota
- Kingdom: Fungi
- Division: Ascomycota
- Class: Lecanoromycetes
- Order: Peltigerales
- Family: Peltigeraceae
- Genus: Sticta
- Species: S. guilartensis

Binomial name
- Sticta guilartensis Merc.-Díaz & Lücking (2020)

Species of lichen

Sticta guilartensis is a species of foliose lichen in the family Peltigeraceae. Found in Puerto Rico, it was formally described as a new species in 2020 by Joel Mercado‐Díaz and Robert Lücking. The type specimen was collected by the first author on the trail to Monte Guilarte (Guilarte, Adjuntas) at an altitude of 1,100 m (3,600 ft). It is only known to occur at this single locality, where it grows on rocks and on roots and trunks of trees, often with bryophytes, in shaded and humid habitats. The specific epithet refers to the name of the forest at the type locality, Bosque Estatal de Guilarte.
