= Emmanuelia lobulifera =

Scientific classification
- Kingdom: Fungi
- Division: Ascomycota
- Class: Lecanoromycetes
- Order: Peltigerales
- Family: Peltigeraceae
- Genus: Emmanuelia
- Species: E. lobulifera

Binomial name
- Emmanuelia lobulifera (B.Moore) Ant.Simon & Goffinet (2020)

Synonyms
- Lobaria lobulifera B.J.Moore (1969)

Species of lichen

Emmanuelia lobulifera is a species of foliose lichen in the family Peltigeraceae. It has a trebouxioid alga as the primary photobiont.. E. lobulifera can be distinguished from other species in the genus by differences in positions and shape of phyllidia, and by its geographic distribution.

== Habitat and distribution ==
The primary habitat for Emmanuelia lobulifera is the Southeastern United States, living on hardwood trees within coastal plains, found in Florida, Georgia, and South Carolina.

== Description ==
The thallus is up to 8 cm in diameter, with small overlapping lobes, each 1 mm to 5mm wide. The upper surface is light green to brownish grey and the underside is smooth, whitish, and sparsely tomentose. The ends of the lobes are short and rounded and may be joined together with plain margins. The scale-shaped phyllidia are typically between ~0.5 mm and 1 mm in diameter and cover the thallus surface except at the margins; they are obliquely oriented, rarely branching at the base.
