= Sticta corymbosa =

Scientific classification
- Domain: Eukaryota
- Kingdom: Fungi
- Division: Ascomycota
- Class: Lecanoromycetes
- Order: Peltigerales
- Family: Peltigeraceae
- Genus: Sticta
- Species: S. corymbosa

Binomial name
- Sticta corymbosa Merc.-Díaz & Lücking (2020)

Species of lichen

Sticta corymbosa is a species of foliose lichen in the family Peltigeraceae. Found in Puerto Rico, it was formally described as a new species in 2020 by Joel Mercado‐Díaz and Robert Lücking. The type specimen was collected by the first author in the El Yunque National Forest at the summit of Pico El Toro (Las Piedras) at an altitude of 1,048 m (3,438 ft). It is only known to occur at the type locality, where it grows as an epiphyte in humid and open to partially shaded habitats. The specific epithet refers to the corymbose (clustered) isidia found along the margins of the lobes.
