= Sticta aongstroemii =

Scientific classification
- Domain: Eukaryota
- Kingdom: Fungi
- Division: Ascomycota
- Class: Lecanoromycetes
- Order: Peltigerales
- Family: Peltigeraceae
- Genus: Sticta
- Species: S. aongstroemii

Binomial name
- Sticta aongstroemii Dal Forno, Moncada & Lücking (2018)

Species of lichen

Sticta aongstroemii is a species of corticolous (bark-dwelling, foliose lichen in the family Peltigeraceae. It is found in the southern part of the Atlantic Forest of Brazil.

== Taxonomy ==
The lichen was formally described in 2018 by Manuela Dal-Forno, Bibiana Moncada, and Robert Lücking. It has previously been included in the broadly defined concept of Sticta damicornis, but various molecular phylogenetic studies showed that there were multiple distinct cryptic species included under this name. S. aongstroemii was actually first described by Johannes Müller Argoviensis in 1881 as S. laciniata var. trichophora, based on collections made from Minas Gerais and Rio de Janeiro. However, the varietal epithet trichophora has been used as the species epithet for an unrelated species of Sticta by Edvard August Vainio in 1913, so Müller's usage is "blocked", and thus the replacement name, Sticta aongstroemii was proposed. The new epithet honours Swedish bryologist Johan Ångström, who collected the type specimen.

== Description ==
Sticta aongstroemii is distinguished from other green algal-partnering Sticta species because of its unique characteristics. These include lobes with parallel edges that are laciniate (edges of the lobes having many fine, finger-like projections) and have tips that range from rounded to tapering. Additionally, it has densely packed marginal apothecia that are contrasting with the noticeable, whitish cyphellae. Moreover, Sticta aongstroemii has a branching pattern that is anisotomous (a branching pattern where the lobes grow at different angles) and the lobes are growing at an angle of approximately 45–60°. Furthermore, it has a thin but distinct, dark brown lower tomentum.
