= Sticta emmanueliana =

Scientific classification
- Domain: Eukaryota
- Kingdom: Fungi
- Division: Ascomycota
- Class: Lecanoromycetes
- Order: Peltigerales
- Family: Peltigeraceae
- Genus: Sticta
- Species: S. emmanueliana

Binomial name
- Sticta emmanueliana Moncada, Lücking & Lumbsch (2020)

Species of lichen

Sticta emmanueliana is a species of foliose lichen in the family Peltigeraceae. Found in Hawaii, it was described as a new species in 2020 by Bibiana Moncada, Robert Lücking, and H. Thorsten Lumbsch. The specific epithet honours the Belgian lichenologist Emmanuël Sérusiaux, "on the occasion of his official retirement from formal duties".

The lichen is a small species with a short stipe that forms small lobes with isidia on the margins, and black cilia. It grows on bark covered in mats of bryophytes. Its photobiont partner is a cyanobacterium in the genus Nostoc. The type was collected on the western slopes of Mount Waiʻaleʻale on the island of Kauaʻi. There, it is found on shaded tree bark in relatively undisturbed forest at mid elevations, between 1,000 and 1,500 m (3,300 and 4,900 ft).
