= Cyphella digitalis =

Scientific classification
- Kingdom: Fungi
- Division: Basidiomycota
- Class: Agaricomycetes
- Order: Agaricales
- Family: Cyphellaceae
- Genus: Cyphella
- Species: C. digitalis

Binomial name
- Cyphella digitalis (Alb. & Schwein.) Fr. (1822)

Species of fungus

Cyphella digitalis is a small fungal species from the genus Cyphella, found throughout many western European wooded forests

== Taxonomy ==
This species was first described in 1805, by Lewis David de Schweinitz, which was then also backed by Johannes Baptista von Albertini in 1822. Further identification was made in 2016 by Jan Holec, Vladimir Kunca, Martin Kříž, and Petr Zehnálek, which located Cyphella digitalis populations in Slovakia and the Czech Republic as part of a study looking into the genetic sequencing and ecology of the species.

== Description ==
This species is identified with small, tube like basidiomata in circular to oval shaping. It has a cream, beige, or darker brown coloration, sometimes with tree bark like patterns and streaking on the outside of the structures. They appear to be hygrophanous, turning a darker shade in the presence of water. The inside of the body is typically a lighter cream to whitened color. Appears as a thin tube clumped closely together in clusters, with each individual cup growing up to 10-15 mm in diameter. They have no visible stipe and are typically rooted by either the base of the cup or one side, then hanging free from that rooted area. Cyphella digitalis has a distinct lack of gills and has a somewhat flexible membrane.

== Habitat and location ==
Found mostly through Germany, Austria, Switzerland, Denmark, the Czech Republic, and Slovakia, Cyphella digitalis can be located dominantly on silver fir trees. It is almost exclusive found on these silver fir trees, due to a reliant symbiotic relationship, however has been observed in rare cases to be seen in Denmark without the Silver fir trees present. This observation has not been confirmed since initially being described.

== Etymology ==
The specific epithet digitalis is derived literally as a modern latin translation of German "thimble", or literally, "finger-hat". This refers to the shaping and structure of the basidiomata and body of the fungi.
