= Vetaforma =

Scientific classification
- Kingdom: Plantae
- Clade: Embryophytes
- Division: Marchantiophyta
- Class: Jungermanniopsida
- Order: Lepidoziales
- Family: Lepicoleaceae
- Genus: Vetaforma; Fulford & J. Taylor
- Species: V. dusenii

Binomial name
- Vetaforma dusenii (Steph.) Fulford & J. Taylor

Synonyms
- Blepharostoma dusenii (Steph.) Steph.; Lepicolea abnormis Steph.; Lepidozia dusenii Steph.; Temnoma dusenii (Steph.) R.M.Schust.

Genus of liverworts

Vetaforma is a genus of liverworts found only in Argentina and Chile, and contains a single species Vetaforma dusenii. It is classified in the order Jungermanniales. It was placed as the only member of the family Vetaformaceae within that order, but this family has been merged into the family Lepicoleaceae based on morphological and genetic data. The genus name was originally published in 1960, but this publication was invalid under Article 36.1 of the International Code of Nomenclature for algae, fungi, and plants. The single species was first described in 1900 as Lepidozia dusenii and transferred to Vetaforma in 1962.
