= Sinuicella =

Scientific classification
- Domain: Eukaryota
- Kingdom: Fungi
- Division: Ascomycota
- Class: Lecanoromycetes
- Order: Peltigerales
- Family: Peltigeraceae
- Genus: Sinuicella; D.F.Stone, McCune & Miądl. (2021)
- Species: S. denisonii

Binomial name
- Sinuicella denisonii D.F.Stone, McCune & Miądl. (2021)

Species of lichen

Sinuicella is a fungal genus in the family Peltigeraceae. It is a monotypic genus, containing the single species Sinuicella denisonii. Both the genus and species were described as new to science in 2021 by Daphne Stone, Bruce McCune, and Jolanta Miądlikowska. The type specimen was collected by the first author from Polk County, Oregon (USA), where it was found growing on the soil. It is only known to occur in the region of the type locality. The lichen has a minute fruticose (bushy) grey to almost black thallus. The photobiont partner is a member of the cyanobacterial genus Nostoc. The genus name Sinuicella refers to the cortical cells with curved protrusions in their outlines, somewhat resembling jigsaw puzzle pieces. The specific epithet denisonii honours mycologist William C. Denison, who was, according to the authors, "a pioneer in the use of lichens to monitor air quality in the United States."
