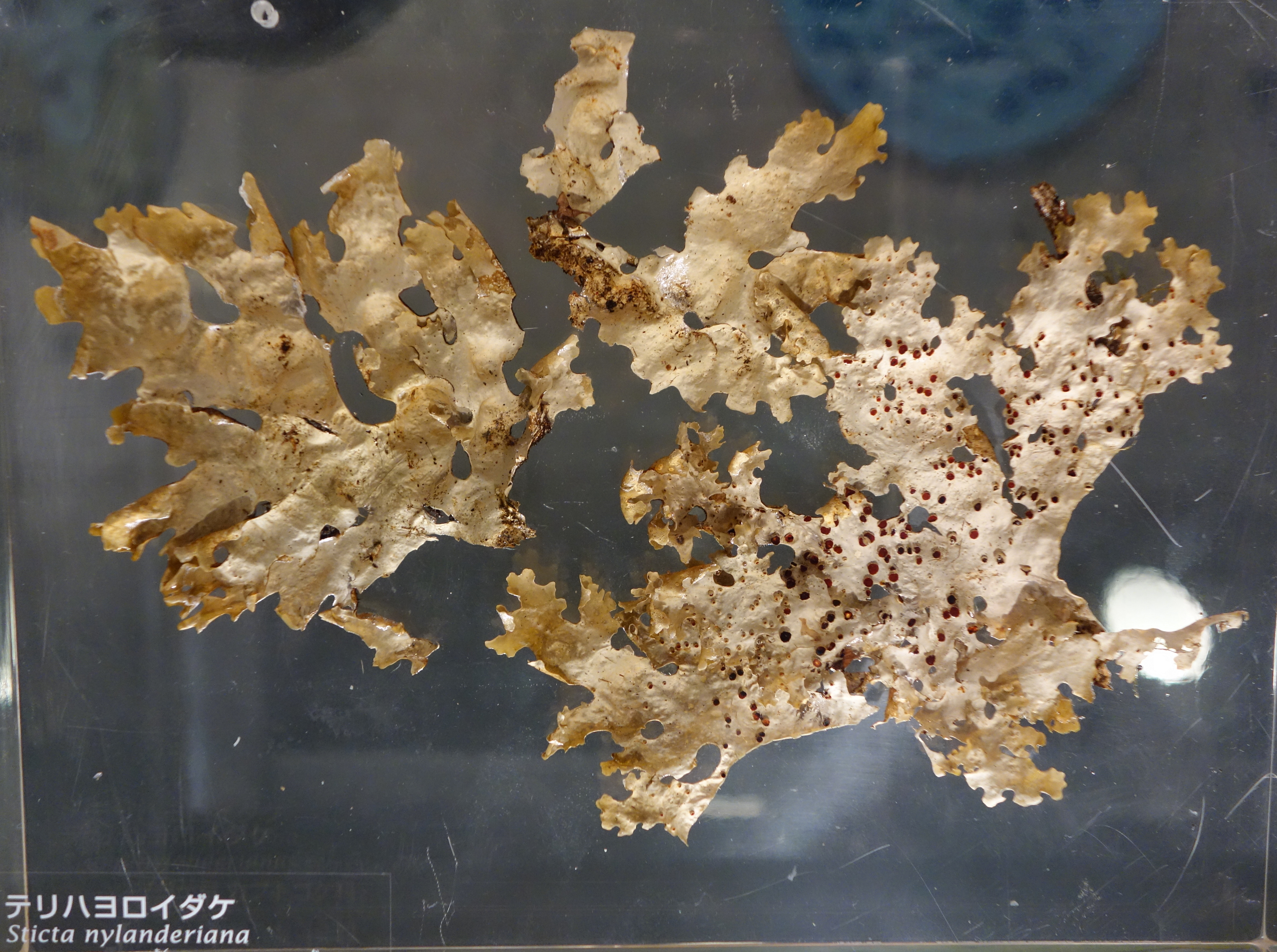
- Museum specimen of Dendriscosticta platyphylla (labelled as a synonym, Sticta nylanderiana))

Scientific classification
- Kingdom: Fungi
- Division: Ascomycota
- Class: Lecanoromycetes
- Order: Peltigerales
- Family: Peltigeraceae
- Genus: Dendriscosticta; Moncada & Lücking (2013)

Type species
- Dendriscosticta wrightii (Tuck.) Moncada & Lücking (2013)

Species
- See text

= Dendriscosticta =

Genus of lichens

Dendriscosticta is a genus of foliose lichens in the family Peltigeraceae. The genus contains ten species that grow primarily on tree bark and branches across much of the Northern Hemisphere. Species are divided into two main groups based on their chemistry and geography: an Eastern Hemisphere lineage that produces gyrophoric acid and a mostly Western Hemisphere lineage that typically lacks this compound. These lichens often develop small outgrowths (isidia or phyllidia) on their upper surface and can form special structures harbouring cyanobacteria.

== Taxonomy ==
Dendriscosticta was circumscribed in 2013 for the Sticta wrightii species group on the basis of a three-gene phylogeny (using the genetic markers mtSSU, nuLSU, ITS) of the Lobariaceae. In that analysis, the S. wrightii group did not belong with Sticta in the strict sense: instead, it formed a well-supported lineage embedded within Lobaria (in the loose sense), as sister to the neotropical Yoshimuriella clade and the maculate/pseudocyphellate Lobariella clade. The molecular tree and the gene-by-gene topologies underpin this placement. Morphologically, Dendriscosticta differs from Sticta not just in not only in often having cyphelloid pores on the lower surface, but, more reliably, by the presence of algae in the excipular tissue of its apothecia; pore rim form is variable and not consistently diagnostic. Species often produce isidiate- to phyllidiate chloromorphs and frequently develop dendriscocauloid cyanomorphs (hence the genus name).

Subsequent global sampling and a four-locus phylogeny (ITS, RPB1, EF-1α, MCM7) corroborated the placement of Dendriscosticta outside Sticta sensu stricto and resolved two well-supported lineages that largely mirror chemistry: a D. wrightii clade lacking gyrophoric acid and a D. praetextata clade in which gyrophoric acid is present. That study expanded the genus to nine species by describing D. gelida and D. phyllidiata, transferring D. hookeri, D. insinuans and D. yatabeana into Dendriscosticta, and designating epitypes for D. wrightii and D. yatabeana to stabilise usage; it also clarified that the 2013 use of "D. platyphylla" was nomenclaturally inapplicable, with Lobaria hookeri Trevis. the correct basionym for the hookeri complex. Several taxa are morphologically cryptic, and the authors provide short ITS2 mini-barcodes that separate the species recognised.

== Chemistry ==
Chemically, an Eastern Hemisphere lineage (the D. platyphylla clade) characteristically contains gyrophoric acid, whereas most Western Hemisphere species, including D. wrightii, tend to lack lichen substances in the medulla; these are patterns that mirror the generic-level relationships recovered in the tree. A chemical analysis of the widely distributed tropical species Dendriscosticta platyphylloides revealed six known secondary metabolites: 15a-acetoxyhopan-22-ol, hopane-15a,22-diol, zeorin, cerevisterol, salvigenin, and 5-hydroxy-3',4',7-trimethoxyflavone.

== Habitat and distribution ==
Species of Dendriscosticta are foliose epiphytes that grow mainly on the bark and branches of trees, only rarely occurring on mossy rocks or logs. At a broad scale the genus is a Northern Hemisphere group. Phylogeographic structure mirrors chemistry, with an Eastern Hemisphere praetextata clade whose species produce gyrophoric acid and a mostly Western Hemisphere wrightii clade whose species typically lack medullary substances.

Within the wrightii clade, D. gelida is the most widespread species, occurring throughout the Holarctic, and many North American (and probably some European) records formerly referred to D. wrightii belong to this taxon. D. gelida can occur together with D. oroborealis, for example in British Columbia. In the praetextata clade, D. phyllidiata appears restricted to Taiwan, whereas D. praetextata is centred in the eastern Himalaya (northern India and southern China). Earlier analyses had already suggested an Eastern platyphylla/praetextata lineage and a mostly Western wrightii lineage, anticipating this hemispheric pattern. Overall, the genus spans much of the Holarctic, with some species narrowly endemic and others broadly distributed.

== Ecology ==
Ajaysinghia dendriscostictae is a lichenicolous (lichen-dwelling) fungus that has been recorded growing on Dendriscosticta praetextata in Central Himalaya. Another lichenicolous species, Sclerococcum dendriscostictae, grows on Dendriscosticta in Uttarakhand, India.

== Species ==
As of October 2025, Species Fungorum (in the Catalogue of Life) accepts ten species of Dendriscosticta:

- Dendriscosticta gelida Ant.Simon, Goward & T.Sprib. (2021)
- Dendriscosticta hookeri (Trevis.) Moncada & Lücking (2021)
- Dendriscosticta insinuans (Nyl.) Ant.Simon, Magain & Sérus. (2021)
- Dendriscosticta oroborealis (Goward & Tønsberg) B.Moncada & Lücking (2013)
- Dendriscosticta phyllidiata Ant.Simon, Goffinet & Sérus. (2021)
- Dendriscosticta platyphylla (Trevis.) B.Moncada & Lücking (2013)
- Dendriscosticta platyphylloides (Nyl.) B.Moncada & Lücking (2013)
- Dendriscosticta praetextata (Räsänen) B.Moncada & Lücking (2013)
- Dendriscosticta wrightii (Tuck.) B.Moncada & Lücking (2013)
- Dendriscosticta yatabeana (Müll.Arg.) Ant.Simon, Goffinet & Sérus. (2021)
