= Lepicoleaceae =

Scientific classification
- Kingdom: Plantae
- Division: Marchantiophyta
- Class: Jungermanniopsida
- Order: Lepidoziales
- Family: Lepicoleaceae; R.M.Schust.

Synonyms
- Vetaformataceae Fulford et J.Taylor, 1963

Family of liverworts belonging to the order Jungermanniales

Lepicoleaceae is a family of liverworts belonging to the order Jungermanniales.

Natural compounds, lignans, have been found in liverworts in the Lepicoleaceae family.

Genera:

- Lepicolea Dumort.
- Vetaforma Fulford & J.Taylor

== Introduction ==
Lepicoleaceae is a family of bryophyte plants, constituted by one genus, Lepicolea Dumort, pertaining to the order Jungermanniopsida. In Brazil, its distribution is restricted to the area of Atlantic forest of Santa Catarina, but it can also be encountered in other countries of Latin America, like Peru and Chile, and on other continents, like Africa. In general, they are present in regions of Atlantic forest and in mixed forest vegetation of the type which prefers shade and humidity, where there is a substrate of trees and branches. They are hepatics of medium size, being green, brown or reddish, and they possess a leafy life form. It is considered a primitive family of Hepaticae, and which associates itself with different vegetal families.

== Morphology ==
They are median hepatics, ascending, erect or hanging which can present green, brown or reddish colour. In some cases, they can possess a base lying flat like a rhizome, ramified irregularly, their stems are characterised by a transverse section without explicit differentiation between the cortical and interior cells. The rhizoids when present are dispersed in tufts in the base of the leafy appendages or in the undifferentiated matter. They are dioecious, with gametocytes in elongated shoots and antheridia on the axis of the bracts. The sporophyte is wrapped in a perianth and its vegetal reproduction is unknown. In addition, they may possess ventral branches, often flagelliform, and transverse or interleaved.

== Chemical components ==
Lepicoleaceae have been considered a primitive family in the Hepaticae being able to be associated with the Ptilidiaceae and Mastigophoraceae families. Little is known about the chemical components present in plants of this group, there being two of them: frullanolide and dihydrofrullanolide, identified as principal components. Later was related the presence of sesquiterpenoide ledol, sesquiterpenoides of type aromadendrene and seco-aromadendrene were also identified.

== Distribution ==
Its distribution is native, not endemic to Brazil. It occurs in the Atlantic forest and mixed vegetation of the forest which prefers shade and humidity, with geographic distribution in the south of the country, in the state of Santa Catarina. In Brazil, only one species pertaining to the Lepicoleaceae family named Lepicolea ochroleuca (Spreng.) Spruce was registered. Brazilian state where occurrence of the Lepicoleaceae family was registered: Santa Catarina. The species L. ramenrifissa, L. rigida and L. ochroleuca occur in Central and South America, L. ochroleuca also can be encountered on the African continent. The species L. scolopendra has been registered in Australia, New Zealand, Tasmania, Oceania and South America. In Asia, L. yakusimensis and L. loriana have been registered, which beyond Asia occur in Oceania. To finish, L. attenuata occurs in New Zealand and L. pruinosa in the Andes.

== Taxonomic diversity ==
Lepicoleaceae is within the order Jungermanniopsida, genus Lepicolea Dumort. Plants of this genus present ramified stems, lateral ramification, no dichotomy, absence of flagelliform branches, not deciduous, asexual and anacrogynous growth. It occurs principally in environments which are arid, mountainous and rocky features, being frequently observed in trunks of trees. There are 11 species known pertaining to the genus Lepicolea Dumort, they are Lepicolea attenuata, Lepicolea bidentula, Lepicolea magellanica, Lepicolea norrisii, Lepicolea ochroleuca, Lepicolea pruinosa, Lepicolea ramenifissa, Lepicolea rara, Lepicolea rigida, Lepicolea scolopendra and Lepicolea yakushimensis.

== Phylogenetic relationships ==
The phylogenetic relationships of this family were reconstructed by means of the region of the chloroplast trnL-F, nuclear ITS2 and 27 morphological characteristics. By this means, it was possible to infer that Lepicoleaceae is a sister group of Vetaformaceae. The molecular phylogeny of hepatics classified the Lepicoleaceae, Vetaformaceae, Mastigophoraceae and Herbertaceae as a monophyletic group.
