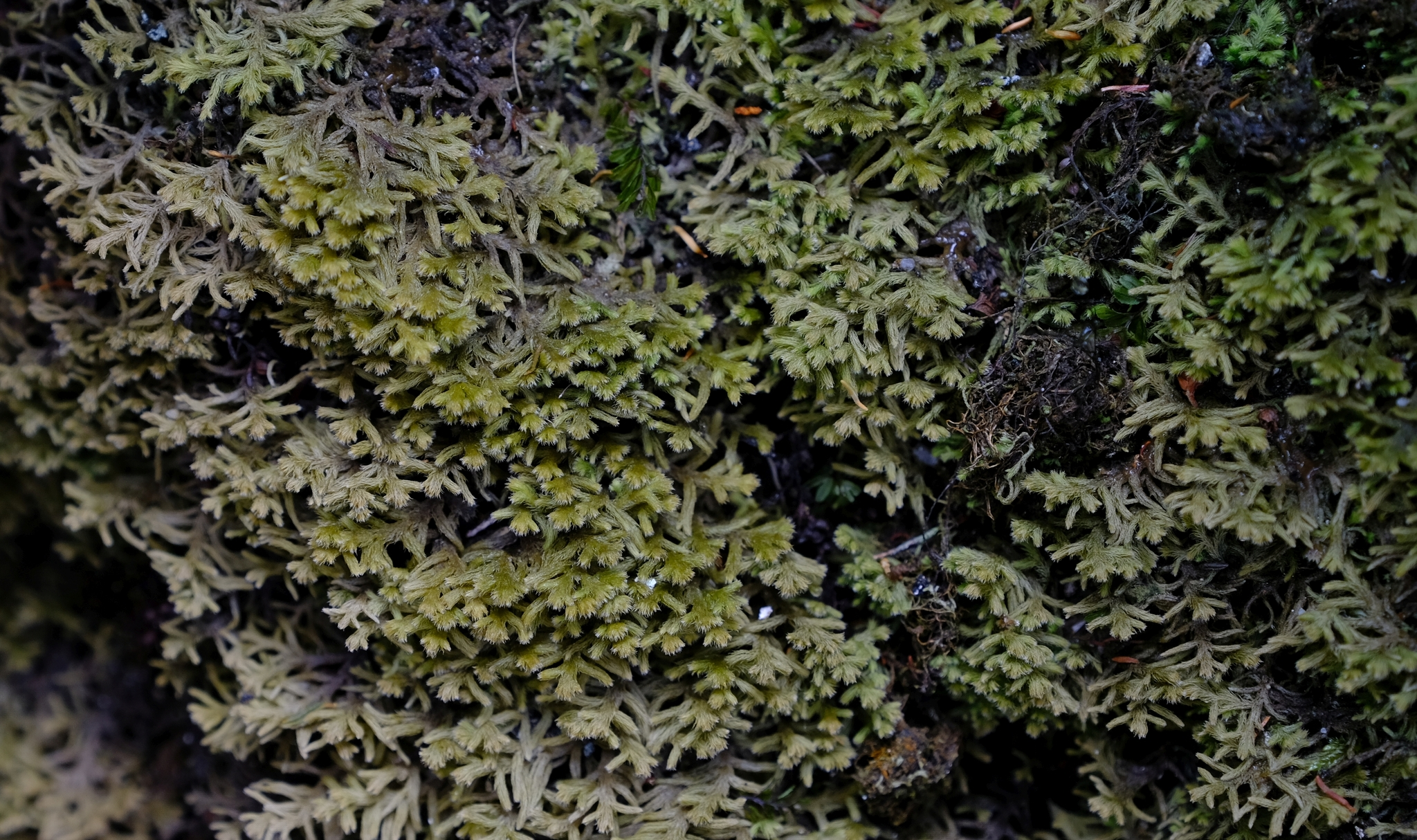
- Lepicolea ochroleuca

Scientific classification
- Kingdom: Plantae
- Division: Marchantiophyta
- Class: Jungermanniopsida
- Order: Lepidoziales
- Family: Lepicoleaceae
- Genus: Lepicolea; Dumort.

Type species
- Lepicolea scolopendra (Hook.) Dumort. ex Trevis.

Synonyms
- Leperoma Mitt.

= Lepicolea =

Genus of liverworts

Lepicolea is a genus of liverworts belonging to the family Lepicoleaceae.

The genus was first described by Barthélemy Charles Joseph Dumortier.

The genus has a cosmopolitan distribution, but mostly in the Southern Hemisphere. Lepicolea ochroleuca is found in Chile and Brazil, Lepicolea prudent is found in Colombia and Lepicolea ramenifissa is found in Venezuela and Bolivia.

Lepicolea ochroleuca also belongs to the Gondwanaland flora with occurrences in South Africa, New Zealand and especially South America, reaching up to Mexico. It was also found to contains a natural compound called Ligan, and also Sesquiterpenoids and diterpenoids.

== Species ==
As accepted by GBIF;

- Lepicolea abnormis Stephani
- Lepicolea algoides Stephani
- Lepicolea attenuata (Mitt.) Steph.
- Lepicolea bidentula (Steph.) R.M.Schust.
- Lepicolea boliviensis Steph.
- Lepicolea fissa Stephani
- Lepicolea flaccida Stephani
- Lepicolea georgica Stephani
- Lepicolea herzogiana Steph.
- Lepicolea longifissa Stephani
- Lepicolea loriana Stephani
- Lepicolea magellanica (Gola) Solari
- Lepicolea norrisii Piippo
- Lepicolea ochroleuca (Spreng.) Spruce
- Lepicolea pruinosa (Taylor) Spruce
- Lepicolea ramenifissa Herzog
- Lepicolea ramentifissa Herzog
- Lepicolea rara (Steph.) Grolle
- Lepicolea rigida (De Not.) E.B.Scott
- Lepicolea scolopendra (Hook.) Dumort. ex Trevis.
- Lepicolea simplicior Herzog
- Lepicolea yakushimensis (S.Hatt.) S.Hatt.
- Lepicolea yakusimensis (S.Hatt.) S.Hatt.
