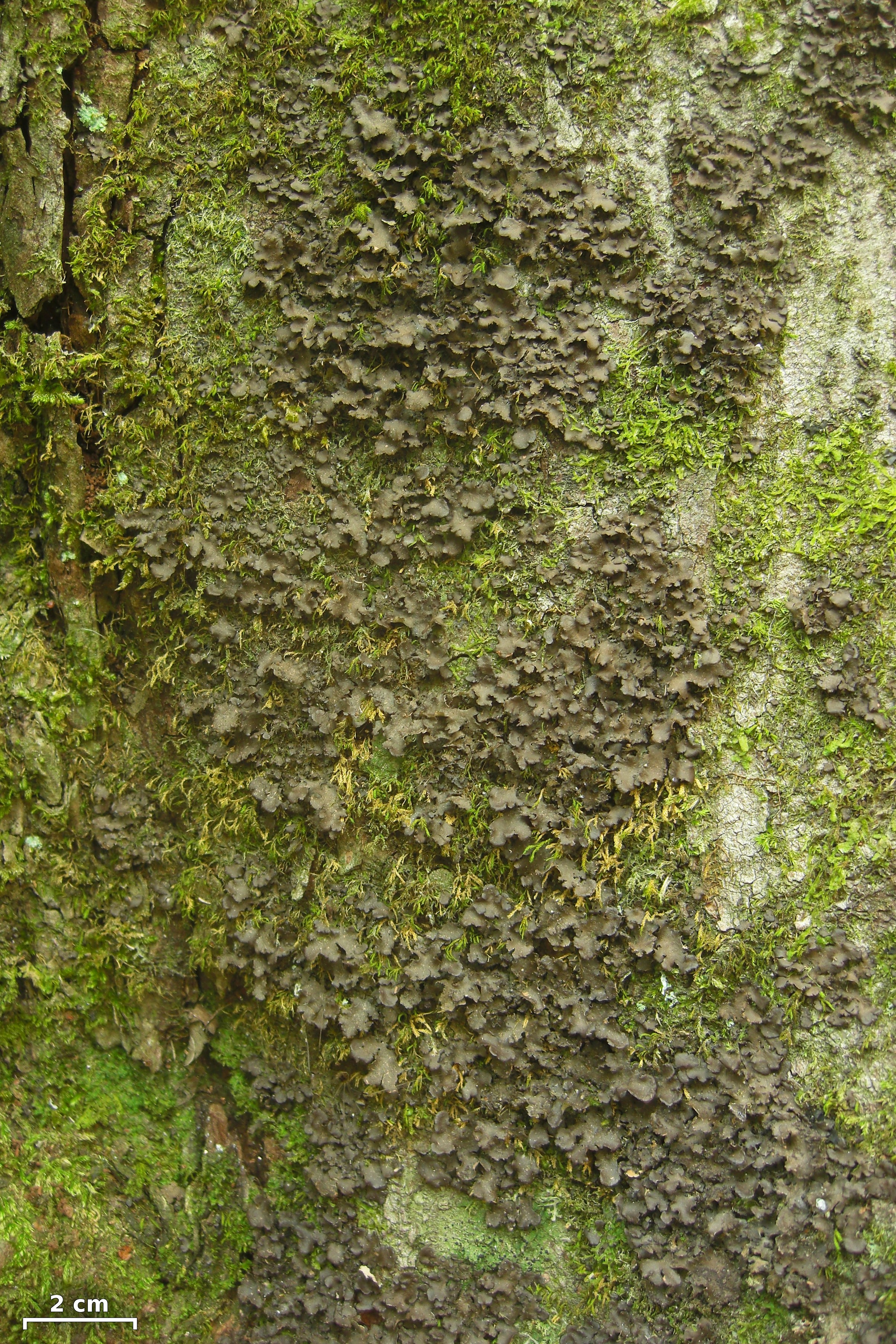
- Sticta carolinensis

Scientific classification
- Kingdom: Fungi
- Division: Ascomycota
- Class: Lecanoromycetes
- Order: Peltigerales
- Family: Peltigeraceae
- Genus: Sticta (Schreb.) Ach. (1803)

Type species
- Sticta sylvatica (Huds.) Ach. (1803)

Synonyms
- Diclasmia Trevis. (1869); Dysticta Clem. (1909); Dystictina Clem. (1909); Lichen sect. Sticta Schreb. (1791)

= Sticta =

Genus of lichens

Sticta is a genus of lichens in the family Peltigeraceae. The genus has a widespread distribution, especially in tropical areas, and includes about 114 species. These lichens have a leafy appearance, and are colored brown or black. Sticta species with cyanobacteria as photobionts can fix nitrogen from the atmosphere, and due to their relative abundance and high turnover, they contribute appreciably to the rainforest ecosystem. They are commonly called spotted felt lichens.

== Description ==
The vegetative bodies of the Sticta, the thalli, are foliose, or leafy in appearance. They typically have dimensions of 2 to 5 centimetres (0.8 to 2.0 in) in diameter, although specimens with diameters of up to 10 centimetres (4 in) have been recorded. The lobes are rounded, and the upper surface is black or brown, while the lower surface has a light to dark brown layer of fine hairs (a tomentum), with a few craters, called cyphellae. Thalli often smell of shrimp or fish. The vegetative reproductive structures called isidia or soredia are often present on species in this genus; apothecia (cup-shaped spore-bearing structures) are rarely found. Sticta species are usually found growing on bark, wood, or mossy rock.

Photobiont partners of Sticta species include members of the green algae genera Chloroidium, Coccomyxa, Elliptochloris, Heveochlorella, and Symbiochloris.

The liverwort genus Monoclea contains lichen-like organisms completely unrelated to, but readily confused with Sticta.

== Distribution and habitat ==
Sticta species are primarily tropical in distribution, but some species have been reported from as north as Norway, and as far south as the southern tip of South America.

Most species of Sticta grow on bark, wood, or mossy rock, usually in humid areas.

== Phylogenetics ==
Phylogenetic analysis of small and large ribosomal RNA subunits has confirmed that the genus Sticta is monophyletic.

== Indicators of ecological continuity ==
Some epiphytic lichen species may be used as "ancient woodland indicators"; they can used to quantitatively assess the degree to which a forest has had a long history of canopy continuity. The presence of these species is a reliable indicator that the forest has existed back to early medieval times, without being clear-cut and regrown. Two Sticta species, namely, S. dufournii or the blue-green algal morphotype S. canariensis, are among several species of lichens that may be used to calculate the New Index of Ecological Continuity (NIEC), considered the most sensitive and accurate determination of forest continuity.

== Bioactive compounds ==
A comprehensive comparative study on the antioxidant activity of lichens from Hawaii and Iceland revealed the Hawaiian lichen S. weigelii to be a potent producer of antioxidative compounds.

== Species ==
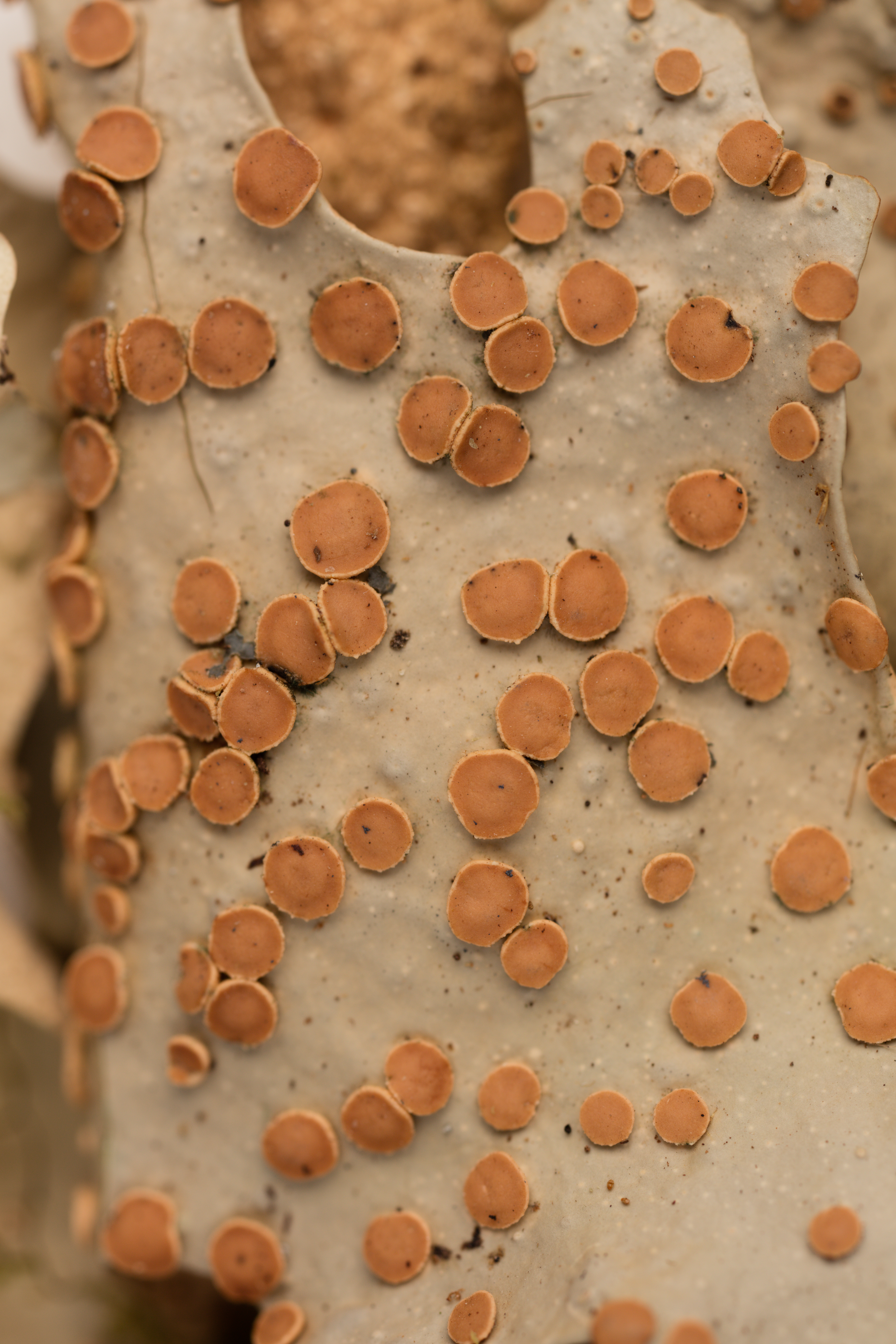
Sticta caperata

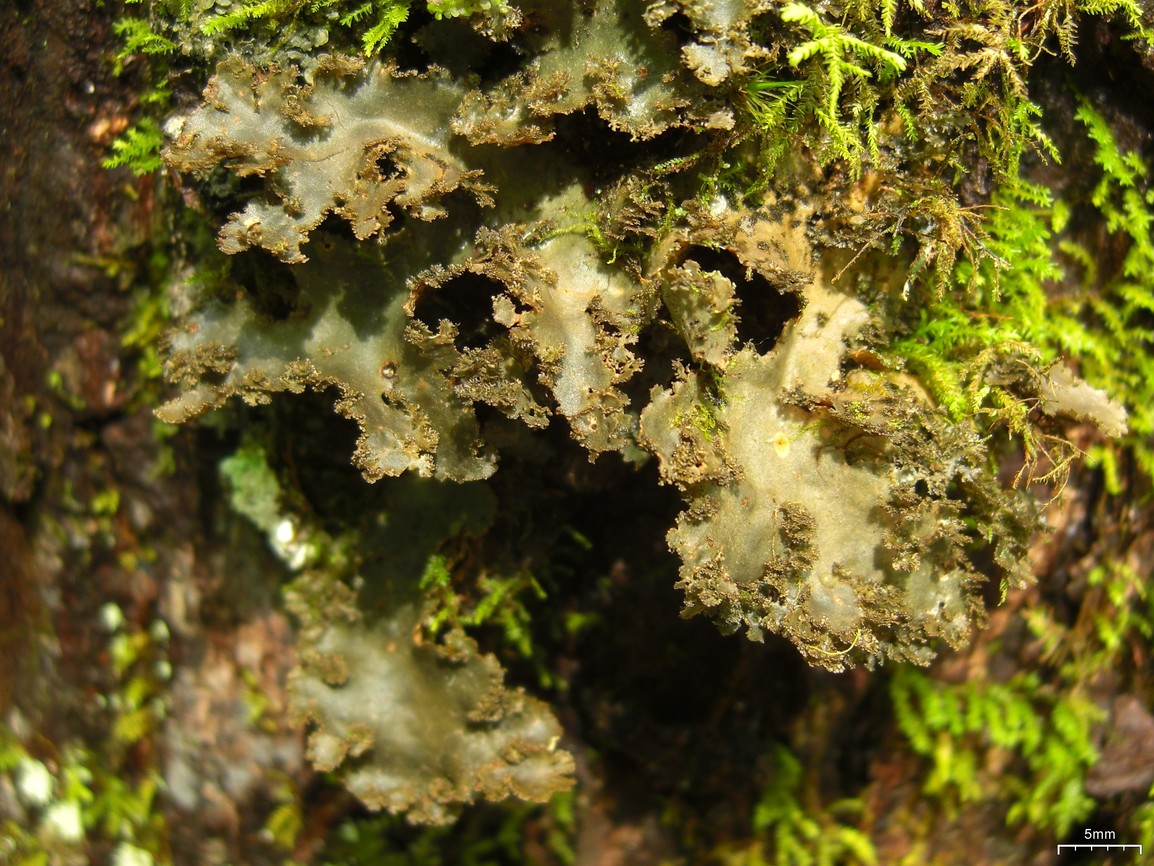
Sticta fragilinata in the Great Smoky Mountains, North Carolina

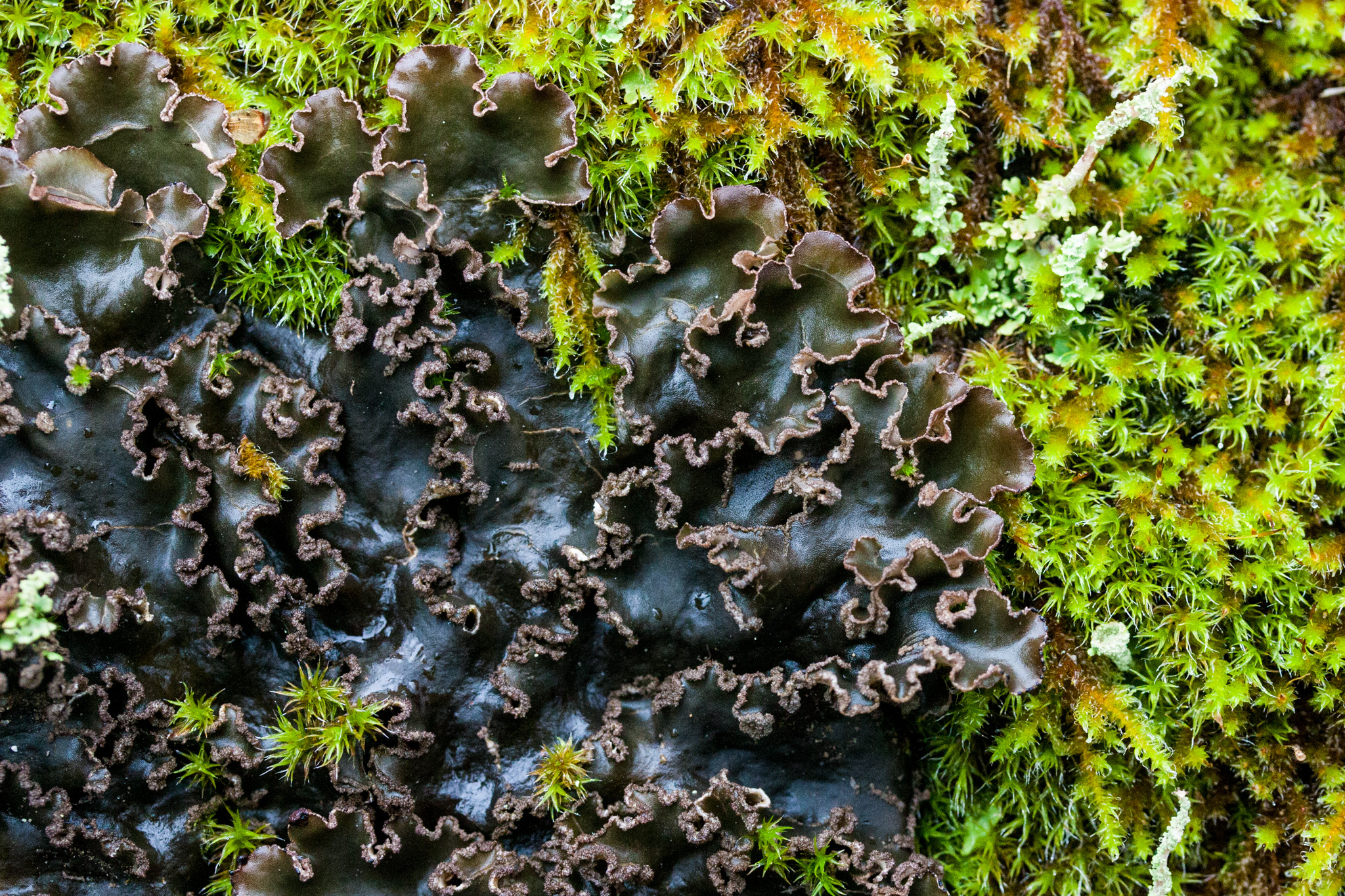
Sticta limbata

- Sticta acyphellata Moncada & Lücking (2020) – Hawaii
- Sticta alpinotropica Aptroot (2008) – Papua New Guinea
- Sticta andina B.Moncada, Lücking & Sérus. (2021) – Colombia
- Sticta antoniana Moncada & Lücking (2020) – Hawaii
- Sticta aongstroemii Dal Forno, Moncada & Lücking (2018) – Brazil
- Sticta arachnofuliginosa Moncada & Lücking (2012) – Colombia
- Sticta arbuscula Moncada & Lücking (2012) – Colombia
- Sticta arbusculotomentosa Moncada & Betanc. (2015)
- Sticta arenosella Di Meglio & Goward (2023)
- Sticta atlantica Magain & Sérus. (2015) – Europe
- Sticta atroandensis Moncada & Lücking (2013) – Colombia
- Sticta baileyi D.J.Galloway (1998) – Australia
- Sticta borinquensis Merc.-Díaz & Lücking (2020) – Puerto Rico
- Sticta brevior Moncada & Lücking (2013) – Colombia
- Sticta brevipes (Müll.Arg.) Zahlbr. (1925)
- Sticta caliginosa D.J.Galloway (1983)
- Sticta camarae Müll.Arg. (1882)
- Sticta canariensis (Bory) Bory ex Delise (1822)
- Sticta caperata (Nyl.) Nyl. (1863)
- Sticta carolinensis T.McDonald (2003)
- Sticta ciliata Taylor (1836) – Neotropics; Africa; Macaronesia; Western Europe
- Sticta corymbosa Merc.-Díaz & Lücking (2020) – Puerto Rico
- Sticta cyphellulata (Müll.Arg.) Hue (1901)
- Sticta dendroides (Nyl.) Moncada, Lücking & de Lange (2018)
- Sticta densiphyllidiata Merc.-Díaz & Lücking (2020) – Puerto Rico
- Sticta deyana Lendemer & Goffinet (2015) – North America
- Sticta diversa (Stirt.) Zahlbr. (1925)
- Sticta duplolimbata (Hue) Vain. (1913)
- Sticta emmanueliana Moncada, Lücking & Lumbsch (2020) – Hawaii
- Sticta fasciculata Di Meglio & Goward (2023)
- Sticta filix (Sw.) Nyl. (1867)
- Sticta flavireagens (Gyeln.) Diederich & Ertz (2020)
- Sticta flavocyphellata D.J.Galloway (1998) – Australia
- Sticta flynnii Moncada & Lücking (2020) – Hawaii
- Sticta fragilinata T.McDonald (2003)
- Sticta fuliginoides Magain & Sérus. (2015) – Continental Europe; Canary Islands; eastern North America; Colombia
- Sticta fuliginosa (Dicks.) Ach. (1803) – widespread
- Sticta fuscotomentosa Moncada, Coca & Lücking (2015)
- Sticta gallowayana Moncada & Lucking (2015)
- Sticta globulifuliginosa Moncada, A.Suárez & Lücking (2015)
- Sticta gretae Di Meglio & Goward (2023)
- Sticta guilartensis Merc.-Díaz & Lücking (2020) – Puerto Rico
- Sticta harrisii Merc.-Díaz & Lücking (2020) – Puerto Rico
- Sticta hawaiiensis Moncada & Lücking (2020) – Hawaii
- Sticta henrici B.Moncada, D.Rincón & Lücking (2023) – Colombia
- Sticta hirsutifuliginosa Moncada, A.Suárez & Lücking (2015)
- Sticta howei D.J.Galloway (1998) – Australia
- Sticta humboldtii Hook. (1822)
- Sticta hypopsiloides Nyl. (1861)
- Sticta indica D.D.Awasthi & Upreti (2010) – India
- Sticta isidiokunthii Moncada & Lücking (2012) – Colombia
- Sticta jaguirreana Moncada, A.Suárez & Lücking (2015)
- Sticta laciniosa D.J.Galloway (1994)
- Sticta latifrons A.Rich. (1832)
- Sticta leucoblephara (Müll.Arg.) D.J.Galloway (2004)
- Sticta limbata (Sm.) Ach. (1803)
- Sticta lobarioides Moncada & Coca (2013)
- Sticta lumbschiana Moncada & Lücking (2013) – Colombia
- Sticta macrocyphellata Moncada & Coca (2013) – Colombia
- Sticta macrofuliginosa Moncada & Lücking (2015)
- Sticta macrothallina Moncada & Coca (2013)
- Sticta maculofuliginosa Moncada & Lücking (2012) – Colombia
- Sticta marginifera Mont. (1842)
- Sticta martinii D.J.Galloway (1983) – New Zealand
- Sticta mexicana D.J.Galloway (2004)
- Sticta microcyphellata Moncada & Lücking (2012) – Colombia
- Sticta minutula Moncada, A.Suárez & Lücking (2015)
- Sticta myrioloba (Müll.Arg.) D.J.Galloway (1998) – Australia
- Sticta nashii D.J.Galloway (2004)
- Sticta neopulmonarioides Moncada & Coca (2013)
- Sticta papillata Moncada & Lücking (2012) – Colombia
- Sticta parahumboldtii Moncada & Lücking (2013) – Colombia
- Sticta parvilobata Merc.-Díaz & Lücking (2020) – Puerto Rico
- Sticta pedunculata Kremp. (1874)
- Sticta phyllidiifuliginosa Moncada, A.Suárez & Lücking (2015)
- Sticta phyllidiokunthii Moncada & Lücking (2013)
- Sticta plumbeociliata Moncada, A.Suárez & Lücking (2015)
- Sticta pseudohumboldtii Moncada & Lücking (2013) – Colombia
- Sticta pseudolobaria Moncada & Coca (2013)
- Sticta pulmonarioides Moncada & Coca (2013)
- Sticta riparia Merc.-Díaz & Lücking (2020) – Puerto Rico
- Sticta rhizinata Moncada & Lücking (2012) – Colombia
- Sticta rubropruinosa Moncada & Lücking (2012) – Colombia
- Sticta rutilans (Stirt.) Zahlbr. (1925)
- Sticta sayeri Müll.Arg. (1888)
- Sticta silverstonei Moncada & Lücking (2012) – Colombia
- Sticta sinuosa Pers. (1827)
- Sticta smithii Moncada & Lücking (2020) – Hawaii
- Sticta stipitata C.Knight (1891)
- Sticta subfilicinella Moncada, Coca & Lücking (2015)
- Sticta sublimbata (J.Steiner) Swinscow & Krog (1983)
- Sticta subtomentella (C.Knight ex Shirley) Zahlbr. (1925)
- Sticta swartzii D.J.Galloway (1994)
- Sticta sylvatica (Huds.) Ach. (1803) – continental Europe; Andes (Colombia)
- Sticta tainorum Merc.-Díaz & Lücking (2020) – Puerto Rico
- Sticta tatamana Moncada & Coca (2013)
- Sticta tesselata Øvstedal (2010)
- Sticta torii Ant.Simon & Goward (2018)
- Sticta tunjensis Moncada & Lücking (2012) – Colombia
- Sticta variabilis Ach. (1810)
- Sticta venosa Lücking, Moncada & Robayo (2011)
- Sticta viviana Alej.Suárez & Lücking (2013) – Colombia
- Sticta waikamoi Moncada & Lücking (2020) – Hawaii
- Sticta xanthotropa (Kremp.) D.J.Galloway (2004)
