= Yoshimuriella =

Scientific classification
- Domain: Eukaryota
- Kingdom: Fungi
- Division: Ascomycota
- Class: Lecanoromycetes
- Order: Peltigerales
- Family: Peltigeraceae
- Genus: Yoshimuriella; B.Moncada & Lücking (2013)

Type species
- Yoshimuriella fendleri (Tuck. & Mont.) Moncada & Lücking (2013)

Species
- See text

Genus of lichens

Yoshimuriella is a genus of foliose (leafy) lichens in the family Peltigeraceae. It has nine species.

== Taxonomy ==
The genus was circumscribed by lichenologists Bibiana Moncada and Robert Lücking in 2013, with Yoshimuriella fendleri assigned as the type species. The genus contains species that were previously considered part of the Lobaria peltigera species group, a clade of predominantly neotropical lichens. The transfer of these species from Lobaria to Yoshimuriella represented a significant taxonomic revision in the understanding of this group. This revision built upon earlier studies by Edvard August Vainio (1890) and Isao Yoshimura (1998), who helped establish the fundamental distinctions between species in this group. The genus name honours the Japanese botanist and lichenologist Yoshimura for his contributions to the understanding of the genus Lobaria and allied species. Seven species were included in the original circumscription of the genus.

== Description ==
Yoshimuriella consists of foliose lichens that typically grows as epiphytes, and less frequently on logs or mossy rocks. They are green when wet, drying out to a pale greyish colour, and becoming pale yellowish after lengthy storage in a herbarium. The thalli can display various surface textures including pitted (foveolate) or even surfaces, with lobes that may be plane or shallowly canaliculate The underside features distinctive vein patterns that vary between species, from regular single veins to more complex patterns with secondary branching. Pseudocyphellae (pores for air exchange) and soredia are absent; isidia or phyllidia and lobules are often present, and are usually found at the margins of the lobes. The apothecia are cup-shaped and lecanorine in form. The photobiont partner is the green algal genus Dictyochloropsis. Secondary compounds that occur in Yoshimuriella include pseudocyphellarin A, gyrophoric acid, and congyrophoric acid.

== Species ==
As of August 2022, Species Fungorum (in the Catalogue of Life) accepts eight species of Yoshimuriella; this total does not yet include a ninth species that was added to the genus in 2021. They are shown in this list, followed by their author citation, year of transfer into Yoshimuriella, and location where the type specimen was collected.

- Yoshimuriella carassensis (Vain.) B.Moncada & Lücking (2013) – Brazil
- Yoshimuriella corrosa (Ach.) B.Moncada & Lücking (2013) – Peru
- Yoshimuriella denudata (Taylor) B.Moncada & Lücking (2021) – Colombia
- Yoshimuriella deplanata (Nyl.) B.Moncada & Lücking (2013) – Colombia
- Yoshimuriella dissecta (Sw.) B.Moncada & Lücking (2013) – Jamaica
- Yoshimuriella enfogoa B.Moncada & Lücking (2023) – Colombia
- Yoshimuriella fendleri (Tuck. & Mont.) B.Moncada & Lücking (2013) – Venezuela
- Yoshimuriella peltigera (Vain.) Lücking & B.Moncada (2018) – Brazil
- Yoshimuriella subcorrosa (Nyl.) B.Moncada & Lücking (2013) – Mexico
- Yoshimuriella subdissecta (Nyl.) B.Moncada & Lücking (2013) – Bolivia
