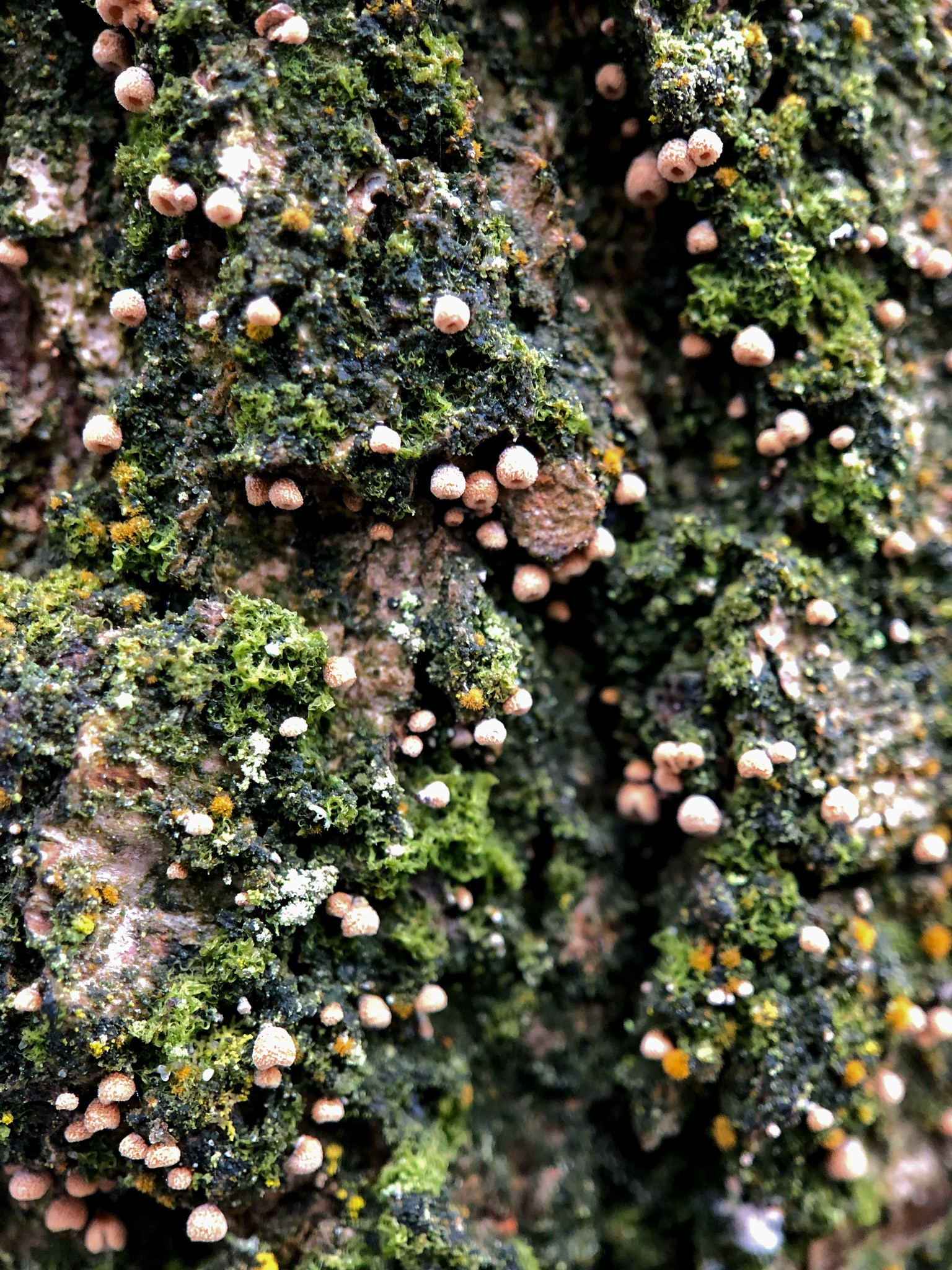
- Cyphella ferruginea

Scientific classification
- Kingdom: Fungi
- Division: Basidiomycota
- Class: Agaricomycetes
- Order: Agaricales
- Family: Cyphellaceae
- Genus: Cyphella; Fr. (1822)

Type species
- Cyphella digitalis (Alb. & Schwein.) Fr. (1822)

= Cyphella =

Genus of fungi

Cyphella is a genus of fungi in the family Cyphellaceae. A 2008 estimate placed about 300 species in the widely distributed genus.

== Selected species ==
- Cyphella digitalis
