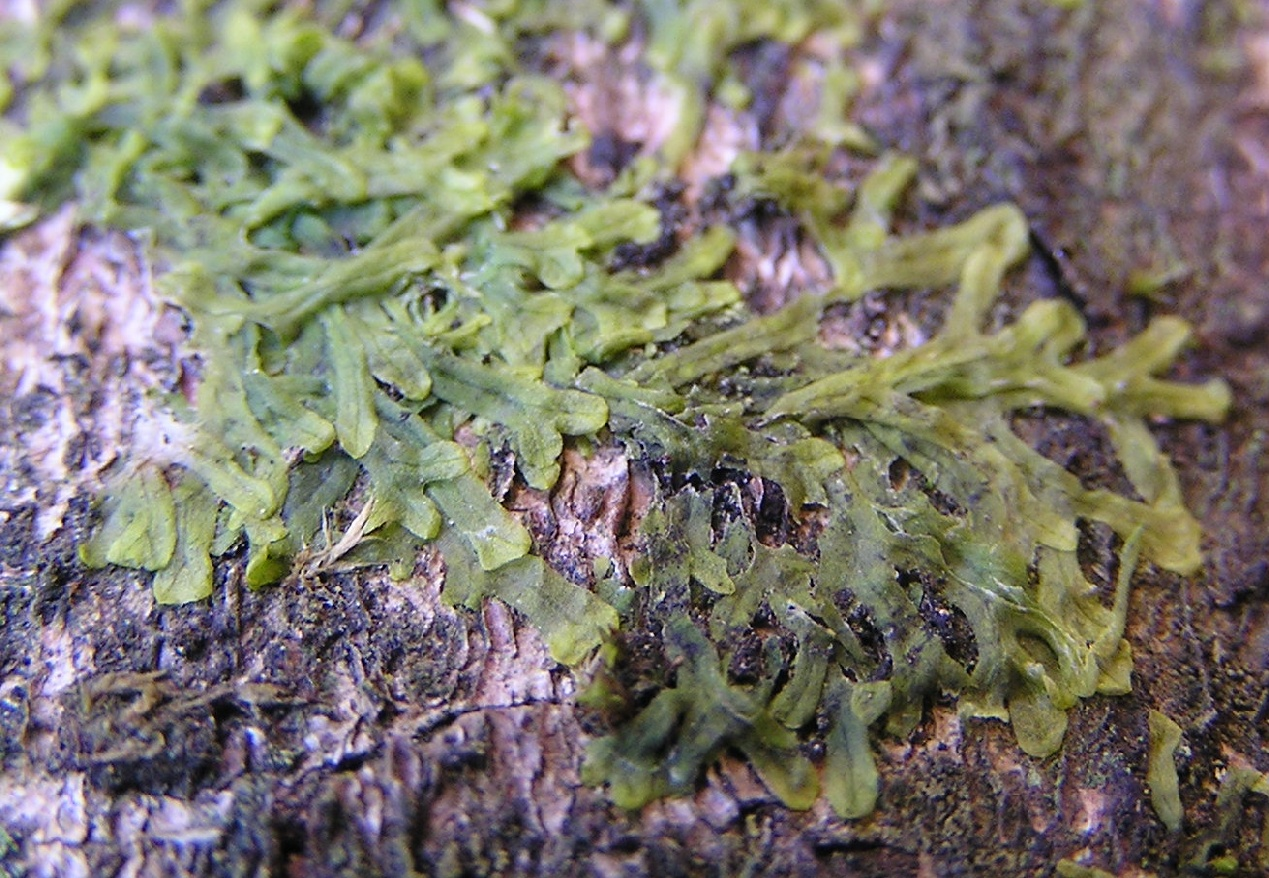
- Metzgeria furcata growing on bark in Germany

Scientific classification
- Kingdom: Plantae
- Division: Marchantiophyta
- Class: Jungermanniopsida
- Order: Metzgeriales
- Family: Metzgeriaceae
- Genus: Metzgeria; Raddi, 1818

Synonyms
- List: Apertithallus Kuwah.; Apometzgeria Kuwah.; Austrometzgeria Kuwah.; Echinomitrion Corda; Echinogyna Dumort.; Fasciola Dumort.; Herverus Gray

= Metzgeria =

Genus of liverworts

Metzgeria is a genus of thalloid liverworts in the family Metzgeriaceae.

== Taxonomy ==
The genus was named in honor of Johann Metzger (1771–1844), a German copper engraver and art restorer from Staufen im Breisgau, in Baden-Württemberg, a friend of Giuseppe Raddi and pupil of the great Florentine engraver Raffaello Sanzio Morghen (1753–1833).

=== Species ===
Species may be either monoicous or dioicous. Approximately 120 to 200 species of Metzgeria have been described and the following species are currently recognised:

- Metzgeria acuminata Steph.
- Metzgeria adscendens Steph. ex K.I. Goebel
- Metzgeria agnewii Kuwah.
- Metzgeria albinea Spruce
- Metzgeria allionii Steph.
- Metzgeria alpina J.J. Engel & R.M. Schust.
- Metzgeria americana Masuzaki
- Metzgeria attenuata Steph.
- Metzgeria aurantiaca Steph.
- Metzgeria auriculata Grolle & Kuwah.
- Metzgeria bahiensis Schiffn.
- Metzgeria bartlettii Kuwah.
- Metzgeria bischlerae Kuwah.
- Metzgeria bracteata Spruce
- Metzgeria brasiliensis Schiffn.
- Metzgeria chilensis Steph.
- Metzgeria ciliata Raddi
- Metzgeria clavaeflora Spruce
- Metzgeria cleefii Kuwah.
- Metzgeria comata Steph.
- Metzgeria conjugata Lindb.
- Metzgeria consanguinea Schiffn.
- Metzgeria convoluta Steph.
- Metzgeria coorgense S.C. Srivast. & S. Srivast.
- Metzgeria corralensis Steph.
- Metzgeria crassipilis (Lindb.) A. Evans
- Metzgeria cratoneura Schiffn.
- Metzgeria decrescens Steph.
- Metzgeria deniseana Gradst. & Ilk.-Borg.
- Metzgeria dichotoma (Sw.) Nees
- Metzgeria divaricata A. Evans
- Metzgeria dorsipara (Herzog) Kuwah.
- Metzgeria duricosta Steph.
- Metzgeria engelii Kuwah.
- Metzgeria epiphylla A. Evans
- Metzgeria filicina Mitt.
- Metzgeria flavovirens Colenso
- Metzgeria foliicola Schiffn.
- Metzgeria francana Steph.
- Metzgeria frontipilis Lindb.
- Metzgeria fruticola Spruce
- Metzgeria fukuokana Kuwah.
- Metzgeria furcata (L.) Corda
- Metzgeria grandiflora A. Evans
- Metzgeria hasselii Kuwah.
- Metzgeria hebridensis Steph.
- Metzgeria hegewaldii Kuwah.
- Metzgeria herminieri Schiffn.
- Metzgeria heteroramea Steph.
- Metzgeria holzii Gradst. & A.R. Benitez
- Metzgeria imberbis J.B. Jack & Steph.
- Metzgeria inflata Steph.
- Metzgeria jamesonii Kuwah.
- Metzgeria kanaii Kuwah.
- Metzgeria kinabaluensis Masuzaki
- Metzgeria kuwaharae Piippo
- Metzgeria laciniata Kuwah.
- Metzgeria lechleri Steph.
- Metzgeria leptoneura Spruce
- Metzgeria liebmanniana Lindenb. & Gottsche
- Metzgeria lindbergii Schiffn.
- Metzgeria litoralis J.J. Engel & Kuwah.
- Metzgeria longitexta Steph.
- Metzgeria macrospora Kuwah.
- Metzgeria macveanii Kuwah.
- Metzgeria maegdefraui Kuwah.
- Metzgeria magellanica Schiffn.
- Metzgeria mexicana Steph.
- Metzgeria mizoramensis Sushil K. Singh & D. Singh
- Metzgeria monoica Kuwah. & J.J. Engel
- Metzgeria myriopoda Lindb.
- Metzgeria neotropica Kuwah.
- Metzgeria nudifrons Steph.
- Metzgeria parviinvolucrata Kuwah.
- Metzgeria patagonica Steph.
- Metzgeria polytricha Spruce
- Metzgeria procera Mitt.
- Metzgeria psilocraspeda Schiffn.
- Metzgeria pubescens (Schrank) Raddi
- Metzgeria pulvinata Steph.
- Metzgeria quadrifaria Steph.
- Metzgeria raoi S.C. Srivast. & S. Srivast.
- Metzgeria rigida Lindb.
- Metzgeria robinsonii Steph.
- Metzgeria roivainenii Kuwah.
- Metzgeria rufula Spruce
- Metzgeria saccata Mitt.
- Metzgeria scobina Mitt.
- Metzgeria scyphigera A. Evans
- Metzgeria senjoana Masuzaki
- Metzgeria setigera R.M. Schust. ex Crand.-Stotl. & L. Söderstr.
- Metzgeria sikkimensis S.C. Srivast. & K.K. Rawat
- Metzgeria simplex Lorb. ex Müll. Frib.
- Metzgeria sinuata Loitl.
- Metzgeria sparrei Kuwah.
- Metzgeria spindleri Steph.
- Metzgeria subaneura Schiffn.
- Metzgeria submarginata M.L. So
- Metzgeria subundulata (Austin ex Lindb.) Kuwah.
- Metzgeria uncigera A. Evans
- Metzgeria undulata Kuwah.
- Metzgeria violacea (Ach.) Dumort.
- Metzgeria warnstorffii Steph.

== Literature ==
- RADDI G. 1818. Jungermanniografia Etrusca. Memorie i Mathematica e di Fisica della Societa Italiana delle Scienze (Modena), 18: 14–56, plus tables.
- Meagher, David (University of Melbourne Department of Botany), pers. comm.
