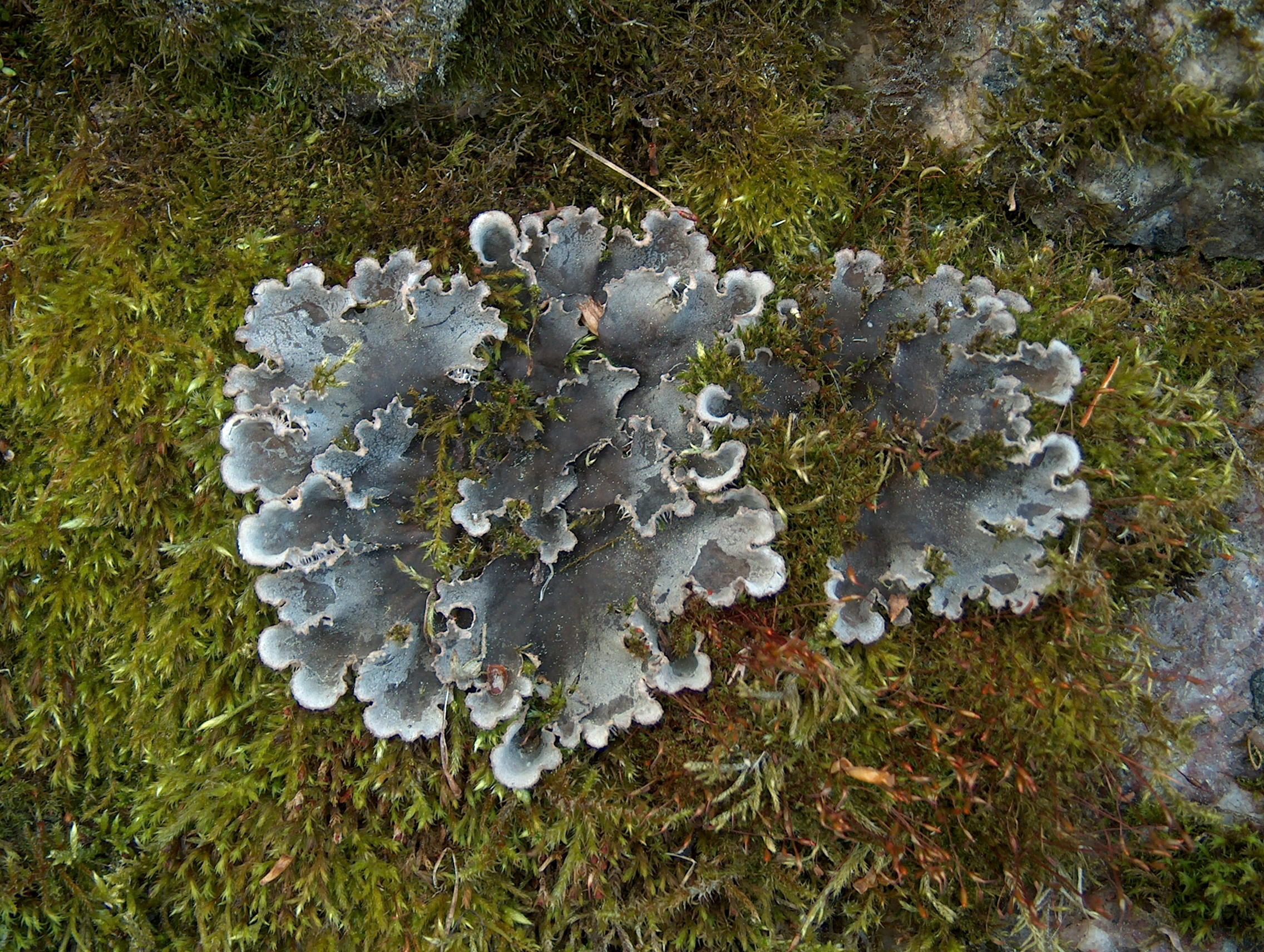
- Peltigera canina is the type species of genus Peltigera.

Scientific classification
- Kingdom: Fungi
- Division: Ascomycota
- Class: Lecanoromycetes
- Order: Peltigerales
- Family: Peltigeraceae; Dumort. (1822)

Type genus
- Peltigera Willd. (1787)

Subfamilies
- Lobarioideae; Nephromatoideae; Peltigeroideae

Synonyms
- Lobariaceae Chevall. (1826); Nephromataceae Wetmore ex J.C.David & D.Hawksw. (1990)

= Peltigeraceae =

Family of lichenized fungi

The Peltigeraceae are a family of lichens in the order Peltigerales. The Peltigeraceae, which contains 15 genera and about 600 species, has recently (2018) been emended to include the families Lobariaceae and Nephromataceae. Many Peltigeraceae species have large and conspicuous, leathery thalli. They largely occur in cool-temperate to tropical montane climates. Tripartite thalli involving fungus, green algae and cyanobacteria are common in this family.

== Taxonomy ==
The family Peltigeraceae was circumscribed by Belgian botanist Barthélemy Charles Joseph Dumortier in 1822. Using a temporal approach that uses time-calibrated chronograms to identify and define temporal bands for comparable ordinal and family ranks in the Lecanoromycetes, the families Lobariaceae and Nephromataceae were synonymized with Peltigeraceae in 2018. In a later critical review of the use of this method for the biological classification of lichens, Robert Lücking considered this merge justified based on several characteristics shared by all three groups. These include "the leathery structure of their usually large and conspicuous thalli, apothecial morphology and anatomy, ascus and ascospore type, and the fact that tripartite thalli or photosymbiodemes involving green algae and cyanobacteria are common". The proposed synonymy was also accepted in a 2020 review of fungal classification.

Since the two synonymized families have been widely used, and have been accepted previously as phylogenetically distinct clades within older families, Lumbsch and Leavitt proposed the following subfamilies of Peltigeraceae, which "allows recognition of these well-established and monophyletic clades while avoiding confusion due to incomparable ranks of clades."

Lobarioideae Lumbsch & S.D.Leav. (2019)
Nephromatoideae Lumbsch & S.D.Leav. (2019)

According to Lumbsch and Leavitt, Peltigeroideae becomes an available name that could be used to include the Peltigeraceae sensu stricto.

== Genera ==
A 2020 estimate placed 15 genera and about 600 species in the Peltigeraceae, but two new monotypic genera have since been added to the family.

- Lobarioideae

- Crocodia Link (1833) – 5 spp.
- Dendriscosticta Moncada & Lücking (2013) – 5 spp.
- Emmanuelia Ant.Simon, Lücking & Goffinet (2020) – 12 spp.
- Lobaria (Schreb.) Hoffm. (1796) – ca. 60 spp.
- Lobariella Yoshim. (2002) – 35 spp.
- Lobarina Nyl. ex Cromb. (1894) – 15 spp.
- Podostictina Clem. (1909) – 5 spp.
- Pseudocyphellaria Vain. (1890) – ca. 100 spp.
- Ricasolia De Not. (1846) – 15 spp.
- Sticta (Schreb.) Ach. (1803) – ca. 200 spp.
- Yarrumia D.J.Galloway (2015) – 2 spp.
- Yoshimuriella Moncada & Lücking (2013) – 8 spp.

- Nephromatoideae

- Nephroma Ach. (1809) – ca. 36 spp.

- Peltigeroideae

- Peltigera Willd. (1787) – ca. 100 spp.
- Sinuicella D.F.Stone, McCune & Miądl. (2021) – 1 sp.
- Solorina Ach. (1808) – ca. 10 spp.

== Uses ==
Many species of Peltigeraceae have been used in studies on environmental pollution and have been utilized as indicator species for pollution, woodland management, and ecological continuity.

== Conservation ==
As of March 2022, Peltigeraceae species that have been assessed for the global IUCN Red List are all from the genus Sticta: S. deyana (critically endangered, 2020); S. carolinensis (vulnerable, 2020); S. alpinotropica (endangered, 2017); and S. fragilinata (endangered, 2020).
