= Lichenopeltella rangiferinae =

Scientific classification
- Kingdom: Fungi
- Division: Ascomycota
- Class: Dothideomycetes
- Order: Microthyriales
- Family: Microthyriaceae
- Genus: Lichenopeltella
- Species: L. rangiferinae

Binomial name
- Lichenopeltella rangiferinae Brackel (2011)
- Holotype: Hrútey, Iceland

Species of fungus

Lichenopeltella rangiferinae is a species of lichenicolous (lichen-dwelling) fungus in the family Microthyriaceae. Described as a new species in 2011, it is found in Iceland, where it grows on the podetia (upright stalks) of Cladonia lichens.

== Taxonomy ==
Lichenopeltella rangiferinae was discovered growing on Cladonia rangiferina in Hrútey near Blönduós, an island in the river Blanda near Blönduós in Austur-Húnavatnssýsla, North Iceland. The fungus was found growing on Cladonia rangiferina in a heath habitat, at an elevation of about 30 metres. The holotype is preserved in the herbarium of the Botanische Staatssammlung München (M) in Germany.

It belongs to the genus Lichenopeltella, which contains numerous species that grow parasitically on different lichen hosts. It is one of only two known Lichenopeltella species with divergent setae, the other being L. peltigericola. While similar to L. peltigericola in having divergent setae, four-spored asci, and three pairs of setulae, L. rangiferinae can be distinguished by its larger ascomata, smaller ascospores, predominantly 3-septate (rather than consistently 1-septate) spores, and its association with a different host genus. It differs from the other Lichenopeltella species known to grow on Cladonia (L. cladoniarum) by the presence of setae and setulae, which L. cladoniarum lacks entirely.

== Description ==
Lichenopeltella rangiferinae forms small, dark brown to black, disc-shaped reproductive structures (ascomata) that measure 80–120 μm in diameter and 25–45 μm in height. These ascomata have a distinctive appearance: they are slightly convex, rounded when viewed from above, and feature a small triangular opening (ostiole) approximately 9 μm wide. This opening is surrounded by a dark brown collar formed from thick-walled cells.

A distinctive characteristic of L. rangiferinae is the crown of divergent setae (hair-like structures) around the ostiole. These setae measure 25–40 μm in length and 3–4(–5) μm in width, are dark brown, thick-walled, smooth, pointed, and non-septate (without cross-walls). The setae radiate outward, giving the fungus a star-like appearance when viewed from above.

The reproductive cells (asci) are ovoid to obclavate (inversely club-shaped), measure (17–)19–25(–29) by 8–9 μm, and typically contain four spores, though occasionally eight spores are present. The spores (ascospores) are ellipsoid, transparent (hyaline), and measure (13–)13.9–15.5(–16) by (3–)3.3–4 μm. They are predominantly 3-septate (divided by three cross-walls), though occasionally only 1-septate, and show slight constriction at these septa. A unique feature is the presence of three pairs of setulae (fine bristles) attached to the larger of the two inner cells of each spore, with each setula measuring 7–8 μm in length.

Lichenopeltella rangiferinae can be found growing both on the basal parts and on the upper parts of its host lichen's podetia (the upright stalks of the Cladonia lichen).
