= Weddellomyces =

Scientific classification
- Domain: Eukaryota
- Kingdom: Fungi
- Division: Ascomycota
- Class: Dothideomycetes
- Order: Pleosporales
- Family: Dacampiaceae
- Genus: Weddellomyces; D.Hawksw. (1986)

Type species
- Weddellomyces epicallopisma (Wedd.) D.Hawksw. (1986)

Synonyms
- Xenosphaeria Trevis. (1860)

Genus of fungi

Weddellomyces is a genus of lichenicolous (lichen-dwelling) fungi in the family Dacampiaceae. It comprises 12 species.

== Taxonomy ==
The genus was circumscribed by David L. Hawskworth in 1986, with Weddellomyces epicallopisma assigned as the type, and at the time, only species. Since its initial description, the genus has expanded to include 12 recognised species.

The genus name Weddellomyces honours Dr. Hugh Algernon Weddell (1819–1877), a notable 19th-century physician and botanist. Weddell made significant contributions to French lichenology and was the original collector of the type species for this genus. Weddell had originally classified the species in Verrucaria in 1873.

Weddellomyces shows some similarities to other fungal genera such as Zopfiofoveola, Dacampia, and Pyrenidium, but is distinguished by its unique combination of morphological features. These include its distinctive ascomata structure, ascus shape, and ascospore characteristics.

== Description ==
Weddellomyces is a genus of lichenicolous fungi, meaning its species grow on lichens. The genus is characterised by several distinctive features. The fruiting bodies, or ascomata, are nearly spherical and black in colour. They have a unique structure with the upper part being cephalothecoid, composed of plates that can split apart, while the lower part consists of irregularly arranged cells. This structure allows the ascomata to open in an irregular manner. Within the ascomata, Weddellomyces species possess a hamathecium, which refers to the sterile tissues between the spore-producing structures. In this genus, the hamathecium is composed of pseudoparaphyses, thread-like structures that grow between the asci. The asci themselves are elongated, either slightly cylindrical or club-shaped, and feature a double wall, a characteristic known as bitunicate. Each ascus typically contains eight spores.

The ascospores of Weddellomyces are ellipsoid in shape and golden brown in colour. They usually have three septa (cross-walls) dividing them into compartments, though some may have only one septum. The surface of these spores is slightly warty (verruculose).

== Species ==
As of October 2024, Species Fungorum (in the Catalogue of Life) accept 12 species of Weddellomyces.

- Weddellomyces aspiciliicola Alstrup (1992) – host: Lobothallia
- Weddellomyces epicallopisma (Wedd.) D.Hawksw. (1986) – host: Protoblastenia, Pyrenodesmia and Variospora
- Weddellomyces erythrocarpae Nav.-Ros. & Cl.Roux (1995) – host: Kuettlingeria erythrocarpa
- Weddellomyces gasparriniae (C.W.Dodge) D.Hawksw. & Iturr. (2006) – host: Caloplaca
- Weddellomyces heterochrous Nav.-Ros. & Cl.Roux (1995) – host: Aspicilia
- Weddellomyces macrosporus D.Hawksw., Renob. & Coppins (1990) – host: Circinaria calcarea and Lobothallia radiosa
- Weddellomyces pachyosporicola Nav.-Ros. & Cl.Roux (1995) – host: Aspicilia
- Weddellomyces periphericus (Taylor) Alstrup & D.Hawksw. (1990) – host: Pertusaria pseudocorallina
- Weddellomyces pertusariicola Halıcı (2010) – host: Varicellaria lactea
- Weddellomyces protearius Nav.-Ros. & Cl.Roux (1997) – host: Leproplaca proteus and Rusavskia elegans
- Weddellomyces turcicus Halıcı & Orange (2006) – host: Acarospora
- Weddellomyces xanthoparmeliae Calat. & Nav.-Ros. (1998) – host: Xanthoparmelia

Two species once placed in this genus have since been reclassified:

- Weddellomyces geographicicola (Arnold) Alstrup & D.Hawksw. (1990) is now known as Opegrapha geographicicola
- Weddellomyces tartaricola (Linds.) Alstrup & D.Hawksw. (1990) is now known as Pseudopyrenidium tartaricola.
