= Peltigera islandica =

Scientific classification
- Kingdom: Fungi
- Division: Ascomycota
- Class: Lecanoromycetes
- Order: Peltigerales
- Family: Peltigeraceae
- Genus: Peltigera
- Species: P. islandica

Binomial name
- Peltigera islandica Goward & S.S.Manoharan-Basil (2016)
- Holotype: Thverás, Iceland

Species of lichen

Peltigera islandica is a cyanolichen indigenous to Iceland. Discovered in 2016, it is likely that specimens currently labelled as P. membranaceae or P. neorufescens could in fact be P. islandica. This species is known to occur in Iceland, Estonia, and Western and Northern Canada.

== Taxonomy ==
Peltigera islandica was formally described as a new species in 2016 by Trevor Goward and Sheeba Manoharan-Basil. The species belongs to the section Peltigera (also known as the 'P. canina group') within the genus Peltigera in the family Peltigeraceae. The species name islandica refers to Iceland, where the species was first recognized and subsequently described. The holotype specimen (OSA392) was collected on 5 August 2015, by Ólafur Andrésson from Thverás, where it was growing on soil with grass and moss, under Arctic willow (Salix arctica) and common heather (Calluna vulgaris) by a driveway in a residential neighbourhood. Isotypes (duplicates) are deposited in the herbaria of the University of British Columbia (UBC) and the University of Helsinki (H).

Prior to its formal description, material of this species from British Columbia, Canada had been provisionally referred to as Peltigera sp. A in taxonomic literature. Molecular phylogenetics analysis of the nuclear ribosomal internal transcribed spacer (ITS) region revealed that specimens from Iceland were 99% identical (546/547 nucleotides) to the undescribed Canadian material.

Peltigera islandica is distinguished from other members of the section Peltigera by a distinct molecular characteristic: the absence of the hypervariable region in the ITS1 (ITS1-HR), which is present in all other currently recognized species in this section. Phylogenetic analysis places P. islandica as a distinct monophyletic lineage within the P. canina species complex.

== Description ==
Peltigera islandica is a foliose (leaf-like) lichen species with a thallus that typically measures 1.5–3.0 cm across. The lobes are thin, brittle, and relatively narrow (5–10 mm, occasionally up to 15 mm wide), loosely overlapping, and irregularly branching. A distinctive feature of this species is its predominantly downturned lobe tips, which are rounded in shape. The lobe margins are mostly even and not crisped.

When moist, the upper surface of P. islandica is typically bright emerald green, though a dark khaki green colour morph also exists. When dry, the surface appears pale bluish grey to purplish brown. The surface is dull and often distinctly billowed, with tomentum (a fine, hair-like covering) near the lobe tips that becomes sparse or absent toward the thallus centre. The tomentum may be appressed or occasionally partially erect. The species lacks soredia, isidia, and marginal lobules.

The lower surface features distinct veins that are whitish near the edges, gradually becoming medium brown towards the centre. These veins are narrow to somewhat broad, low to more often raised, and typically lack tomentum, though some specimens show distinct erect-tomentose veins. Between the veins are white, lenticular to occasionally polygonal interstices (spaces) that are moderately deeply set.

Rhizines, which anchor the lichen to its substrate, match the colour of the veins and show considerable variation. They may be discrete, flocculent (appearing like tufts of wool), or form hedge-like rows towards the lobe tips. Inwards, they become mostly thread-like and unbranched, measuring 2–3 mm (occasionally up to 5 mm) in length. The rhizines either lack tomentum or sometimes are distinctly erect-tomentose.

In cross-section, the cortex measures approximately 250–300 μm thick, with a photobiont layer of 150–175 μm containing the cyanobacterium Nostoc as its photosynthetic partner. The medulla is white and about 450–550 μm thick. Apothecia (fruiting bodies) have not been observed in this species. All standard lichen spot tests (C, K, KC, and PD) yield negative results on both the cortex and medulla, indicating the lack of secondary metabolites.

== Habitat and distribution ==
Peltigera islandica is known from Iceland and southern intermontane British Columbia, Canada. In Iceland, specimens have been found in several localities across the southwestern part of the country, including Öskjuhlíd (a hill in Reykjavík), Thverás (in a residential neighbourhood in Reykjavík), near the River Þjórsá, and in the vicinity of Hrauneyjafoss in the southern highlands.

This lichen appears to favour areas that have experienced some form of disturbance. At Öskjuhlíd, specimens were found growing beside recreational trails that had been laid on top of buried municipal water pipes, in an area that was cleared in the 1940s and later revegetated through afforestation with downy birch (Betula pubescens), Sitka spruce (Picea sitchensis), and mountain pine (Pinus mugo). Similarly, at Thverás, specimens were collected from previously bare soil beside a residential driveway built in 1989.

Peltigera islandica grows directly on soil, often in small patches of a few lobes. It can be found growing alongside mosses like Hylocomium splendens, grasses, and under vegetation such as Salix arctica (Arctic willow) and Calluna vulgaris (common heather). The species may occur alone or with other Peltigera species in the same vicinity, including P. membranacea, P. monticola, P. praetextata, P. rufescens, and P. neckeri.

Based on molecular analysis of a metagenomic sample from the Canadian Arctic, there is evidence suggesting the species may also be present in that region, though further investigation is needed to confirm its broader distribution in climatically similar regions. In 2017, the species was reported from Estonia, and in 2022, it was recorded from Nunavut in the Canadian Arctic.
