= Lichenopeltella coppinsii =

Scientific classification
- Kingdom: Fungi
- Division: Ascomycota
- Class: Dothideomycetes
- Order: Microthyriales
- Family: Microthyriaceae
- Genus: Lichenopeltella
- Species: L. coppinsii

Binomial name
- Lichenopeltella coppinsii Earl.-Benn. & D.Hawksw. (1999)

Synonyms
- Lichenopeltella coppinsii Höhn.

Species of fungus

Lichenopeltella coppinsii is a species of lichenicolous fungus belonging to the class Dothideomycetes. It is known to infect the rock-dwelling crustose lichen Verrucaria muralis. The fungus has been reported from the British Isles, Ukraine, and Moshchny Island in the Baltic sea.

== Taxonomy ==
The fungus was described in 1999 by Peter Michael Earland-Bennett and David L. Hawksworth, who named it in honour of the lichenologist Brian J. Coppins for his contributions to the study of lichens and lichenicolous fungi. When L. coppinsii was described, it became the third species of Lichenopeltella formally reported from Great Britain and Ireland, following L. cetrariicola (which grows on Cetraria islandica) and L. peltigericola (which grows on Peltigera species).

== Description ==
The fungus produces small, black, disc-shaped fruiting bodies called ascomatathat are visible on the surface of its host lichen. These ascomata measure about 100–125 micrometres (μm) in diameter and have a distinctive structure with a dark red-brown upper plate composed of thickened cells arranged in radiating rows. The ascomata lack setae (hair-like structures) around their opening (ostiole).

Inside the ascomata, the fungus produces narrowly obclavate (inversely club-shaped) spore sacs called asci, measuring 45–66 by 14.5–16 μm. Each ascus contains eight spores. The ascospores are oblong-ellipsoid with rounded ends, measuring 12.5–15 by 4.5–5 μm. They typically have one septum (a cross-wall dividing the spore), although they occasionally develop up to three septa. A distinctive feature of these ascospores is the presence of 2–4 fine, hair-like appendages (setulae) that emerge from a single point on the spore and can extend up to 19 μm in length.

Lichenopeltella coppinsii has been found growing on the thallus (body) of the lichen Verrucaria muralis, particularly on brownish areas of this lichen. While the precise nature of its relationship with the host is uncertain, it is believed to be commensalistic (benefiting without significantly harming the host) rather than parasitic, as is common for many species in the genus Lichenopeltella.
