= Dacampia rufescentis =

Scientific classification
- Kingdom: Fungi
- Division: Ascomycota
- Class: Dothideomycetes
- Order: Pleosporales
- Family: Dacampiaceae
- Genus: Dacampia
- Species: D. rufescentis

Binomial name
- Dacampia rufescentis (Vouaux) D.Hawksw.

Species of fungus

Dacampia rufescentis is a species of fungus belonging to the family Dacampiaceae. It is a lichenicolous fungus which uses Peltigera rufescens as a host species.

It is native to Europe.
