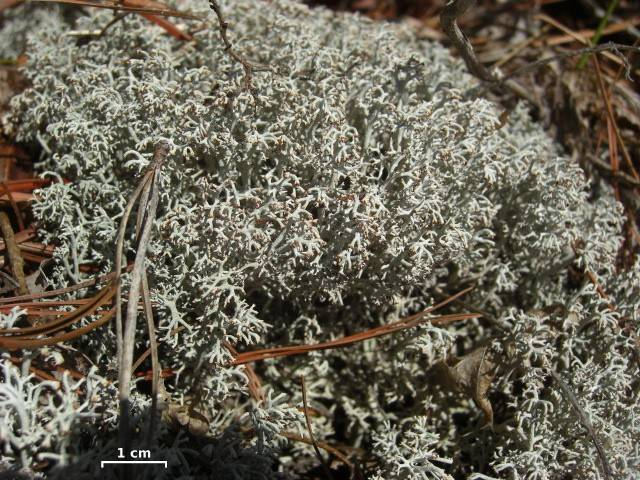

Conservation status
- Secure (NatureServe)

Scientific classification
- Kingdom: Fungi
- Division: Ascomycota
- Class: Lecanoromycetes
- Order: Lecanorales
- Family: Cladoniaceae
- Genus: Cladonia
- Species: C. rangiferina

Binomial name
- Cladonia rangiferina (L.) Weber (1780)

Synonyms
- List: Lichen rangiferinus L. (1753); Verrucaria rangiferina (L.) Humb. (1793); Baeomyces rangiferinus (L.) Ach. (1803); Capitularia rangiferina (L.) Mart. (1817); Patellaria foliacea var. rangiferina (L.) Wallr. (1829); Patellaria rangiferina (L.) Wallr. (1831); Cladonia fusca var. rangiferina (L.) Rabenh. (1840); Cladina rangiferina (L.) Nyl. (1866); Cladonia rangiferina var. abbayesii Ahti (1961); Cladina rangiferina subsp. abbayesii (Ahti) W.L.Culb. (1983); Cladonia rangiferina subsp. abbayesii (Ahti) Ahti & DePriest (2001)

= Cladonia rangiferina =

Species of lichen-forming fungus

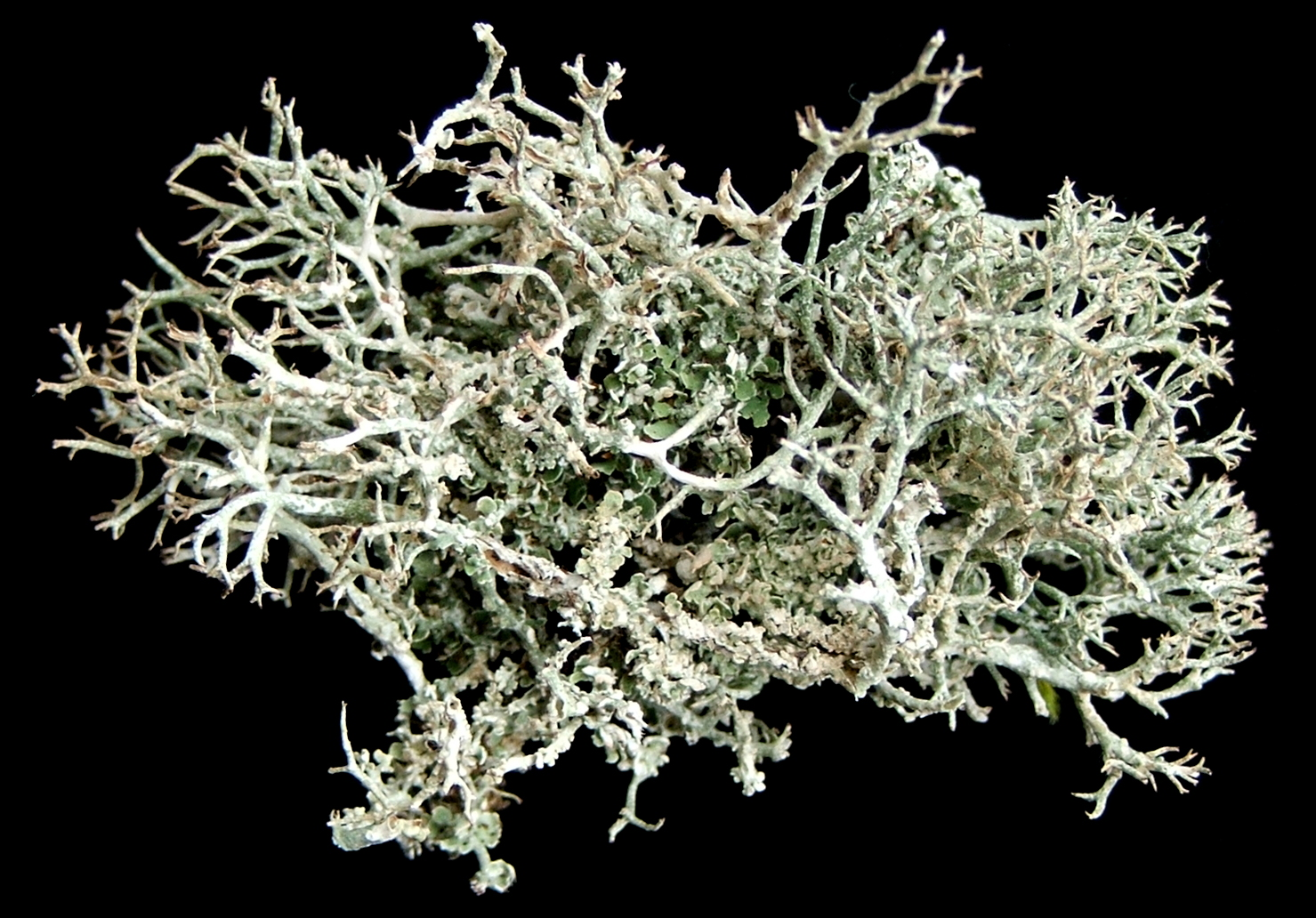
Top view of C. rangiferina

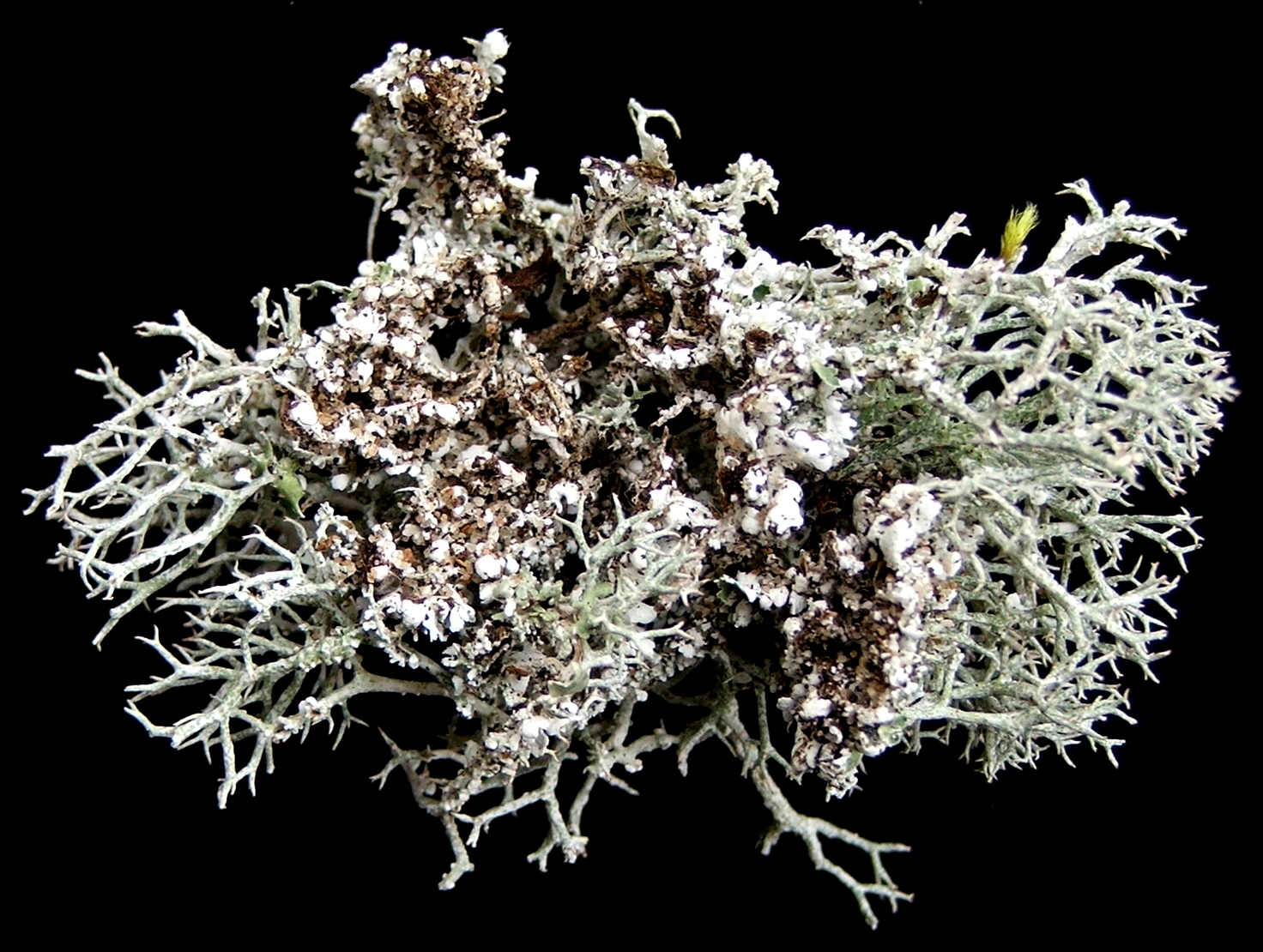
The underside of C. rangiferina

Cladonia rangiferina, also known as reindeer cup lichen, reindeer lichen (cf. Sw. renlav) or grey reindeer lichen, is a light-coloured fruticose, cup lichen species in the family Cladoniaceae. It grows in both hot and cold climates in well-drained, open environments. Found primarily in areas of alpine tundra, it is extremely cold-hardy.

Other common names include reindeer moss, deer moss, and caribou moss, but these names can be misleading since it is, though somewhat moss-like in appearance, not a moss. As the common names suggest, reindeer lichen is an important food for reindeer (caribou), and has economic importance as a result. Synonyms include Cladina rangiferina and Lichen rangiferinus.

== Taxonomy ==
Cladonia rangiferina was first scientifically described by Carl Linnaeus in his 1753 Species Plantarum; as was the custom at the time, he classified it in the eponymous genus, as Lichen rangiferinus. Friedrich Heinrich Wiggers transferred it to the genus Cladonia in 1780.

== Description ==
Thalli are fruticose, and extensively branched, with each branch usually dividing into three or four (sometimes two); the thicker branches are typically 1–1.5 millimetres (1/32–1/16 inch) in diameter. The colour is greyish, whitish or brownish grey. C. rangiferina forms extensive mats up to 10 centimetres (4 in) tall. The branching is at a smaller angle than that of Cladonia portentosa. It lacks a well-defined cortex (a protective layer covering the thallus, analogous to the epidermis in plants), but rather, a loose layer of hyphae cover the photobionts. The photobiont associated with the reindeer lichen is Trebouxia irregularis. When fertile, the terminal branches often divide into short umbrella-shaped clusters; the apothecia that develop there are typically carried just below the actively growing branch tips and can be concealed within the cushion.

Reindeer lichen, like many lichens, is slow growing (3–11 millimetres or 1/8–3/8 inch per year) and may take decades to return once overgrazed, burned, trampled, or otherwise damaged.

A similar-looking but distinct species, also known by the common name "reindeer lichen", is Cladonia portentosa.

=== Chemistry ===
The main secondary constituents of C. rangiferina are depside atranorin and depsidone fumarprotocetraric acid. A variety of other bioactive compounds have been isolated and identified from C. rangiferina, including abietane, labdane, isopimarane, the abietane diterpenoids hanagokenols A and B, obtuanhydride, sugiol, 5,6-dehydrosugiol, montbretol, cis-communic acid, imbricatolic acid, 15-acetylimbricatoloic acid, junicedric acid, 7α-hydroxysandaracopimaric acid, β-resorylic acid, atronol, barbatic acid, homosekikaic acid, didymic acid and condidymic acid. Some of these compounds have mild inhibitory activities against methicillin-resistant Staphylococcus aureus and vancomycin-resistant Enterococci.

== Resynthesis ==
Resynthesis experiments have been conducted to study the early stages of lichen formation in Cladonia rangiferina. These experiments involve isolating and culturing the fungal and algal partners separately, then reuniting them under laboratory conditions to observe the process of lichenization. Through these studies, researchers have identified several key stages in the early development of the lichen thallus.

The first stage, known as the pre-contact stage, occurs around one day post co-inoculation. During this stage, no apparent fungal or algal growth is observed, and hyphal tips are not growing towards algal cells. By the eighth day post co-inoculation, the contact stage is reached. This stage is characterised by rich branching of fungal hyphae with short internodes. Hyphal tips grow towards algal cells, and some form swollen tips called appressoria upon contact. Hyphae can be observed growing around single algal cells or clusters, and mucilage is frequently present. The growth together stage is typically observed around 21 days post co-inoculation. At this point, coordinated growth between the fungus and alga becomes evident. Algal cells are integrated within a hyphal matrix, with hyphae emerging through algal colonies and forming networks within and between them.

Quantitative measurements during these stages reveal several patterns. In compatible interactions, researchers observe significantly shorter hyphal internode lengths and more lateral branches compared to incompatible ones. The frequency of appressoria formation increases over time in compatible interactions. There is no significant reduction in algal cell diameter in compatible interactions, unlike in some incompatible pairings. These experiments highlight the specificity of the Cladonia rangiferina – Asterochloris glomerata/irregularis symbiosis. When paired with incompatible algae such as Coccomyxa peltigerae or Chloroidium ellipsoideum, C. rangiferina shows reduced growth and fewer symbiosis-specific morphological changes.

The resynthesis process in C. rangiferina appears to be slower compared to some other lichen species. A well-organised prethallus stage has not been observed even after three months of co-cultivation. This may be due to specific environmental requirements or growth conditions needed for complete thallus formation in this species. These studies provide insights into the recognition mechanisms and early developmental processes involved in lichen formation. The observations support the concept of controlled parasitism in lichen symbiosis, where the fungal partner exhibits parasitic behavior, but in a controlled manner that allows for mutual benefit in the long term.

=== Reproduction and life history ===
Field studies show that C. rangiferina does, in fact, produce many small apothecia when conditions are favourable, but they are easy to miss. As the fertile tips begin to form the fruiting bodies, new sterile branches grow past them and become the visible top of the cushion, so the mature apothecia end up hidden just below the surface layer. This growth pattern lets the lichen keep expanding vegetatively while reproducing sexually. It is a polycarpic species with a lifespan of about 20–30 years, capable of producing sexual propagules throughout its life once apothecia have developed.

At humid sites the species often becomes fertile across many branch tips at once, and the fertile tips frequently split into umbrella-like clusters that can bear several tiny discs (about 2 mm across). The study found that these apothecia release abundant, readily germinating ascospores, suggesting that sexual reproduction contributes to long-distance dispersal.

== Habitat and distribution ==
Cladonia rangiferina often dominates the ground in boreal pine forests and open, low-alpine sites in a wide range of habitats, from humid, open forests, rocks and heaths. It grows on humus, or on soil over rock. It is mainly found in the taiga and the tundra. A specific biome in which this lichen is represented is the boreal forests of Canada. In Nepal, Cladonia rangiferina has been reported from 3,400 to 4,500 m elevation in a compilation of published records; this reported range extends above the tree line used in the study.

Cladonia rangiferina has a strong tolerance for extreme stress such as freezing, dehydration, UV light and high salinity. Experiments discovered that the lichen will continue with respiration even after liquid-nitrogen immersion, severe drying, saturated salt exposure and temperatures down to -40°C.

== Ecology ==
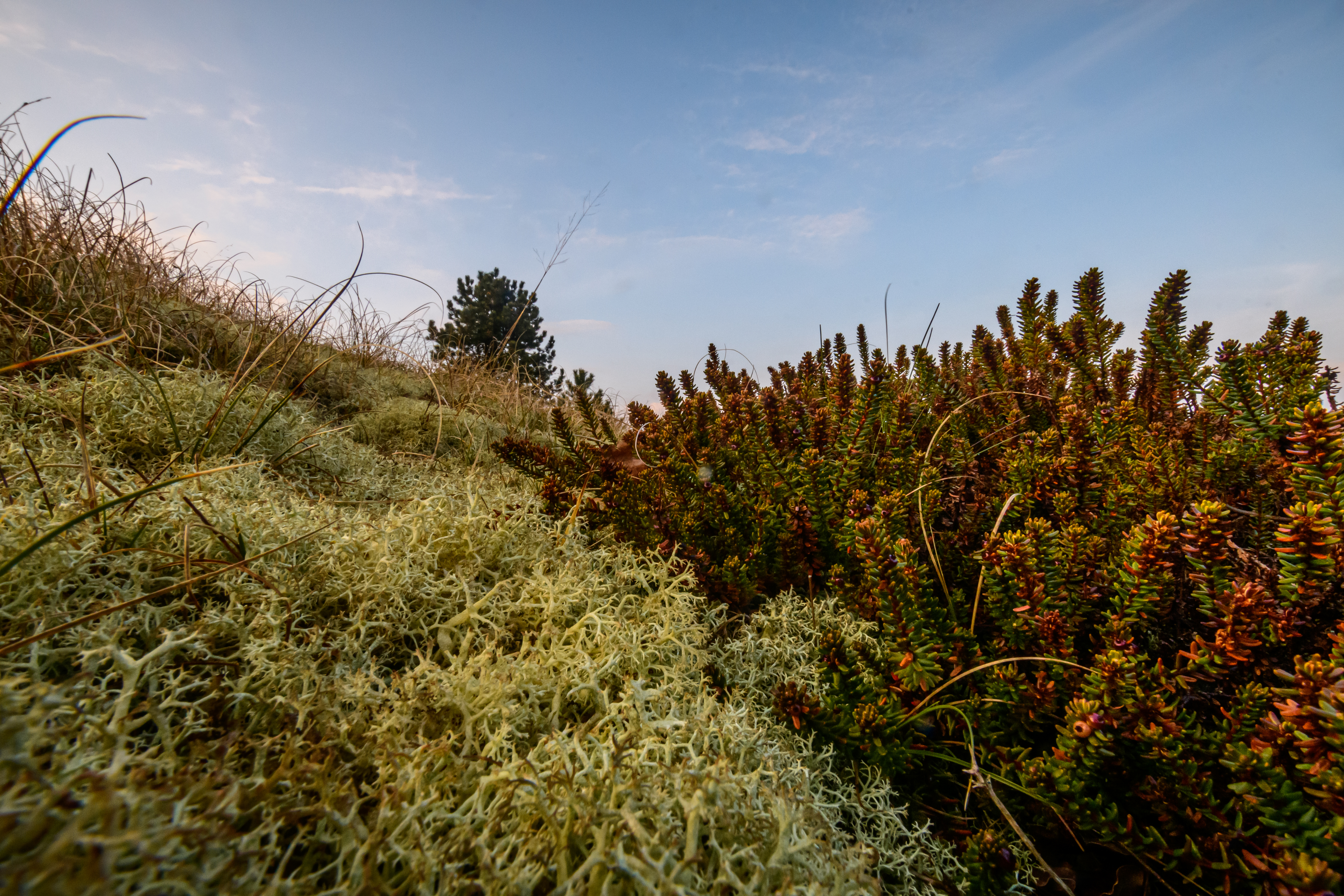
Brown dune on Spiekeroog, Germany, showing Cladonia rangiferina growing beside black crowberry (Empetrum nigrum).

The fertility of Cladonia rangiferina varies with microclimate. In sites with good water relations and high air humidity, cushions commonly develop numerous apothecia and taller podetia (to roughly 12 cm), whereas in drier places fertile thalli are scarcer and podetia are shorter (about 4–6 cm). In a Finnish study of the growth rate of Cladonia rangiferina, it was found that the lichen grows from 3.9 to 4.4 mm per year, achieving the fastest growth rate in younger (less than 60 years), shadowy forests, and the slowest growth in an older (more than 180 years), thinned forest.

Cladonia rangiferina is a known host to the lichenicolous fungus species Lichenopeltella rangiferinae, which is named after C. rangiferina, Lichenoconium pyxidatae and Lichenopeltella uncialicola.

== Conservation ==
In certain parts of its range, this lichen is an endangered species. For example, in the British Duchy of Cornwall it is protected under the UK Biodiversity Action Plan.

== Uses ==
The reindeer lichen is edible, but crunchy. It can be soaked with wood ashes to remove its bitterness, then added to milk or other dishes. It is a source of vitamin D.

This lichen can be used in the making of aquavit, and is sometimes used as decoration in glass windows. The lichen is used as a traditional remedy for removal of kidney stones by the Monpa in the alpine regions of the West Kameng district of Eastern Himalaya. The Inland Dena'ina used reindeer lichen for food by crushing the dry lichen and then boiling it or soaking it in hot water until it becomes soft. They eat it plain or, preferably, mixed with berries, fish eggs, or lard. The Inland Dena'ina also boil reindeer lichen and drink the juice as a medicine for diarrhea. Acids present in lichens mean their consumption may cause an upset stomach, especially if not well cooked.

Reindeer lichen is also popular in model railroading where it is used for shrubbery and to make model trees.

According to a study published in 2017, reindeer lichen was able to grow on burnt soil as soon as two years after a forest fire in Northern Sweden, indicating that artificial replanting of lichen could be a useful strategy for the restoration of reindeer pastures.

== See also ==
- List of Cladonia species
- List of lichens named by Carl Linnaeus
