= C20H32O4 =

The molecular formula C_{20}H_{32}O_{4} may refer to:

- Arachidonic acid 5-hydroperoxide
- Hepoxilin
- Mercusic acid
- Leukotriene B4 (LTB4)
- the main (acid resin) constituent of frankincense resin
