= Lichenopeltella =

Scientific classification
- Kingdom: Fungi
- Division: Ascomycota
- Class: Dothideomycetes
- Order: Microthyriales
- Family: Microthyriaceae
- Genus: Lichenopeltella; Höhn. (1919)

Type species
- Lichenopeltella maculans (Zopf) Höhn. (1919)

Genus of fungi

Lichenopeltella is a genus of fungi in the family Microthyriaceae. It comprises about 50 species. The genus was established in 1919 by the mycologist Franz Xaver Rudolf von Höhnel, and its classification within fungal families has been revised several times as scientists better understand its relationships. Nearly all species in the genus are specialized parasites that live on lichens rather than forming lichens themselves, often targeting specific host species. These fungi are found worldwide and are recognized by their tiny, shield-like fruiting bodies that develop on the surface of their lichen hosts.

== Systematics ==
Lichenopeltella is a genus of ascomycetous fungi circumscribed by the mycologist Franz Xaver Rudolf von Höhnel in 1919. Höhnel established the genus as monotypic, with Lichenopeltella maculans as the type species. This species was originally described as Microthyrium maculans by Friedrich Wilhelm Zopf in 1898, but Höhnel created Lichenopeltella to accommodate it, reflecting its lichen-associated nature. Over time, many fungi now placed in Lichenopeltella were originally described under other genera such as Actinopeltis, Micropeltis, or Trichothyrina. In fact, most of the "core" species of Lichenopeltella were initially assigned to those genera. Subsequent taxonomic work by Rolf Santesson and others determined that Micropeltis and Trichothyrina are synonyms of Lichenopeltella, leading to numerous recombinations of species into Lichenopeltella.

As of 2020 Lichenopeltella included about 48 species worldwide. In the 1990s, the mycologist Paul Diederich significantly expanded the genus by describing 11 new species and providing a key to the 26 lichenicolous species known at that time. The genus name itself reflects its ecology: Lichenopeltella meaning "small lichen shield", in reference to the tiny shield-like fruiting bodies on lichens.

In terms of higher-level classification, Lichenopeltella has had a somewhat unsettled placement. Historically it was included in the family Leptopeltidaceae (order Microthyriales) by Müller & von Arx (1962) and others. This was because of its superficial, disk-like ascomata resembling those of Leptopeltis and related genera. However, more recent classifications have revised its position. Lumbsch and Huhndorf (2010) left Lichenopeltella as incertae sedis (unplaced) within Dothideomycetes, and a 2011 reappraisal by Wu and colleagues argued that it fits best in the family Trichothyriaceae. This move was based on Lichenopeltella's lichenicolous (lichen-dwelling) lifestyle, which it shares with other Trichothyriaceae members. Indeed, the Outline of Fungi (2020) treats Lichenopeltella's familial and ordinal placement as unresolved (incertae sedis) but notes it "may be in Trichothyriaceae". In the 2014 classification of Dothideomycetes, Lichenopeltella is listed under Trichothyriaceae alongside genera like Trichothyrium and Pachythyrium. Thus, while older sources placed it in Microthyriaceae (hence some literature still cites it there), current consensus leans toward Trichothyriaceae in the order Microthyriales (or a related order), pending molecular confirmation. A 2012 study suggested merging Lichenopeltella into the plant-pathogenic genus Kellermania, but later researchers rejected that, maintaining Lichenopeltella as distinct.

== Habitat, distribution, and ecology ==
Nearly all Lichenopeltella species are lichenicolous fungi, meaning they live on lichens (the fungal partner parasitizes a lichen thallus). They do not form lichens themselves but instead grow on the surface (or occasionally slightly embedded in the cortex) of lichen hosts as parasites or commensals. Lichenopeltella has been recorded on a wide variety of lichen hosts, usually exhibiting high host-specificity: many species infect only a single lichen genus or even a single host species. For example, Lichenopeltella coppinsii was discovered growing on the crustose lichen species Verrucaria muralis in England. Lichenopeltella heterodermiicola infects the foliose lichen Heterodermia speciosa, with occurrences reported in Arkansas (USA) and Ecuador. Lichenopeltella arctomiae and L. biatorae, described in 2009, parasitize specific microlichens (Arctomia delicatula and Biatora flavopunctata, respectively) in the Pacific Northwest of North America. Other hosts documented include Cladonia (for L. cladoniarum on reindeer lichens), Lobaria (L. lobariae on lungwort lichens), Hypogymnia, Peltigera, Thelidium, Heppia, and more, spanning multiple lichen families. By the late 1990s, at least 26 lichenicolous species of Lichenopeltella were known worldwide, and the number has since grown to around 50 species with new discoveries in Europe, North America, Asia, and beyond.

== Fossil record ==
Lichenopeltella has a substantial temporal range: a fossil species has been described from ancient deposits. Lichenopeltella mizerniana, described in 2020, was discovered in Upper Pliocene (roughly 3 million years old) sediment from southern Poland. The fossil consisted of minute, shield-shaped fruiting bodies covered with stiff, hair-like bristles (setose thyriothecia) on a leaf, closely resembling modern Lichenopeltella in structure.

== Species ==
As of August 2025, Species Fungorum (in the Catalogue of Life) accepts 51 species of Lichenopeltella.

- Lichenopeltella alpestris (Sacc.) P.M.Kirk & Minter (2007)
- Lichenopeltella ammophilae (J.P.Ellis) P.M.Kirk & Minter (2007)
- Lichenopeltella arctomiae Pérez-Ort. & T.Sprib. (2009)
- Lichenopeltella biatorae Pérez-Ort. & T.Sprib. (2009)
- Lichenopeltella bunodophoronis Diederich (1997)
- Lichenopeltella cetrariae (Bres.) Höhn. (1919)
- Lichenopeltella cetrariicola (Nyl.) R.Sant. (1989)
- Lichenopeltella cladoniarum E.S.Hansen & Alstrup (1995)
- Lichenopeltella communis Etayo (2010)
- Lichenopeltella coppinsii Earl.-Benn. & D.Hawksw. (1999)
- Lichenopeltella cupularum (J.P.Ellis) P.M.Kirk & Minter (2007)
- Lichenopeltella epiphylla R.Sant. (1988)
- Lichenopeltella fimbriata (J.P.Ellis) P.M.Kirk & Minter (2007)
- Lichenopeltella heppiae van den Boom (2012)
- Lichenopeltella heterodermiae Diederich (1997)
- Lichenopeltella heterodermiicola M.S.Cole & D.Hawksw. (2002)
- Lichenopeltella hydrophila R.Sant. (2001)
- Lichenopeltella hypogymniae Diederich (1997)
- Lichenopeltella hypotrachynae Diederich (1997)
- Lichenopeltella leprosulae Pérez-Ort. & T.Sprib. (2009)
- Lichenopeltella leptogii Diederich (1997)
- Lichenopeltella lobariae Etayo & Diederich (1996)
- Lichenopeltella maculans (Zopf) Höhn. (1919)
- Lichenopeltella megalosporae Diederich (1997)
- Lichenopeltella microspora Diederich (1997)
- Lichenopeltella minuta R.Sant. (1989)
- Lichenopeltella mizerniana G.Worobiec (2020)
- Lichenopeltella mobergii Zhurb. (2021)
- Lichenopeltella nigroannulata (J.Webster) P.M.Kirk & Minter (2007)
- Lichenopeltella norfolciana (J.P.Ellis) P.M.Kirk & Minter (2007)
- Lichenopeltella palustris (J.P.Ellis) P.M.Kirk & Minter (2007)
- Lichenopeltella pannariacearum Diederich (1997)
- Lichenopeltella peltigericola (D.Hawksw.) R.Sant. (1993)
- Lichenopeltella physciae Diederich (1997)
- Lichenopeltella pinophylla (Höhn.) P.M.Kirk & Minter (2007)
- Lichenopeltella pseudocyphellariae Diederich (1997)
- Lichenopeltella quinquecladiopsis (E.B.G.Jones, Sivichai & Hywel-Jones) E.B.G.Jones & D.Hawksw. (2001)
- Lichenopeltella ramalinae Etayo & Diederich (1997)
- Lichenopeltella rangiferinae Brackel (2011)
- Lichenopeltella sakhalinensis Zhurb. (2025)
- Lichenopeltella salicis (J.P.Ellis) P.M.Kirk & Minter (2007)
- Lichenopeltella santessonii (P.M.Kirk & Spooner) R.Sant. (1993)
- Lichenopeltella sclerenchymatica Etayo (2008)
- Lichenopeltella setifera Matzer (1996)
- Lichenopeltella soiliae Zhurb. & Pino-Bodas (2015)
- Lichenopeltella stereocaulorum Zhurb. (2010)
- Lichenopeltella swaminathaniana Harih., Mibey & D.Hawksw. (1996)
- Lichenopeltella thalamica Etayo, Flakus & Kukwa (2017)
- Lichenopeltella thamnoliae R.Sant. (1998)
- Lichenopeltella thelidii Diederich (1998)
- Lichenopeltella uncialicola Brackel (2010)
