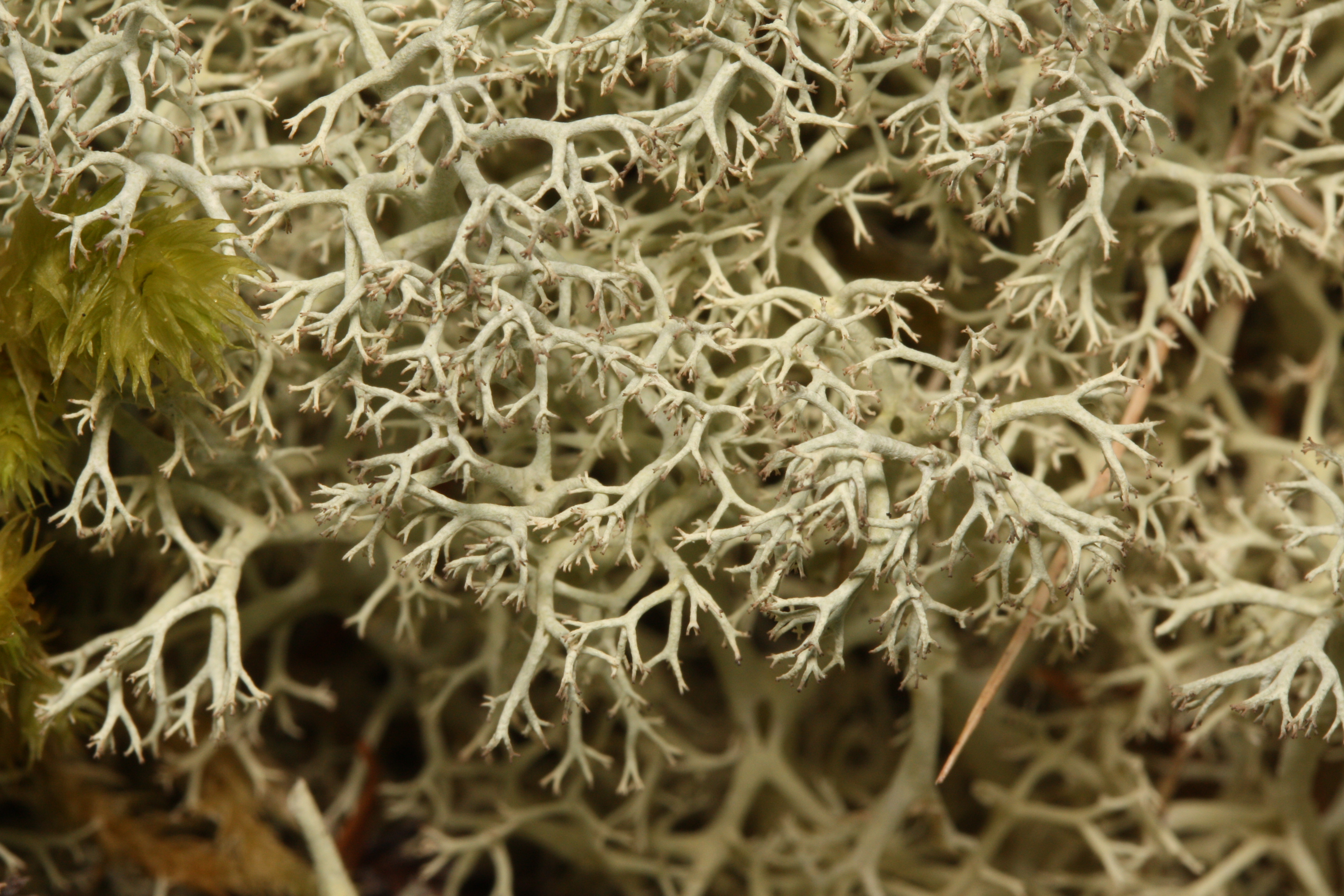

Conservation status
- Secure (NatureServe)

Scientific classification
- Kingdom: Fungi
- Division: Ascomycota
- Class: Lecanoromycetes
- Order: Lecanorales
- Family: Cladoniaceae
- Genus: Cladonia
- Species: C. portentosa

Binomial name
- Cladonia portentosa (Dufour) Coem. (1865)

= Cladonia portentosa =

Species of lichen

Cladonia portentosa, also known as reindeer lichen or the cream cup lichen, is a light-coloured, fruticose, cup lichen in the family Cladoniaceae.

A similar-looking species, also known by the common name "reindeer lichen", is Cladonia rangiferina.

== Description ==
Cladonia portentosa forms compact interwoven mats up to 6 cm tall. It is richly branched, each branch usually dividing into three but with the penultimate sometimes dividing into two. The branching is at a larger angle than that of Cladonia rangiferina.

== Ecology ==
Cladonia portentosa is a known host for the lichenicolous fungus species Lichenopeltella cladoniarum.

== Conservation status ==
As of July 2021, its conservation status has not been estimated by the IUCN. In Iceland, its conservation status is denoted as data deficient (DD).

== See also ==
- List of Cladonia species

== Illustrations ==
Gilbert, O. 2004.
