= Lichenopeltella heppiae =

Scientific classification
- Kingdom: Fungi
- Division: Ascomycota
- Class: Dothideomycetes
- Order: Microthyriales
- Family: Microthyriaceae
- Genus: Lichenopeltella
- Species: L. heppiae

Binomial name
- Lichenopeltella heppiae van den Boom (2012)

Species of lichen

Lichenopeltella heppiae is a rare species of lichenicolous (lichen-dwelling) fungus in the family Lichenopeltella. It grows on the thallus and apothecia of Heppia despreauxii.

== Taxonomy ==
Lichenopeltella heppiae was first described by Dutch lichenologist Pieter van den Boom as a new species in 2012. The type specimen was found in the Algarve region of Portugal, northeast of Albufeira, growing on Heppia despreauxii. The species name, heppiae, is derived from the host genus of the fungus.

== Description ==
Lichenopeltella heppiae is characterized by its black, spherical ascomata that are in the form of catathecia, which measure 100 to 150 μm in diameter. The asci are cylindrical to narrowly clavate and 8-spored, measuring 35–55 by 15–18 μm. The hyaline ascospores are clavate (club-shaped), contain a single septum, measure 14–17 by 5.5–7 μm, and feature three pairs of curved setulae at the top.

Pycnidia have not been observed in Lichenopeltella heppiae. The fungus is not known to cause any damage to its host, Heppia despreauxii.

=== Similar species ===
Lichenopeltella species are generally host-specific. While Lichenopeltella heppiae shares some characteristics with other known Lichenopeltella species, it is most closely related to Lichenopeltella arctomiae. Both species have setulae at the tips of the upper cell of the ascospores; however, L. arctomiae has longer ascospores, typically measuring 17–18.6–20 by 5–5.9–6.5 μm.

== Habitat and distribution ==
Lichenopeltella heppiae has only been found at its type locality in the Algarve region of Portugal. It grows abundantly on the terricolous (ground-dwelling) host species Heppia despreauxii in a wide, open, gently sloping area among low calcareous outcrops. Other lichens observed in the same habitat include Epiphloea terrena, Heppia echinulata, Heppia solorinoides, Squamarina cartilaginea, and Squamarina concrescens.
