= Pyrenidium =

Scientific classification
- Kingdom: Fungi
- Division: Ascomycota
- Class: Dothideomycetes
- Order: Pleosporales
- Family: Pyrenidiaceae; Zahlbr. (1898)
- Genus: Pyrenidium; Nyl. (1865)

Type species
- Pyrenidium actinellum Nyl. (1865)

Synonyms
- Dacampiosphaeria D.Hawksw. (1980); Pyrenidiomyces Cif. & Tomas. (1953)

Genus of lichens

Pyrenidium is a genus of lichenicolous (lichen-dwelling) fungi. It is the only genus in the family Pyrenidiaceae. It has 13 species.

== Taxonomy ==
The genus was circumscribed by Finnish lichenologist William Nylander in 1865, with Pyrenidium actinellum assigned as the type species. The family was originally proposed by Alexander Zahlbruckner in 1898, and later resurrected for use in 2019. Pyrenidium was previously classified in Dacampiaceae, but molecular phylogenetic analysis showed that this family was polyphyletic, and that Pyrenidium originated from a lineage distinct from the genera in that family.

== Description ==
Members of the genus have ascomata that are perithecioid in form, often with blue-green pigment in the upper wall of the peridia. Their ascomata are either immersed in the host thallus, or bursting through surface (erumpent), exposing the upper part of the structure (sometimes still covered by tissue of the host thalli). They have bitunicate asci that contain from four to eight ascospores. Infection by the fungus sometimes causes gall-like malformations of the host thallus.

== Species ==
As of September 2022, Species Fungorum (in the Catalogue of Life) accepts 13 species of Pyrenidium:

- Pyrenidium actinellum Nyl. (1865)
- Pyrenidium aggregatum Knudsen & Kocourk. (2010)
- Pyrenidium borbonicum Huanraluek, Ertz & K.D.Hyde (2019)
- Pyrenidium coccineum Aptroot (2014)
- Pyrenidium cryptotheciae Matzer (1996)
- Pyrenidium hetairizans (Leight.) D.Hawksw. (1986)
- Pyrenidium hypotrachynae Y.Joshi (2018)
- Pyrenidium macrosporum Motiej., Zhurb., Suija & Kantvilas (2018)
- Pyrenidium octosporum Looman (1963)
- Pyrenidium santessonii Lücking (1998)
- Pyrenidium sporopodiorum Matzer (1996)
- Pyrenidium ucrainicum S.Y.Kondr., Lőkös & Hur (2014)
- Pyrenidium zamiae (Müll.Arg.) Matzer (1996)
