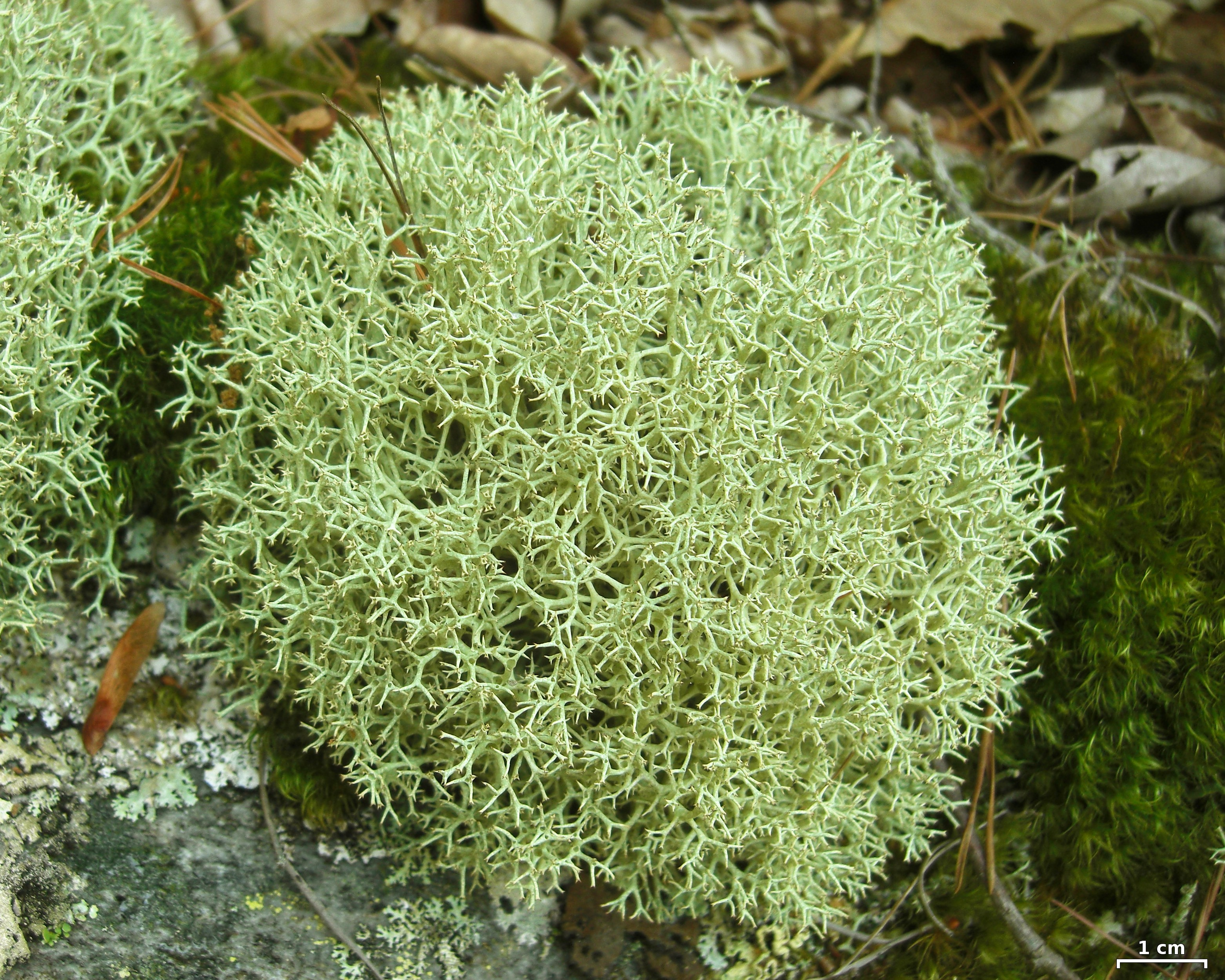

Conservation status
- Secure (NatureServe)

Scientific classification
- Kingdom: Fungi
- Division: Ascomycota
- Class: Lecanoromycetes
- Order: Lecanorales
- Family: Cladoniaceae
- Genus: Cladonia
- Species: C. uncialis

Binomial name
- Cladonia uncialis (L.) Weber ex F.H.Wigg. (1780)

Synonyms
- Lichen uncialis L. (1753)

= Cladonia uncialis =

Species of lichen-forming fungus

Cladonia uncialis is a species of fruticose, cup lichen in the family Cladoniaceae. It was first described as a new species by Swedish taxonomist Carl Linnaeus in 1753. It was transferred to the genus Cladonia by Friedrich Heinrich Wiggers in 1780. In North America, the lichen is colloquially known as the thorn Cladonia or the thorn cup lichen.

Cladonia uncialis is host to the lichenicolous fungus species Lichenopeltella uncialicola, which is named after C. uncialis.

== Genomics ==
In 2026, a chromosome-level genome assembly was published for the fungal partner (mycobiont) of Cladonia uncialis. Using long-read (PacBio HiFi) and chromosome-conformation (Hi-C) sequencing data, the authors assembled a 43.49 Mb genome, with 39.25 Mb anchored into 28 chromosomes, and reported high assembly completeness. The study also recovered part of the genome of the lichen's algal partner and characterized the wider microbial community living within the lichen using metagenomic sequencing (sequencing all DNA in a sample to identify the organisms present). This analysis identified 31 metagenome-assembled genomes from the lichen-associated microbial community. At the phylum level, the community was dominated by Ascomycota (sac fungi), Pseudomonadota (a major group of bacteria), and Bacteroidota (another bacterial group), while long-read sequencing improved detection of rarer taxa. In the study's comparative genomic analysis, C. uncialis was recovered as sister to C. borealis.

== See also ==
- List of Cladonia species
- List of lichens named by Carl Linnaeus
