= Lichenopeltella uncialicola =

Scientific classification
- Domain: Eukaryota
- Kingdom: Fungi
- Division: Ascomycota
- Class: Dothideomycetes
- Order: Microthyriales
- Family: Microthyriaceae
- Genus: Lichenopeltella
- Species: L. uncialicola

Binomial name
- Lichenopeltella uncialicola Brackel (2010)

Species of fungus

Lichenopeltella uncialicola is a species of fungus belonging to the class Dothideomycetes. The species was discovered and described from specimens collected in Iceland in 2010, where it was found growing on the fruticose lichen species Cladonia uncialis. Since then, it has been found on a different host species, Cladonia rangiferina, in North Korea, Italy, Austria, and Greenland.

== Description ==
Lichenopeltella uncialicola is a lichenicolous fungus (a fungus that grows on lichens) that species grows specifically on the lichen Cladonia uncialis, primarily on the basal parts of the podetia (the upright stalks of the lichen).

The fungus produces small, dark brown to almost black, disc-shaped reproductive structures called catathecia that measure 40–85 μm in diameter and 35–40 μm in height. These catathecia have a distinctive appearance, with an upper layer composed of radially arranged brown cells and a clearly delimited dark brown collar around the ostiole (opening). The ostiole, measuring 6–8 μm wide when mature and wet, is surrounded by a crown of 5–7 divergent setae (hair-like structures) that are 15–20 μm long and 2.5–3 μm wide. These setae are dark brown, thick-walled, smooth, pointed, non-septate (without dividing walls), and either straight or slightly curved.

Inside the catathecia are ovoid to obclavate (inversely club-shaped) asci (spore-containing structures) measuring 22–26 μm by 8–9.5 μm, each containing four ascospores. The ascospores are ellipsoid, hyaline (colourless and transparent), 1-septate (divided by a single wall), and measure approximately 12–14.3 μm by 3–3.4 μm. They lack setulae (small appendages) and contain four oil droplets (described as 4-guttulate). The upper cell of each ascospore is rounded, while the lower cell is very slightly tapered.

The vegetative portion of the fungus consists of pale brown, sparsely branched hyphae measuring 1.5–3 μm wide that grow inside the cortex (outer layer) of the host lichen.

Lichenopeltella uncialicola is distinguished from other species in the genus by its combination of divergent ostiolar setae, four-spored asci, and ascospores that lack appendages.
