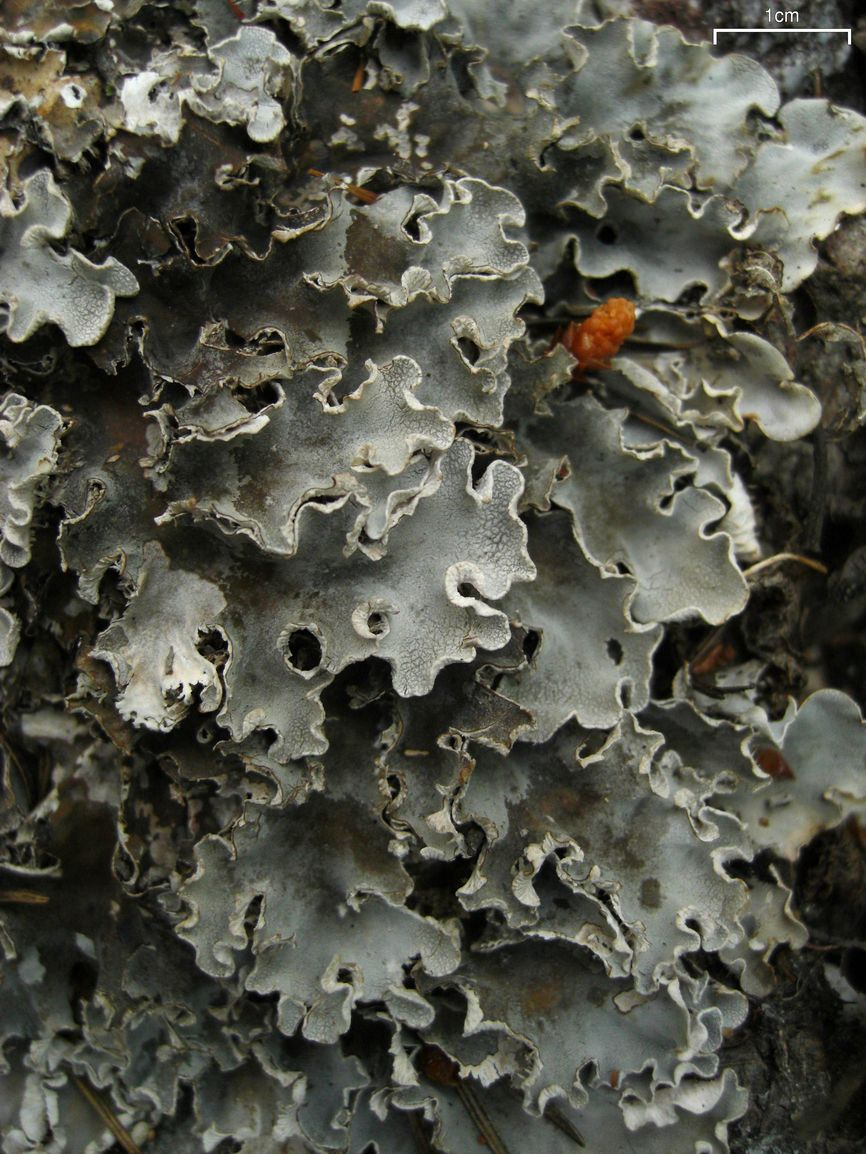

Conservation status
- Secure (NatureServe)

Scientific classification
- Kingdom: Fungi
- Division: Ascomycota
- Class: Lecanoromycetes
- Order: Peltigerales
- Family: Peltigeraceae
- Genus: Peltigera
- Species: P. rufescens

Binomial name
- Peltigera rufescens (Weiss) Humb. (1793)

Synonyms
- List: Lichen caninus var. rufescens Weiss (1770); Lichen rufescens (Weiss) Neck. (1771); Peltidea canina var. rufescens (Weiss) Wahlenb. (1826); Peltidea rufescens (Weiss) Ach. (1803); Peltigera canina subsp. rufescens (Weiss) Lamy (1880); Peltigera canina var. coriacea Kremp. (1861); Peltigera canina var. rufescens (Weiss) Mudd (1861)

= Peltigera rufescens =

Species of lichen-forming fungus

Peltigera rufescens, commonly known as the field dog lichen or field pelt, is a species of terricolous (ground-dwelling), foliose lichen in the family Peltigeraceae. This common and widespread species has a cosmopolitan distribution, often found in dry, sunny habitats on basic soils, limestone, and nutrient-rich silicate substrates. The lichen forms rosettes up to 20 cm (8 in) in diameter, with a grey to brown thallus densely covered with a soft, velvety tomentum. Its lobes, typically 3–5 cm (1.2–2.0 in) long and 5–10 mm (0.2–0.4 in) wide, have distinctively curled upward edges. The underside of the thallus features a network of veins and rhizines, which anchor the lichen to its substrate. P. rufescens reproduces both sexually through apothecia (fruiting bodies) and asexually via regeneration lobes. It forms a symbiotic relationship with cyanobacteria from the genus Nostoc as its photobiont. The species is notable for its ability to bioaccumulate heavy metals and its adaptive responses to ultraviolet-B radiation, making it a subject for ecological and physiological studies.

== Taxonomy ==
The lichen was first formally described as a variety of Lichen caninus in 1770 by Friedrich Wilhelm Weiss. At that time, lichens were classified in the eponymous genus Lichen, based on the influence of Carl Linnaeus and his 1753 work Species Plantarum. Alexander von Humboldt transferred the taxon to the genus Peltigera and promoted it to the status of species in 1793. Later in its taxonomic history, other authors proposed that it be transferred to the now defunct genus Peltidea, or that it best be considered as a variety or subspecies of Peltigera canina. Vernacular names used for the species in North America include "field dog lichen" and "field pelt".

The complete mitochondrial genome sequence of Peltigera rufescens was published in 2021. It has 65,199 base pairs and a cytosine+guanine content of 26.7%. Molecular phylogenetics analysis suggests a close relationship with Peltigera membranacea.

== Description ==
Peltigera rufescens has a grey- to brown-coloured thallus that is often covered with a heavy tomentum (closely matted or fine hairs). It forms rosettes up to 20 cm (8 in) in diameter. The lobes comprising the thallus usually measure 5–10 millimetres (0.2–0.4 in) wide and have edges that are curled upwards. Typically, the lobes are 3–5 cm (1.2–2.0 in) long. Small "regeneration lobes" (0.1–0.3 mm) are often present at the edge of the thallus. The undersurface of the thallus is strongly veined, dark in colour with a paler margin. The veins are raised but usually quite flat, rarely as high as they are wide, and not always clearly defined all the way to the periphery of the thallus. The spaces between veins are light-coloured, often very elongated, and about as wide to twice as wide as the veins (approximately 0.5–1 mm). Rhizines on the underside affix the lichen to its substrate; near the centre they are so dense so as to form an almost continuous mat. In the outer part of the thallus, there are often distinctive long comb-like rows of protruding white hairs (less than 0.5 mm long) on the veins. Fruiting bodies, or apothecia, are common in this species. They are saddle shaped and dark red brown in colour. Isidia and soredia are absent in this species. The ascospores usually have between 3 and 5 septa and measure 40–70 by 3–5 μm. Conidiomata are sometimes produced by the lichen; the conidia are 7–10 by 2.5–4.5 μm. The photobiont partner of Peltigera rufescens is cyanobacteria from the genus Nostoc.

No lichen products are associated with Peltigera rufescens, and consequently, the expected results of standard lichen spot tests are all negative.

If grown in a metal-polluted environment, Peltigera rufescens will have a reduction in thallus size and in rhizine length, as well as denser growth of the rhizines, veins that are more profusely branched, and an increase in volume of the medulla. When treated with mercury, cadmium, or nickel, P. rufescens chlorophyll α and carotenoid concentrations will also decrease. As with other lichens, P. rufescens is a bioaccumulator of heavy metals. This may be due to the thallus having a large surface area in contact with the substrate. P. rufescens also has free amino acid concentrations higher than other lichens in similar polluted habitats, comparable to vascular plants, suggesting that this may play a role in heavy metal tolerance.

=== Reproductive structures ===
In 1971, Marie-Agnès Letrouit-Galinou and R. Lallemant published a study on the thallus, apothecia, and asci of Peltigera rufescens, using histological techniques and microscopic examination. The thallus was described as having a "cladomian" structure, evolving from axial filaments that are lodged in the veins. These filaments give rise to both short ventral pleuridia (lateral branchlets) and well-developed dorsal ramifications. The formation of apothecia is initiated by a limited number of marginal dorsal pleuridia, leading to a primary thallus resembling those in the families Lecanoraceae and Graphidaceae, with a distinct development process marked by a lengthy angiocarpic stage (a phase in the development where the apothecium is initially formed as a closed structure, enclosing the asci and ascospores). The asci were identified as bitunicate and 'archaeasce', signifying a complex reproductive structure. Additionally, the research investigated the cladomian, multi-axial structure of the thallus in detail, comparing it to similar structures in algae and highlighting the differentiation between dorsal and ventral pleuridia, which contribute to the thallus's growth and structure.

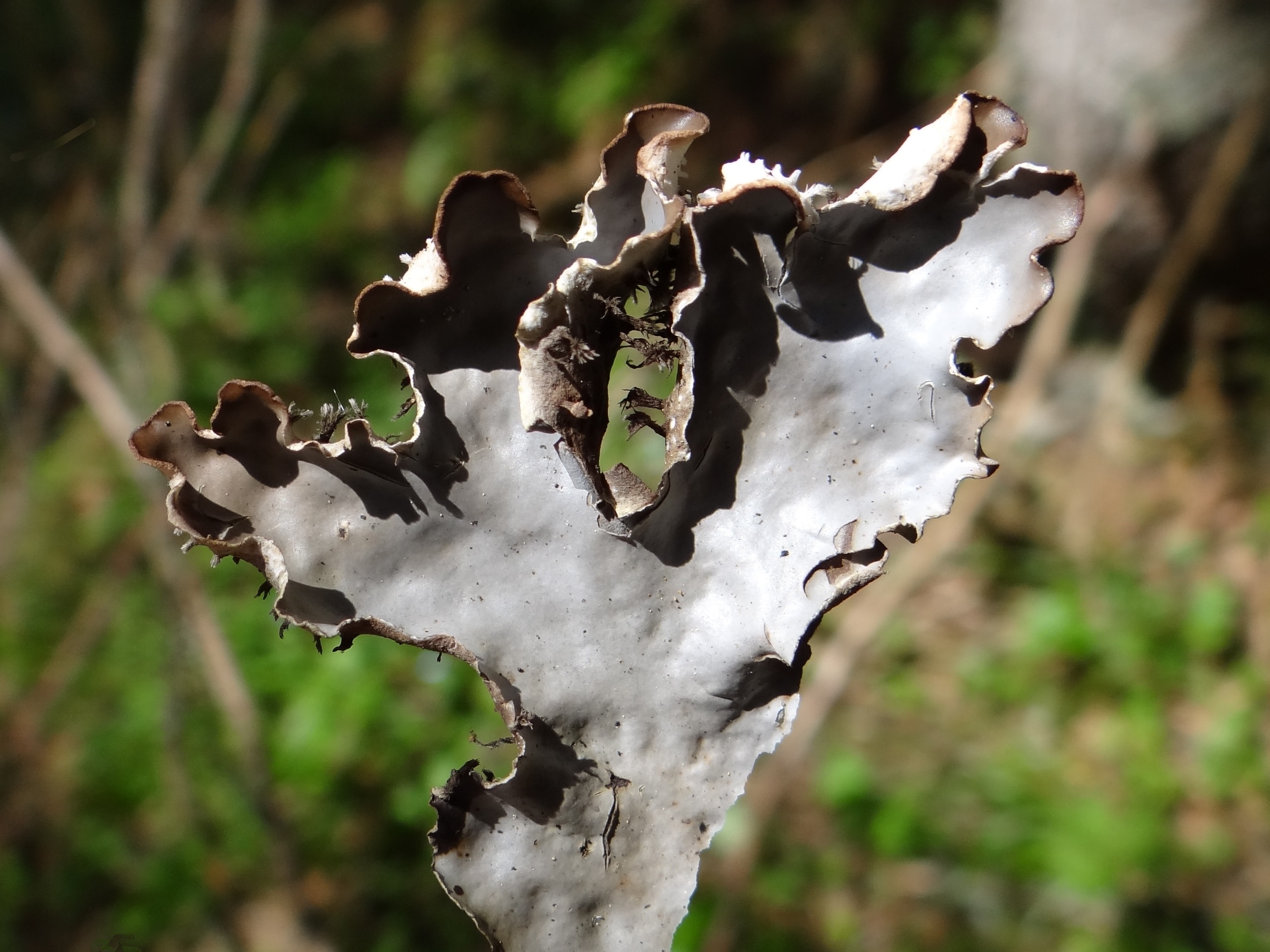
Closeup of lobe surface

== Habitat and distribution ==
Peltigera rufescens is a common and widespread lichen with a cosmopolitan distribution. It is most often encountered in dry, sunny habitats. It prefers more or less basic soils. It also grows on limestone and dolomite (rarely on silicate rocks) as well as nutrient-rich silicate soils, including diverse environments like calcareous grasslands and stone structures. Individuals that grow in association with mosses tend to grow more robustly and have a higher amount of chlorophyll α then those that do not. Not only does the moss provides a buffer against extremes in temperature variation, the moss-associated thalli have higher photosynthetic rates, and increased protection against desiccation. Additionally, their thalli are thicker, leading to enhanced water retention. Mosses that have been recorded associating with Peltigera rufescens include Racomitrium heterostichum, Campylopus introflexus, Hypnum cupressiforme, and Polytrichum juniperinum. A study of the high-elevation biological soil crust associated with the volcanic tephra in Hawaii's Haleakalā Crater found that Peltigera rufescens was one of the two important components of this crust (the other was the moss Grimmia torquata) and occurred in about a quarter of soil specimens sampled.

In Nepal, Peltigera rufescens has been reported at 2,100 m elevation in a compilation of published records.

== Ecology ==
Preussia peltigerae, Dacampia rufescentis, Dinemasporium strigosum, Lichenopenicillus versicolor, Nectriopsis lecanodes, Norrlinia peltigericola, and Scutula didymospora are lichenicolous fungi that use Peltigera rufescens as a host. In the case of Scutula didymospora, the relationship appears to be commensalistic, as the fungus, which develops on the underside of the thallus, does not cause any damage, discolouration or galls.

In one experiment, to test the effect of thallus hydration on metabolic activity, the photosystem II fluorescence of Peltigera rufescens was monitored for a full year. The lichen was inactive for 46.5% of the time, active during daylight for 25.6%, and hydrated at night for 27.9% of the time. Its photosynthetic activity and moisture levels were correlated with environmental conditions, with four distinct activity patterns discerned. Despite previous experimental findings suggesting high light could be harmful when the lichen is hydrated, field observations found little evidence of damage, suggesting an unknown photoprotection mechanism possibly involving certain carotenoids. In a study examining the effects of long-term UV-B radiation on lichen species, Peltigera rufescens, typically found in open meadow spaces, demonstrated increased hydrogen peroxide content and superoxide dismutase activity, indicating a possible adaptive response to oxidative stress caused by UV-B exposure. This lichen species displayed a higher resilience to UV-B compared to Peltigera aphthosa, suggesting a species-specific response to UV-B radiation that likely stems from their typical habitat's light conditions.

=== Microbial communities ===
Peltigera rufescens hosts diverse communities of microorganisms within its thallus structure. Studies have shown it contains particularly rich communities of basidiomycete yeasts, with research from southern Chile documenting 92 different yeast isolates representing 18 distinct taxa – the highest yeast diversity observed among studied Peltigera species. Like other Peltigera lichens, P. rufescens appears able to acquire microorganisms from the soils in which it grows, suggesting that local environments serve as reservoirs for components of its microbiome. The species harbours yeasts from multiple taxonomic groups, including members of the classes Tremellomycetes, Cystobasidiomycetes, and other basidiomycetes. Many of these yeasts show adaptations to cold environments, which may contribute to the lichen's ability to survive in harsh conditions.

This diverse microbial community likely contributes to the lichen's overall ecological function and resilience, though the specific roles of many associated microorganisms remain under investigation. The presence of these microbial communities demonstrates that P. rufescens, like other lichens, functions not just as a symbiotic partnership between fungus and photobiont, but as a complex microscopic ecosystem.

== Bioactivity ==
Laboratory experiments suggest that extracts of Peltigera rufescens have insecticidal activity against the maize weevil (Sitophilus zeamais).
