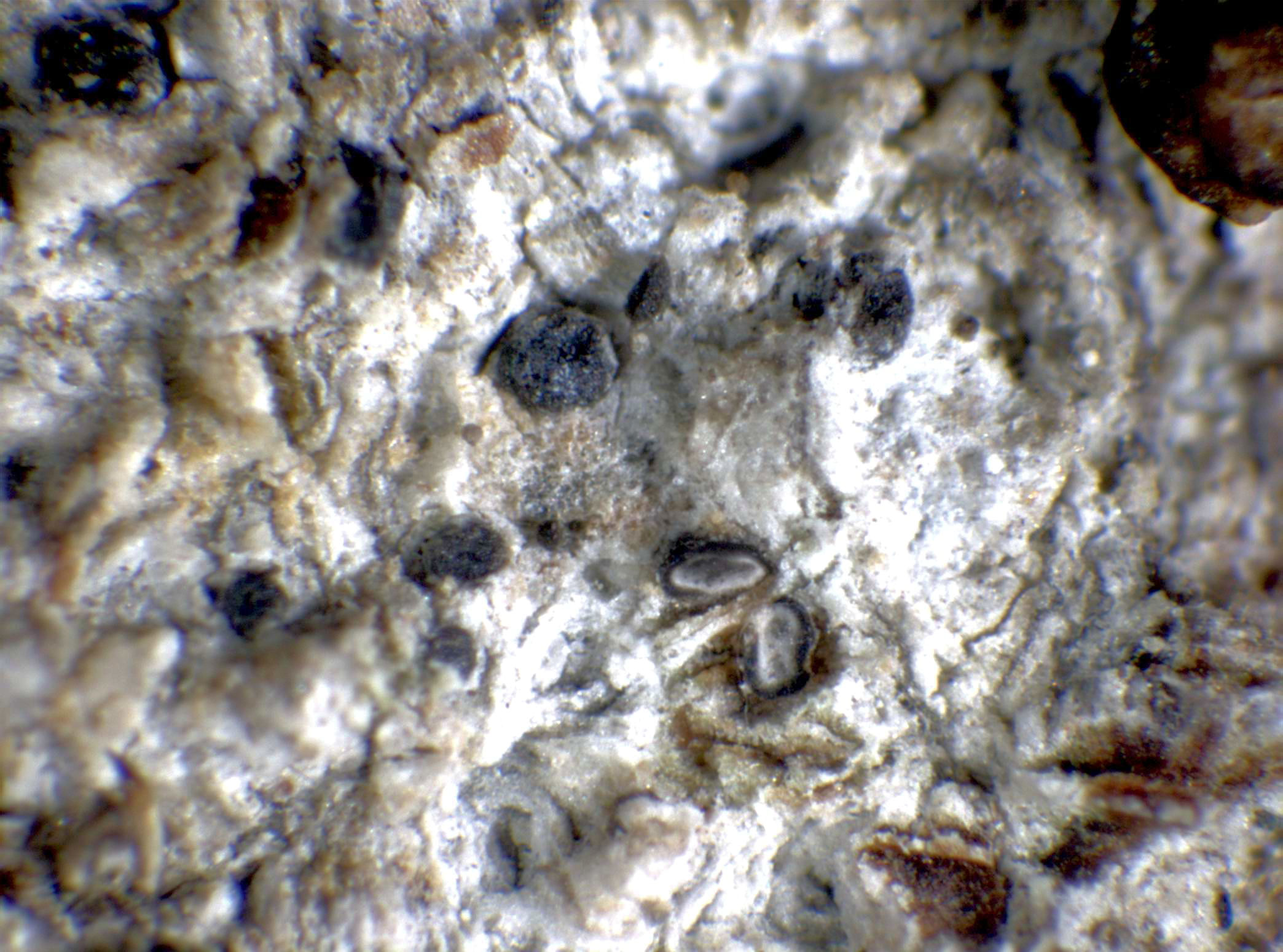
- Eopyrenula leucoplaca

Scientific classification
- Kingdom: Fungi
- Division: Ascomycota
- Class: Dothideomycetes
- Order: Pleosporales
- Family: Dacampiaceae
- Genus: Eopyrenula; R.C.Harris (1973)

Type species
- Eopyrenula leucoplaca (Wallr.) R.C.Harris (1973)

Species
- E. avellanae E. grandicula E. intermedia E. leucoplaca E. parvispora E. septemseptata

= Eopyrenula =

Genus of lichens

Eopyrenula is a genus of lichen-forming fungi in the family Dacampiaceae. It comprises six species. The genus was established in 1973 by Richard C. Harris to separate these lichens from the related genus Pyrenula, based on differences in their reproductive structures and spore characteristics. Eopyrenula species are found on tree bark in temperate regions, particularly in Europe and North America, where they form thin, pale grey crusts dotted with tiny dark fruiting bodies. The genus occupies an uncertain position in fungal classification, with its family placement remaining provisional pending molecular analysis. These inconspicuous lichens can be identified by their brown, multi-segmented ascospores and their association with the green alga Trentepohlia.

== Taxonomy ==
Eopyrenula was erected by Richard C. Harris (1973) as a new genus in the Pyrenulaceae to accommodate material long kept in Pyrenula, with the type species designated as Eopyrenula leucoplaca (based on Wallroth's Verrucaria leucoplaca of 1831). Harris separated the genus on structural grounds: unlike Pyrenula, Eopyrenula lacks a well-developed pseudostromatic involucrellum (the outer "shell" of the perithecium), its spores do not develop a thick endospore, and its pycnidia produce brown, transversely septate macroconidia (while still having the filiform, colourless microconidia seen in Pyrenula). He noted that these features make Eopyrenula morphologically intermediate between Pyrenula and the lichen-forming members of Arthopyrenia; superficially similar Blastodesmia was excluded because it lacks algae and differs in ascocarp and conidial characters.

Within the genus, Harris treated a single species, E. leucoplaca. Earlier authors had conflated this taxon with Verrucaria farrea (Pyrenula farrea), but Edvard Vainio examined the type of V. farrea and concluded it was different, supporting the retention of leucoplaca as a distinct species under Eopyrenula. Harris also clarified that Bruce Fink's North American variety Pyrenula leucoplaca var. pluriloculata—proposed because some material showed more than three septa—was unnecessary, as European material is consistently 5–6-septate and North American material with 5–6 septa belongs here. He further showed that many North American specimens labeled "Pyrenula leucoplaca" or "P. farrea" actually represent a non-lichenised, Melanomma-like fungus confined to living bark of trembling aspen; that element can be told by its lack of iodine reaction and consistently 3-septate spores with a thick gelatinous sheath.

Eopyrenula is presently treated in the family Dacampiaceae, but its placement is unsettled. Some authors have instead kept it as Pezizomycotina incertae sedis (uncertain placement), a view followed in the "Revisions of British and Irish Lichens" treatment in 2023. Morphologically it also shows clear affinities to Pyrenulaceae (Eurotiomycetes); given these conflicts, most authors regard its family-level position as provisional pending sequencing.

== Description ==
Eopyrenula is a genus of bark-dwelling, lichen-forming fungi characterised by small, dark perithecioid (flask-shaped) fruiting bodies that are typically only partly immersed in the bark. The surface layer of the lichen (the thallus) is thin, smooth, and whitish to pale grey, and contains the green alga Trentepohlia, which forms short chains of well-developed cells. Each fruiting body (ascocarp) is rounded or slightly depressed in the centre, typically small (to about 0.3 mm across), with a dark brown wall that is thicker at the top and paler below. Unlike related genera such as Pyrenula, Eopyrenula lacks a well-formed involucrellum—a distinct outer wall layer that encloses the perithecia—and it does not develop the thick internal endospore layer typical of that genus. The asci (spore-bearing sacs), are cylindrical and contain eight spores arranged in a single slanted row. When stained with iodine, the hymenium (the spore-producing tissue) turns blue-green before shifting to orange, a reaction that helps identify this genus microscopically.

The ascospores are brown, spindle-shaped, and divided by five or six cross-walls (septa). The cells near the middle of each spore are the largest, tapering in size toward both ends. The outer layer of each spore lacks a gelatinous coating, and the internal cavities are arranged symmetrically along the long axis.

Microscopically and anatomically, Eopyrenula bridges certain features of Pyrenula and lichenised species of Arthopyrenia: it shares the brown, multi-septate spores of the latter but retains the overall perithecial structure of Pyrenula. The pycnidia (asexual reproductive structures) produce two types of conidia—filiform, colourless microconidia and larger, brown, transversely divided macroconidia—another feature that sets it apart from other members of the Pyrenulaceae.

== Species ==
As of November 2025, Species Fungorum (in the Catalogue of Life) accepts six species of Eopyrenula. Distributions are from André Aptroot's 2012 publication "world key to the species of Anthracothecium and Pyrenula".

- Eopyrenula avellanae Coppins (1992) – western Europe
- Eopyrenula grandicula Coppins (1992) – western Europe
- Eopyrenula intermedia Coppins (1991) – New World, temperate
- Eopyrenula leucoplaca (Wallr.) R.C.Harris (1973) – Old World, temperate
- Eopyrenula parvispora R.C.Harris & Aptroot (1991) – New World, temperate
- Eopyrenula septemseptata Coppins (1992) – western Europe
