= Dacampia =

Scientific classification
- Kingdom: Fungi
- Division: Ascomycota
- Class: Dothideomycetes
- Order: Pleosporales
- Family: Dacampiaceae
- Genus: Dacampia; A.Massal. (1853)

Type species
- Dacampia hookeri (Borrer) A.Massal. (1853)

Genus of fungi

Dacampia is a genus of fungi in the family Dacampiaceae. It contains 15 species. The genus was circumscribed in 1853 by Italian lichenologist Abramo Bartolommeo Massalongo, with Dacampia hookeri assigned as the type species. The genus name honours Italian naturalist Benedetto de Dacampo (1787–1851).

== Species ==
- Dacampia caloplacicola Halıcı, Candan & Etayo (2009)
- Dacampia cladoniicola Halıcı & A.Ö.Türk (2008)
- Dacampia cyrtellae Brackel (2010)
- Dacampia hookeri (Borrer) A.Massal. (1853)
- Dacampia lecaniae Kocourk. & K.Knudsen (2010)
- Dacampia leptogiicola (D.Hawksw.) D.Hawksw. (2008)
- Dacampia muralicola Halıcı & D.Hawksw. (2008)
- Dacampia neglecta Stein (1872)
- Dacampia peltigericola D.Hawksw. & C.J.B.Hitch (2006)
- Dacampia pentaseptata Etayo (2017)
- Dacampia rhizocarpicola D.Hawksw. (2008)
- Dacampia rubra Halıcı, Candan & Calat. (2009)
- Dacampia rufescentis (Vouaux) D.Hawksw. (1986)
- Dacampia xanthomendozae Etayo & Halıcı (2009)
