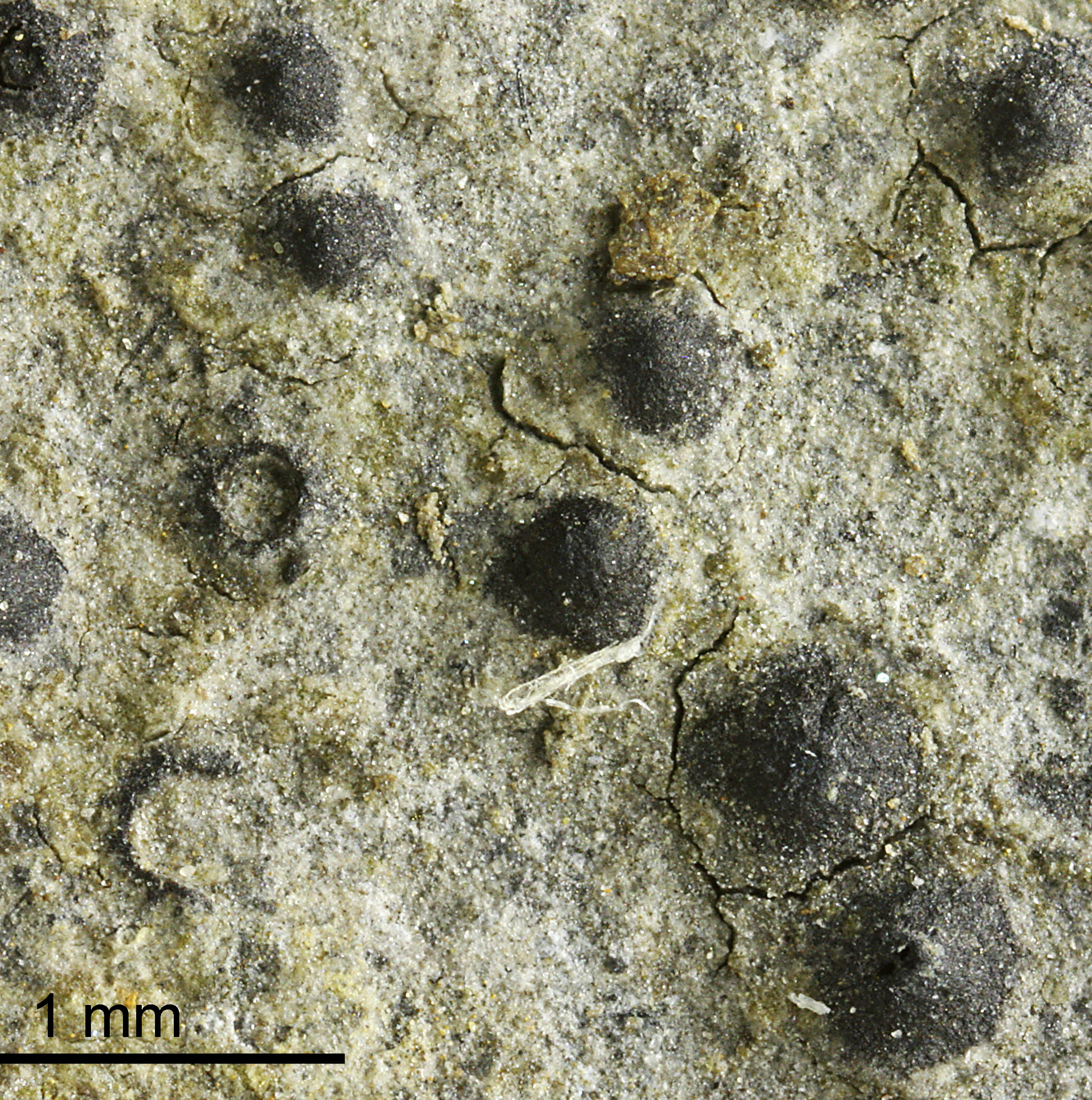
- Closeup of thallus and perithecia; scale bar = 1 mm

Conservation status
- Secure (NatureServe)

Scientific classification
- Domain: Eukaryota
- Kingdom: Fungi
- Division: Ascomycota
- Class: Eurotiomycetes
- Order: Verrucariales
- Family: Verrucariaceae
- Genus: Verrucaria
- Species: V. muralis

Binomial name
- Verrucaria muralis Ach. (1803)

Synonyms
- List: Thelotrema murale (Ach.) Hepp (1857); Verrucaria muralis f. submuralis (Nyl.) Vain. (1883); Verrucaria muralis var. submuralis (Nyl.) H.Olivier (1903); Verrucaria rupestris var. submuralis (Nyl.) Zahlbr. (1921); Verrucaria submuralis Nyl. (1875)

= Verrucaria muralis =

Species of lichen

Verrucaria muralis is a species of saxicolous (rock-dwelling, crustose lichen in the family Verrucariaceae. It is a common species with an almost cosmopolitan distribution, occurring in an altitudinal range extending from the lowlands to the subalpine zone. It grows on calcareous rocks and walls. It was first formally described as a new species in 1803 by Swedish lichenologist Erik Acharius.

== Description ==
The epilithic thallus of Verrucaria muralis is thin (0.02–0.2 mm thick,) and greyish. It has medium-sized hemispherically protruding perithecia, more or less spherical pale exciples with a well-developed involucrellum of medium thickness that usually reaches down to the middle part of the perithecium (rarely deeper). The hymenium has sparsely branched-anastomosing paraphyses of about 30–50 μm in length, and spores measuring 18–25 by 8–13 μm.

In a study of lichen growth rate, Bruce Fink reported in 1917 that it increased in diameter 0.6 cm in 1 year.

Verrucaria marinomuralis is a superficially similar species occurring on non-calcareous seaside rocks in the splash zone or above in central Japan and in Europe. Besides their different ecology, only minor morphological differences separate the two species. Another similar species, Verrucaria epilithea, differs from V. muralis by having a pale, rather than dark, exciple.

== Species interactions ==
Lichenopeltella coppinsii is a lichenicolous fungus that grows on V. muralis. Opegrapha hochstetteri is another lichenicolous fungus that grows on the lichen; its presence causes little damage to its host.

== Habitat and distribution ==
The lichen is widely distributed in Fennoscandia and Baltic countries. It was reported for the first time in Korea in 2009.

== See also ==
- List of Verrucaria species
