= Lichenopeltella cladoniarum =

Scientific classification
- Kingdom: Fungi
- Division: Ascomycota
- Class: Dothideomycetes
- Order: Microthyriales
- Family: Microthyriaceae
- Genus: Lichenopeltella
- Species: L. cladoniarum

Binomial name
- Lichenopeltella cladoniarum E.S.Hansen & Alstrup (1995)

Species of fungus

Lichenopeltella cladoniarum is a species of fungus belonging to the class Dothideomycetes. It has been found growing on the podetia of Cladonia arbuscula in Iceland, Bulgan district, Mongolia and Yamanashi prefecture in Japan. It has also been found growing on Cladonia portentosa in Iceland.
