= Lichenopeltella cetrariicola =

Scientific classification
- Domain: Eukaryota
- Kingdom: Fungi
- Division: Ascomycota
- Class: Dothideomycetes
- Order: Microthyriales
- Family: Microthyriaceae
- Genus: Lichenopeltella
- Species: L. cetrariicola

Binomial name
- Lichenopeltella cetrariicola (Nyl.) R.Sant. (1989)

Synonyms
- Psilosphaeria cetrariicola Cooke (1879); Phragmothyrium cetrariicola (Nyl.) Keissl. (1930); Trichothyrina cetrariicola (Nyl.) D.Hawksw. (1980); Micropeltopsis cetrariicola (Nyl.) Vain. (1921); Metasphaeria cetrariicola (Cooke) Sacc. (1883); Sphaerulina cetrariicola (Cooke) P.Karst. (1885); Sphaeria cetrariicola Nyl. ex Cooke (1874); Sphaeria cetrariicola Nyl. (1873)

Species of fungus

Lichenopeltella cetrariicola is a species of lichenicolous fungus belonging to the class Dothideomycetes. It has been reported from Europe and Iceland but it probably has a more widespread distribution. It has been reported from at least two host species, Cetraria islandica and Cetraria aculeata.
