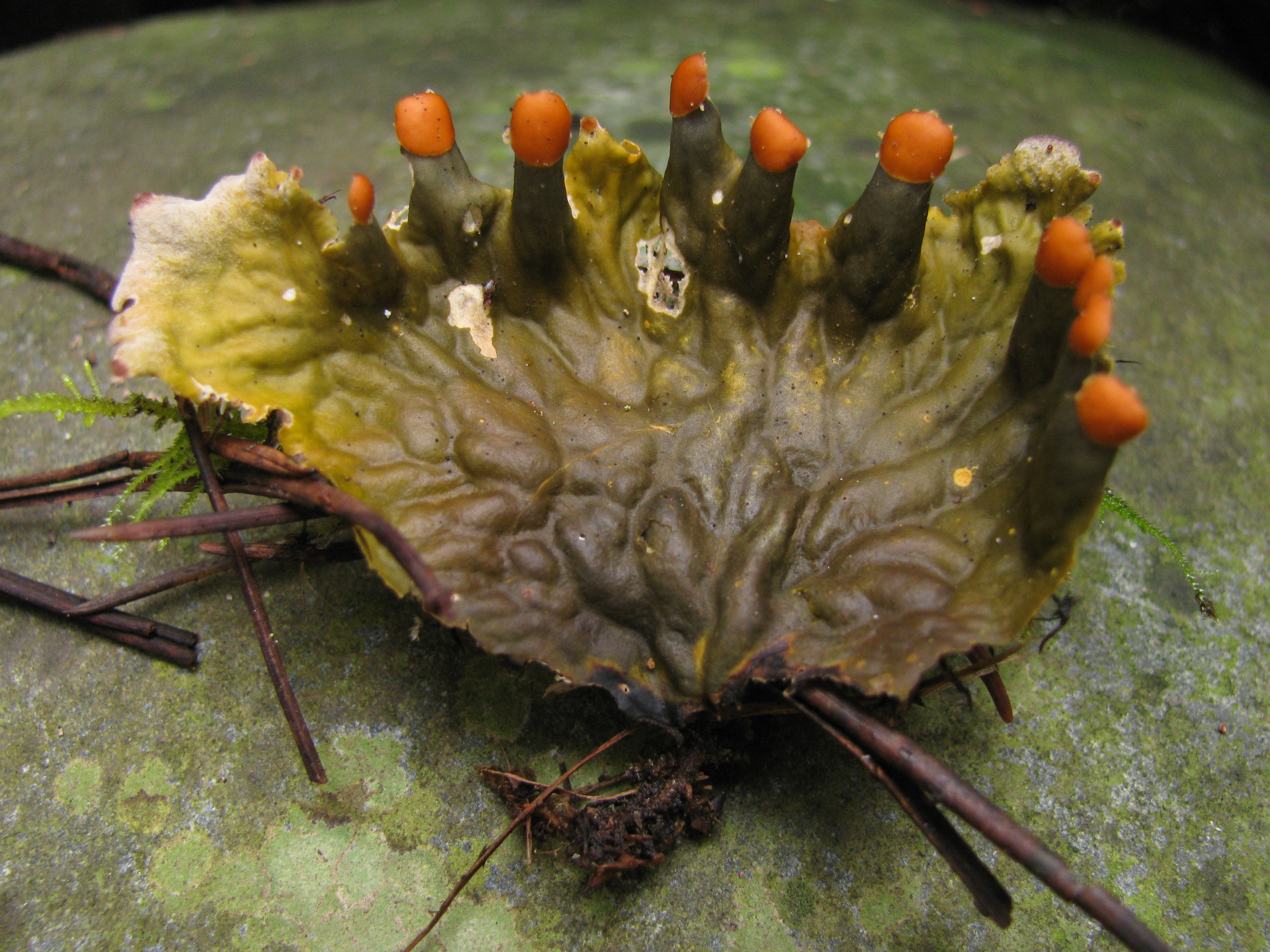

Conservation status
- Secure (NatureServe)

Scientific classification
- Kingdom: Fungi
- Division: Ascomycota
- Class: Lecanoromycetes
- Order: Peltigerales
- Family: Peltigeraceae
- Genus: Peltigera
- Species: P. membranacea

Binomial name
- Peltigera membranacea (Ach.) Nyl. (1887)

Synonyms
- Peltidea canina var. membranacea Ach. (1810); Peltigera canina var. membranacea (Ach.) Duby (1830); Peltigera canina f. membranacea (Ach.) Duby (1830); Peltigera canina subsp. membranacea (Ach.) Herre (1910)

= Peltigera membranacea =

Species of lichen-forming fungus

Peltigera membranacea is a species of lichenized fungus in the family Peltigeraceae. It has a foliose growth pattern, with what appear to be veins in the leaf-like parts, but these do not have a vascular function. The apothecia are erect, numerous, and often a bright brown-orange in colour. Some simple sequence repeat markers have been developed for both the fungal partner (mycobiont) of Peltigera membranacea and its Nostoc photobiont partner; these allow for both population genetic studies and an alternative means of identifying between P. membranacea and its lookalikes.

In Nepal, Peltigera membranacea has been reported from 1,900 to 2,400 m elevation in a compilation of published records.

Peltigera membranacea is a known host to the lichenicolous fungus species Lichenopeltella peltigericola.
