= Lichenopeltella peltigericola =

Scientific classification
- Kingdom: Fungi
- Division: Ascomycota
- Class: Dothideomycetes
- Order: Microthyriales
- Family: Microthyriaceae
- Genus: Lichenopeltella
- Species: L. peltigericola

Binomial name
- Lichenopeltella peltigericola (D. Hawksw.) R. Sant. (1993)

Synonyms
- Actinopeltis peltigericola D.Hawksw. (1982); Micropeltopsis peltigericola (D.Hawksw.) P.M.Kirk & Spooner (1990)

Species of fungus

Lichenopeltella peltigericola is a species of lichenicolous fungus in the family Microthyriaceae. It is common in Finland and has also been reported from Norway and Sweden.

A known host species to Lichenopeltella peltigericola is Peltigera membranacea.
