= Mercusic acid =

Names
- IUPAC name (1S,4aR,5S,8aR)-5-[(3S)-4-carboxy-3-methylbutyl]-1,4a-dimethyl-6-methylidene-3,4,5,7,8,8a-hexahydro-2H-naphthalene-1-carboxylic acid
- Other names: Junicedric acid; 13S-Dihydroagathic acid

Identifiers
| CAS Number | 41787-69-3 |
| 3D model (JSmol) | Interactive image |
| ChEMBL | ChEMBL3781270 |
| ChemSpider | 33823993 |
| PubChem CID | 38347252 |
| CompTox Dashboard (EPA) | DTXSID70904203 |
- InChI: InChI=1S/C20H32O4/c1-13(12-17(21)22)6-8-15-14(2)7-9-16-19(15,3)10-5-11-20(16,4)18(23)24/h13,15-16H,2,5-12H2,1,3-4H3,(H,21,22)(H,23,24)/t13-,15-,16+,19+,20-/m0/s1 Key: HPQKNJHVWUWAOR-BWCMQUJESA-N
- SMILES: C[C@@H](CC[C@H]1C(=C)CC[C@@H]2[C@]1(C)CCC[C@]2(C)C(=O)O)CC(=O)O

Properties
| Chemical formula | C_{20}H_{32}O_{4} |
| Molar mass | 336.472 g·mol^{−1} |
| Density | 1.09 g/cm^{3} |
| Melting point | 122–128 °C (252–262 °F; 395–401 K) |
| Solubility in water | Practically insoluble |
- Except where otherwise noted, data are given for materials in their standard state (at 25 °C [77 °F], 100 kPa). Infobox references

Mercusic acid is a naturally occurring organic compound classified as a diterpenoid with the molecular formula C_{20}H_{32}O_{4}. The acid features a labdane skeleton with exocyclic double bond at C8(17) and carboxylic groups at C15 and C19.

== Natural occurrence ==
Mercusic acid was obtained from rosin of Pinus merkusii, a conifer native to Southeast Asia, hence the name. The acid is also found in such taxons as Brickellia glomerata, Cryptomeria japonica, Dicranopteris linearis, Juniperus formosana, Pinus yunnanensis, Cupressus sempervirens, among others.

Pine resin acids generally deter pests and pathogens. As part of oleoresin, mercusic acid acts as a chemical defense against herbivores, fungi, and bacteria via antimicrobial and antioxidative properties.

== Uses ==
Natural resin acids present in rosin of Pinus species, including isopimaric acid, mercusic acid, neoabietic acid, dehydroabietic acid, and podocarpic acid, have been studied for their possible inhibitory effects on Epstein–Barr virus. The acid is also known for its cancer chemopreventive activity.
