= Dacampiaceae =

Scientific classification
- Kingdom: Fungi
- Division: Ascomycota
- Class: Dothideomycetes
- Order: Pleosporales
- Family: Dacampiaceae; Körb. (1855)

Type genus
- Dacampia A.Massal. (1853)

Family of fungi

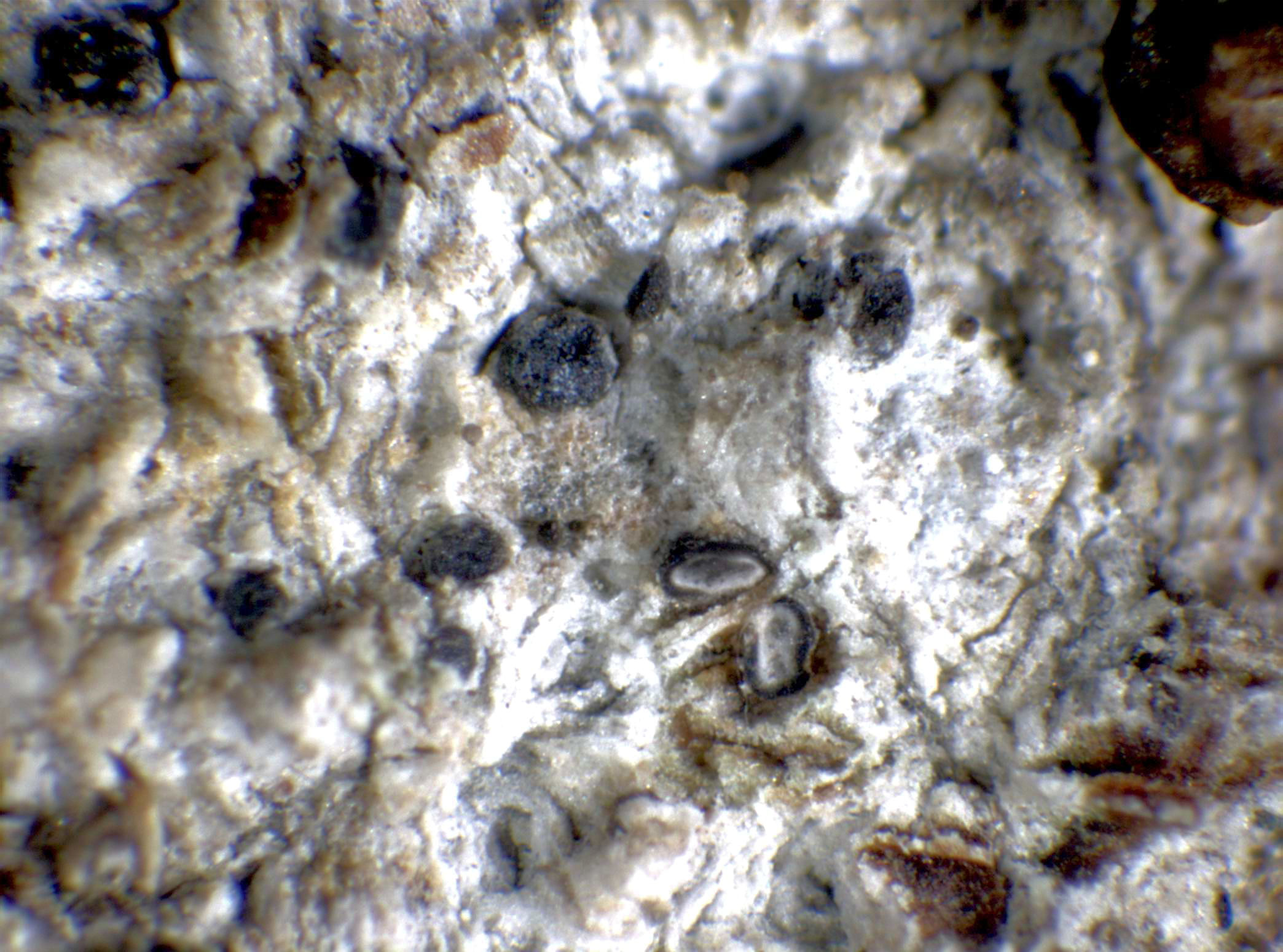
The bark-dwelling lichen, Eopyrenula leucoplaca

Dacampiaceae is a family of fungi belonging to the order Pleosporales. The family was circumscribed in 1855 by the German lichenologist Gustav Wilhelm Körber.

== Genera ==
- Aaosphaeria Aptroot (1995) – 2 spp.
- Dacampia A.Massal. (1853) – 14 spp.
- Eopyrenula R.C.Harris (1973) – 6 spp.
- Leptocucurthis Aptroot (1998) – 1 sp.
- Weddellomyces D.Hawksw. (1986) – 12 spp.
- Xenosphaeria Trevis. (1860) – 1 sp.
