= Fissurina astroisidiata =

Scientific classification
- Kingdom: Fungi
- Division: Ascomycota
- Class: Lecanoromycetes
- Order: Graphidales
- Family: Graphidaceae
- Genus: Fissurina
- Species: F. astroisidiata

Binomial name
- Fissurina astroisidiata Herrera-Campos & Lücking (2011)

Species of lichen

Fissurina astroisidiata is a species of lichen in the family Graphidaceae. Found in Veracruz, Mexico, it was described as new to science in 2011. This lichen was the first member of its genus discovered to produce cylindrical vegetative propagules called isidia, which help it spread vegetatively without sexual reproduction. It forms pale greyish-green crusts on tree bark in shaded rainforest and produces distinctive star-shaped reproductive structures.

== Taxonomy ==
Fissurina astroisidiata was described in 2011 by María Herrera-Campos and Robert Lücking from material collected on the upper slopes of San Martin Tuxtla volcano in the Los Tuxtlas Biosphere Reserve, Veracruz, Mexico. The specific epithet combines the Latin astrum ('star') with isidiatus ('bearing isidia'), alluding to the lichen's star-shaped (stellate) lirellae and its coarse, cylindrical isidia—the first time true isidia have been recorded in the genus. A second isidiate species has since been discovered and described from China, Fissurina isidiata. Molecular data place F. astroisidiata at the base of Fissurina (in the strict sense, or sensu stricto), close to F. dumastii and F. crassilabra. Morphologically it most closely resembles F. incrustans and F. karnatakensis, which share gaping lirellae with thin, pale labia, but both lack isidia and differ in ascospore size or chemistry.

== Description ==
The lichen forms a pale gray-green to olive-green crust up to 10 cm across and 100–150 micrometres (μm) thick (occasionally up to 300 μm where the surface is strongly blistered). The thallus is cracked and noticeably bumpy; each bump often carries a tuft of stout, tapering isidia 1–2 mm long that darken at the tip as they age. In cross-section the thallus has a thin, cartilaginous cortex over an irregular algal layer peppered with clusters of calcium oxalate crystals.

Reproductive structures are distinctive. The lirellae—elongate slits containing the asci—radiate from a central point on each bump, producing a star-like pattern 1–3 mm long. A complete thalline rim surrounds each lirella, while the disk is partly exposed and the thin lips (labia) are yellow-white. Internally the exciple is colorless to orange-brown, 15–25 μm thick; the hymenium stands 90–100 μm high and is clear, capped by a finely granular gray-brown epithecium. Each clavate (club-shaped) ascus contains eight ellipsoid spores that are somewhat muriform (three transverse septa plus zero or one longitudinal septum per segment) and measure 12–15 × 6–8 μm, roughly twice as long as wide. No secondary metabolites (lichen products) have been detected by thin-layer chromatography.

== Habitat and distribution ==
Fissurina astroisidiata is known only from the type locality in the Los Tuxtlas Biosphere Reserve, the northernmost extension of Neotropical rainforest. It grows on the bark of mature trees in the shaded understory at 1,000–1,100 m (3,300–3,600 ft) elevation. Because members of Fissurina typically favor long-standing, undisturbed forest, the species is considered a useful indicator of ecological continuity and forest health.
