= Fissurina varieseptata =

Scientific classification
- Kingdom: Fungi
- Division: Ascomycota
- Class: Lecanoromycetes
- Order: Graphidales
- Family: Graphidaceae
- Genus: Fissurina
- Species: F. varieseptata

Binomial name
- Fissurina varieseptata Common & Lücking (2011)

Species of lichen-forming fungus

Fissurina varieseptata is a species of crustose lichen in the family Graphidaceae. It is known from Florida. It has small, fissure-like lirellae (slit-like fruiting structures) and ascospores that usually have 5–7 transverse septa (internal walls), rather than the more typical three in closely similar species.

== Taxonomy ==
Fissurina varieseptata was described as a new species in 2011 by Ralph Common and Robert Lücking. The holotype (the single specimen designated as the name-bearing type; Common 7413A) was collected in April 1997 in Fakahatchee Strand Preserve State Park (Collier County, Florida), at Big Cypress Bend in an old-growth cypress swamp. It is deposited in the herbarium of the Michigan State University Museum (MSC).

The specific epithet refers to the variable number of transverse septa in the ascospores. The species is superficially similar to Fissurina illiterata and may be closely related, but it can be separated by its much more strongly septate spores, a feature unusual in the genus.

== Description ==
The thallus forms a continuous crust on bark, 1–5 cm across and about 40–70 μm (micrometres) thick. The surface is smooth to uneven and typically yellowish white. The photobiont (the photosynthetic partner) is a trentepohlioid alga (Trentepohlia-type). In cross-section, the upper cortex is irregular and loosely developed, with an irregular algal layer and clusters of crystals.

Individual lirellae are about 0.5–1 mm long and about 0.1 mm wide and high, with a complete thalline margin. The disk is mostly concealed, and the labia are inconspicuous; the thalline margin is yellowish white but becomes yellow-brown along the slit. Microscopically, the asci are fusiform and produce eight ellipsoid ascospores. The spores are usually (3–)5–7-septate (divided by internal walls), 12–18 × 4–5 μm, and non-amyloid (I–). No lichen substances were detected by thin-layer chromatography.

== Habitat and distribution ==
The species was originally known only from the type collection from Fakahatchee Strand Preserve State Park in southwestern Florida, where it was recorded growing on hardwood in an old-growth cypress swamp at Big Cypress Bend. It was later documented on arborescent runner oak (Quercus pumila) in Miami-Dade County.
