= Fissurina duplomarginata =

Scientific classification
- Domain: Eukaryota
- Kingdom: Fungi
- Division: Ascomycota
- Class: Lecanoromycetes
- Order: Graphidales
- Family: Graphidaceae
- Genus: Fissurina
- Species: F. duplomarginata

Binomial name
- Fissurina duplomarginata Weerakoon & Lücking (2015)

Species of lichen

Fissurina duplomarginata is a species of corticolous (bark-dwelling) lichen in the family Graphidaceae. Found in Singapore, it was formally described as a new species in 2015 by Gothamie Weerakoon and Robert Lücking. The type specimen was collected by the first author from a low-elevation primary forest in the Bukit Timah Nature Reserve. It is only known to occur at the type locality. The greenish-grey thallus of the lichen is 25–75 μm thick, and covers an area of up to 5 cm (2 in) in diameter. It lacks a prothallus, soredia, and isidia. The photobiont partner is a member of the green algal genus Trentepohlia with yellowish-green cells measuring 8–14 by 6–9 μm; they occur in the lichen as a layer that is 20–60 μm thick. The species epithet refers to the double margin of the lirellae.
