= Fissurina longiramea =

Scientific classification
- Kingdom: Fungi
- Division: Ascomycota
- Class: Lecanoromycetes
- Order: Graphidales
- Family: Graphidaceae
- Genus: Fissurina
- Species: F. longiramea

Binomial name
- Fissurina longiramea Makhija & Adaw. (2007)

Species of lichen

Fissurina longiramea is a species of corticolous (bark-dwelling) script lichen in the family Graphidaceae. It is found in various locations across India, including the Andaman Islands, Karnataka, and the Nicobar Islands, where it grows in tropical rainforests. The lichen was formally described as a new species in 2007 by Urmila Makhija and Bharati Adawadkar.

The thallus of Fissurina longiramea appears pale brown or greenish-yellow. Its surface is rough, slightly glossy, thick, and cracked, with a thin, black hypothallus delineating its borders. The ascomata are lirelline in form, measuring 8–13 mm in length and bearing a colour similar to the thallus. They are scattered, flexuose, and can be immersed to slightly raised, with either acute or obtuse ends. The disc is narrow, slit-like, dark brown, and pruinose. The exciple is present below, non-striate, broad at the apex, flattened at the basal region, and non-carbonized. It is orange-yellow to brownish, turning dark orange-red when wet. The exciple is convergent and covered by a thalline exciple featuring a distinct, yellowish corticiform layer extending up to the top.

The hymenium is hyaline, 142–155 μm high, and may contain crystals. The hypothecium is indistinct, thin, and varies in colour from hyaline to pale yellowish. Paraphyses are long, thick, unbranched, and warty at the tips. Periphysoids range from short to moderately long and have warty tips. Asci contain eight spores, and have dimensions of 95–110 by 10–12 μm. The ascospores consistently have 3 transverse septa, are ellipsoidal, and typically measure 8–16 by 3–4 μm, with a 1–2 μm-thick halo.

Fissurina longiramea does not react to any of the standard chemical spot tests, and does not appear to contain lichen products. In terms of ascomatal structure, the species resembles Fissurina dumastii and F. subnitidula, but is distinguished by its larger lirellae (8–13 mm long). Other species with trans-septate ascospores, such as Fissurina columbina, F. quadrispora, and F. dumastioides, produce various lichen substances and have much larger ascospores. Meanwhile, F. glauca, an Australian species, has smaller ascomata, measuring 1–3 mm in length.
