= Fissurina coarctata =

Scientific classification
- Kingdom: Fungi
- Division: Ascomycota
- Class: Lecanoromycetes
- Order: Graphidales
- Family: Graphidaceae
- Genus: Fissurina
- Species: F. coarctata

Binomial name
- Fissurina coarctata Makhija & Adaw. (2007)

Species of lichen

Fissurina coarctata is a species of script lichen in the family Graphidaceae. It is found in India, where it grows in tropical rainforests and moist deciduous forests. This corticolous (bark-dwelling) lichen is primarily found on exposed tree trunks along roadsides. Its thallus has a yellowish-brown to olive-green colour and has a thick, verrucose texture. The species was formally described as new to science in 2007 by Urmila Makhija and Bharati Adawadkar.

== Description ==
The ascomata, or fruiting bodies, are in the form of short lirellae, reaching up to 1 mm in length, although they can occasionally grow up to 2 mm. They are simple, unbranched, straight, and either immersed or slightly raised. The ascomata are pale brown or the same colour as the thallus and have obtuse to acute ends. The disc is very narrow, sunken, and usually not visible, but when visible, it is brown.

The exciple is thick and indistinct at the base but converges at the apical portion and broadens at the base. It is non-striate, non-carbonized, and covered by a thalline margin up to the top, with a distinct prosoplectenchymatous corticiform layer adorned with crystals. The hymenium, a fertile layer containing the spore-bearing asci, is hyaline and 60–80 μm high. The hypothecium is indistinct. Paraphyses are simple, unbranched, thin, septate, and sparsely branched, with short spiny tips. Periphysoids are short and indistinct. The asci are 8-spored, measuring 60–75 by 8–10 μm. Ascospores are hyaline, oval, always contains 3 transverse septa, and measure 14–18 by 6–8 μm in size, with a thin halo.

Fissurina coarctata does not contain any lichen substances, and it tests negative for all of the standard chemical spot tests. Fissurina coarctata shares similarities with Fissurina subnitidula and Fissurina dumastii in terms of its ascomatal structure and external morphology. However, Fissurina coarctata differs from these species due to its larger ascospores, very short and densely crowded lirellae, and the absence of unidentified substances in its thallus.
