= Fissurina sipmanii =

Scientific classification
- Kingdom: Fungi
- Division: Ascomycota
- Class: Lecanoromycetes
- Order: Graphidales
- Family: Graphidaceae
- Genus: Fissurina
- Species: F. sipmanii

Binomial name
- Fissurina sipmanii Lücking, B.Moncada & Álvaro (2023)
- Type locality: Araracuara, Colombia

Species of lichen-forming fungus

Fissurina sipmanii is a species of lichen-forming fungus in the family Graphidaceae. It is an olive-green, shiny, bark-dwelling lichen with short, rounded to slightly elongated fruiting bodies whose margins break into irregular lobes with a reddish tinge. The species was described in 2023 from lowland forest in the Colombian Amazon and is named in honour of the lichenologist Harrie Sipman.

== Taxonomy ==
Fissurina sipmanii was described as a new species in 2023 by Robert Lücking, Bibiana Moncada, and Wilson Ricardo Álvaro-Alba in a checklist of lichens from the Colombian Amazon. In that work, it was distinguished from Fissurina amazonica by its shorter and broader, slightly gaping fruiting bodies (ascomata) and by having amyloid ascospores. The species epithet sipmanii was chosen to honour Harrie Sipman, who collected the type material in 1988.

== Description ==
The thallus grows on bark and forms a crust up to 5 cm (2 in) across. It is described as olive-green and shiny, with an uneven surface. A prothallus is absent or may appear as a thin, irregular black line where it meets other lichens. In section, the thallus is 50–80 μm thick and includes a dense cortex (15–25 μm), a diffuse algal layer (30–50 μm), and an indistinct medulla with many small crystals. The photosynthetic partner (photobiont) is Trentepohlia.

The lirellae are chroodiscoid to shortly elongate and erumpent, measuring 0.3–0.5 mm long and 0.2–0.3 mm wide, with a deeply immersed disc that is usually not visible. The thalline margin is well developed and breaks into irregular lobules that can show a reddish tinge. Asci are 80–100 μm long, and the 3-septate ascospores measure 13–16 × 5–7 μm; the spores are strongly amyloid (I+ violet-blue). No secondary metabolites were detected by thin-layer chromatography.

== Habitat and distribution ==
The species is known from Colombia (Caquetá and Amazonas) in lowland forest habitats at about 300–350 m (980–1,150 ft) elevation, where it has been collected growing epiphytically on bark.
