= Fissurina duplicans =

Scientific classification
- Domain: Eukaryota
- Kingdom: Fungi
- Division: Ascomycota
- Class: Lecanoromycetes
- Order: Graphidales
- Family: Graphidaceae
- Genus: Fissurina
- Species: F. duplicans

Binomial name
- Fissurina duplicans M.Cáceres, Aptroot & Lücking (2014)

Species of lichen

Fissurina duplicans is a little-known species of corticolous (bark-dwelling) script lichen in the family Graphidaceae. It is found in primary rainforests of Brazil. The lichen has an endoperidermal thallus and a double margin of lirellae, setting it apart from similar species.

== Taxonomy ==
Fissurina duplicans was formally described as a new species in 2014 by lichenologists Marcela Cáceres, André Aptroot, and Robert Lücking. The type specimen was collected by the first two authors in Fazenda São Francisco, north of Porto Velho (Rondônia, Brazil), where it was found growing on tree bark in a primary rainforest.

== Description ==
Fissurina duplicans grows on tree trunks and has a continuous, endoperidermal thallus that can reach up to 3 cm (1.2 in) in diameter. The lichen's surface is smooth to uneven, with a mottled yellow-green colour and whitish areas surrounding the ascomata. The lichen's photobiont is Trentepohlia, which has yellowish-green, irregularly shaped cells. The photobiont layer is embedded deeply within the thallus, and is 20–30 μm thick.

One of the distinguishing characteristics of Fissurina duplicans is its double margin of lirellae, which separates it from other similar species such as Fissurina pseudostromatica. The lirellae are shortly immersed, unbranched, and formed in whitish, pseudostromatic areas that contrast with the yellow-green parts of the remaining thallus. The ascospores are ellipsoid, hyaline, contain 3 septa; they are smaller than those of F. pseudostromatica.

== Habitat and distribution ==
Fissurina duplicans is currently only known to exist in primary rainforests in the state of Rondônia, Brazil. The species thrives in shaded understory environments within undisturbed rainforests.
