= Fissurina indica =

Scientific classification
- Kingdom: Fungi
- Division: Ascomycota
- Class: Lecanoromycetes
- Order: Graphidales
- Family: Graphidaceae
- Genus: Fissurina
- Species: F. indica

Binomial name
- Fissurina indica B.O.Sharma, Khadilkar & Makhija (2012)

Species of lichen

Fissurina indica is a species of corticolous (bark-dwelling) script lichen in the family Graphidaceae. Described in 2012 from specimens collected in India's Western Ghats, this lichen forms pale green to brownish crusts on tree bark in humid evergreen forests. It produces small, slit-like fruiting structures that lack the black carbonised walls typical of many related species, and its ascospores are divided into multiple brick-like compartments. The species has since been found in Assam, suggesting a wider distribution across India's moist hill forests than originally known.

== Taxonomy ==
Fissurina indica is a script lichen in the family Graphidaceae. It was described in 2012 by Bharati Sharma, Pradnya Khadilkar and Urmila Makhija on the basis of a specimen gathered in the moist evergreen forest of Wayanad (Kerala, southern India). The holotype came from bark in the Wynad Wildlife Sanctuary, and the specific epithet denotes its Indian origin.

The species was one of nine Fissurina taxa newly introduced in the same treatment; subsequent floristic surveys have confirmed its presence farther north-east in Assam, indicating a wider distribution within the Indian subcontinent than the type locality alone suggests. The original authors placed F. indica among others in the genus that have dumastii-type lirellae (slit-like fruit bodies with acute ends and only weak carbonisation), a character that helps distinguish it from relatives such as F. cingalina and F. dumastii.

== Description ==
The thallus forms a continuous, glossy crust of pale green to greenish-brown that becomes cracked and verrucose (warted) with age. A narrow black hypothallus often outlines the colony. Slender lirellae—each 0.2–0.4 mm long—are scattered across the surface; they share the thallus colour, taper to sharp points and sit flush with the cortex before the surrounding tissue splits slightly and raises them. Their walls (exciple) remain pale and never develop the thick black carbon layer seen in many graphid lichens.

Internally the colourless hymenium produces hyaline, muriform spores (i.e. divided into multiple 'brick-like' chambers by both transverse and longitudinal septa). The ascospores measure 32–42 × 12–20 μm and are enveloped by a faint gelatinous halo that is best seen in water mounts. No lichen secondary metabolites have been detected by thin-layer chromatography or standard spot tests, a trait that also helps separate the species from chemically productive members of the genus.

== Habitat and distribution ==
Fissurina indica is corticolous, growing on the bark of living trees in humid, shaded situations. Confirmed records come from the Western Ghats (Wayanad district, Kerala) and from several sites in the hill forests of Assam. All collections to date are from mature, relatively undisturbed evergreen or semi-evergreen woodland where persistent moisture favours corticolous lichens. It is one of 15 species of Fissurina that have been recorded from Assam.
