= Fissurina aggregatula =

Scientific classification
- Kingdom: Fungi
- Division: Ascomycota
- Class: Lecanoromycetes
- Order: Graphidales
- Family: Graphidaceae
- Genus: Fissurina
- Species: F. aggregatula

Binomial name
- Fissurina aggregatula Common & Lücking (2011)

Species of lichen-forming fungus

Fissurina aggregatula is a lichen that forms a thin, crust-like growth on bark and belongs to the family Graphidaceae. It was first described from Fakahatchee Strand Preserve State Park in southwestern Florida. There, it forms small clusters of short lirellae (slit-like fruiting structures), and standard chemical tests (thin-layer chromatography) did not detect any lichen substances.

== Taxonomy ==
The species was described as new in 2011 by Ralph Common and Robert Lücking, based on specimens collected in Collier County, Florida. The holotype (the single specimen designated as the name-bearing type; Common 7356A) was gathered in April 1997 along the K2 trail in a second-growth area among royal palms. It is housed in the herbarium of the Michigan State University Museum (MSC). The epithet aggregatula refers to the tightly clustered arrangement of the lirellae on the thallus surface.

== Description ==
The thallus forms a crust on bark, typically 1–3 cm (0.4–1.2 in) across and about 40–80 μm (micrometers) thick. The surface is uneven to distinctly roughened, often warty or blistered (bullate), and ranges from yellowish green to olive-brown. Its photobiont (the photosynthetic partner) is a trentepohlioid alga (Trentepohlia-type).

The fruiting structures are fissurine lirellae, arranged in dense, small clusters. Individual lirellae are straight to curved, usually unbranched (sometimes sparsely branched), and about 0.3–0.7 mm long. In these lirellae, the disk (spore-producing surface) is concealed, and the lips (labia) are thick and yellowish white. Microscopically, the asci are fusiform (spindle-shaped) and usually contain eight ellipsoid ascospores. The ascospores are 3-septate (divided by three internal walls), about 14–20 × 7–9 μm, and non-amyloid. Chemical screening (thin-layer chromatography) did not detect any lichen substances.

== Habitat and distribution ==
Fissurina aggregatula is known from a few collections in Fakahatchee Strand Preserve State Park (Collier County, Florida). It has been found on the bark of branches of unidentified hardwood trees, in second-growth habitat along trails within the preserve. The lichen has since been recorded from Sikkim, India, and Rondônia, Brazil.
