= Fissurina capsulata =

Scientific classification
- Kingdom: Fungi
- Division: Ascomycota
- Class: Lecanoromycetes
- Order: Graphidales
- Family: Graphidaceae
- Genus: Fissurina
- Species: F. capsulata

Binomial name
- Fissurina capsulata Makhija & Adaw. (2007)

Species of lichen

Fissurina capsulata is a species of corticolous (bark-dwelling) script lichen in the family Graphidaceae. Found in India, it was formally described as a new species in 2007 by Urmila Makhija and Bharati Adawadkar. The lichen is native to Kodaikanal, Tamil Nadu, where it was first identified near Daisy Bank in 1975.

== Description ==
This lichen has a pale green or dull green thallus, which is uneven and cracked. The ascomata, or fruiting bodies, are lirelline in form and range from 0.5 to 2.5 mm in length. These structures can be simple or branched and are generally the same colour as the thallus. The ascomata are immersed to slightly raised, with acute to subacute ends, and a have narrow to moderately broad disc that is not pruinose.

The exciple, a protective layer surrounding the fertile, spore-bearing hymenium, is complete and non-striate, with a yellowish-brown colour that converges and is covered by a thalline exciple up to the top. The rounded apical region of this structure features a swollen "puff" that is interspersed with crystals. The hymenium is hyaline and 63–71 μm high. The hypothecium is distinct, thin, and pale, measuring 6–8 μm in height. Fissurina capsulata has simple, long paraphyses with warty tips, and short to moderately elongate periphysoids measuring 4–6 μm in length, also with warty tips. Its asci are 8-spored and measure 60–70 by 8–10 μm. The ascospores are hyaline, ellipsoidal, always contain 3 transverse septa, and measure 11–16 by 4–5 μm. They feature a large, conspicuous halo that is 3–5 μm thick, narrow at one end, and thick at the other end.

The lichen's chemistry reveals that it does not contain any lichen products, and it tests negative on all standard spot tests. Fissurina capsulata shares a similar ascomatal structure with other Fissurina species but is distinguished by the size of its lirellae and unique ascospore features. Notably, it differs from F. subcontexta, F. marginata, F. rufula, and other similar species in various aspects, such as lirellae length, ascospore size, and the presence of different lichen substances.
