= Fissurina analphabetica =

Scientific classification
- Kingdom: Fungi
- Division: Ascomycota
- Class: Lecanoromycetes
- Order: Graphidales
- Family: Graphidaceae
- Genus: Fissurina
- Species: F. analphabetica

Binomial name
- Fissurina analphabetica Common & Lücking (2011)

Species of lichen-forming fungus

Fissurina analphabetica is a species of crustose lichen in the family Graphidaceae. It was first described from collections made in Florida. It has extremely small, fissure-like lirellae (slit-like fruiting structures), and standard chemical screening (thin-layer chromatography) did not detect any lichen substances.

== Taxonomy ==
The species was described as new to science in 2011 by Ralph Common and Robert Lücking. The holotype (the single specimen designated as the name-bearing type; Common 7356N) was collected in April 1997 in Fakahatchee Strand Preserve State Park (Collier County, Florida), along the K2 trail in a second-growth area among royal palms. It is deposited in the herbarium of the Michigan State University Museum (MSC). The specific epithet analphabetica is a wordplay on the superficially similar Fissurina illiterata, discussed as a lookalike in the same group of species.

== Description ==
The thallus forms a crust on bark and is typically 0.5–1 cm across and about 30–60 μm thick. It forms a continuous crust with a smooth to slightly uneven, pale greenish-white surface. The photobiont (the photosynthetic partner) is a trentepohlioid alga (Trentepohlia-type). In cross-section, the thallus has an upper cortex made of prosoplectenchymatous tissue, and an irregular algal layer with clusters of crystals.

The lirellae are straight to curved and may be unbranched or irregularly branched. They are erumpent (breaking through the thallus surface) and fissurine, with a thick, complete thalline margin. Individual lirellae are very small (about 0.3–0.5 mm long and about 0.1 mm wide and high). The disc is concealed, and the labia are inconspicuous to slightly swollen, appearing brown along the slit. Microscopically, the asci usually contain eight ellipsoid ascospores. The spores are 3-septate (divided by three internal walls), about 13–18 × 7–9 μm, and non-amyloid (I–). They were described as having "trypethelioid" to thin septa and lumina. Chemical screening (thin-layer chromatography) did not detect any lichen substances.

Fissurina analphabetica belongs to a group of Fissurina species with 3-septate, non-amyloid ascospores and no detectable lichen substances, but it is set apart by its exceptionally small, delicate lirellae. It was contrasted with F. tachygrapha, which has similarly delicate lirellae but a thallus that is endoperidermal and ecorticate (lacking a cortex) and may have more rounded spore lumina and sometimes weak amyloidity. It was also contrasted with F. illiterata, which is often more ecorticate and may have more rounded spore lumina; weak amyloidity has also been reported. Thickened paraphyses (sterile filaments among the asci) were reported in F. illiterata but not in F. analphabetica.

== Habitat and distribution ==
Fissurina analphabetica is known from multiple collections in Florida, including Fakahatchee Strand Preserve State Park (Collier County), and additional records elsewhere in the state. It grows on the bark of hardwoods. Florida records include Osceola National Forest (Baker County), Hillsborough River State Park (Hillsborough County), and sites in Polk County (including along county roads), in addition to the type locality at Fakahatchee.
