= Fissurina andamanensis =

Scientific classification
- Domain: Eukaryota
- Kingdom: Fungi
- Division: Ascomycota
- Class: Lecanoromycetes
- Order: Graphidales
- Family: Graphidaceae
- Genus: Fissurina
- Species: F. andamanensis

Binomial name
- Fissurina andamanensis B.O.Sharma, Khadilkar & Makhija (2012)

Species of lichen

Fissurina andamanensis is a species of corticolous (bark-dwelling) script lichen in the family Graphidaceae. Found in the Andaman Islands, it was formally described as a new species in 2012 by Bharati Sharma, Pradnya Khadilkar, and Urmila Makhija. The type specimen was collected from the Betapur Range (Middle Andaman Island). The lichen has a yellowish-brown thallus that is glossy, cracked, and slightly verrucose. It has lirellate ascomata that are 1–6 mm long, simple to irregularly branched, and the same colour as the thallus, with a structure of the dumastii-type. The ascospores have 3 transverse septa, are hyaline, and measure 20–27 by 7–10 μm, with a thin halo. It contains salazinic acid, which is an uncommon lichen product in the genus Fissurina.
