= Fissurina inspersa =

Scientific classification
- Kingdom: Fungi
- Division: Ascomycota
- Class: Lecanoromycetes
- Order: Graphidales
- Family: Graphidaceae
- Genus: Fissurina
- Species: F. inspersa

Binomial name
- Fissurina inspersa Common & Lücking (2011)

Species of lichen-forming fungus

Fissurina inspersa is a species of crustose lichen in the family Graphidaceae. It was first described from collections made in Florida. It has fissure-like lirellae (slit-like fruiting structures) and a strongly inspersed hymenium (the spore-producing layer, filled with tiny droplets that cloud the view under the microscope), and it produces stictic acid as its main secondary metabolite.

== Taxonomy ==
The species was described as new in 2011 by Ralph Common and Robert Lücking. The holotype (the single specimen designated as the name-bearing type; Common 7323C) was collected in April 1997 in Fakahatchee Strand Preserve State Park (Collier County, Florida), along the Scenic Drive (CR 837) near gate 14 in a second-growth area. It is deposited in the herbarium of the Michigan State University Museum (MSC).

The epithet inspersa refers to the densely inspersed hymenium, which was considered uncommon in Fissurina.

== Description ==
The thallus forms a crust on bark and is typically 0.5–1 cm across and about 30–60 μm (micrometers) thick. It forms a continuous crust with a smooth to slightly uneven surface, coloured yellowish to pale greenish white. The photobiont (the photosynthetic partner) is a trentepohlioid alga (Trentepohlia-type). In cross-section, the upper cortex is only partly well-organized, with areas that are more loosely developed, and crystals occur in scattered clusters.

The lirellae are straight to curved, unbranched, and immersed in the thallus. They are fissurine and have a thick, complete thalline margin. Individual lirellae are about 0.5–1 mm long and about 0.1 mm wide and high, with the disk partly exposed and dark gray-pruinose (with a powdery coating), while the labia are inconspicuous. Microscopically, the hymenium is 50–60 μm high and is strongly and densely inspersed (filled with tiny droplets that make the spore-producing layer look cloudy). The inspersion persists even in potassium hydroxide solution (K). The asci usually contain eight ellipsoid ascospores. The spores are 3-septate (divided by three internal walls), about 12–18 × 6–9 μm, and non-amyloid (I–). The thallus contains stictic acid (major) with a trace of constictic acid. In microscopic sections, K produces a yellow efflux (K+ yellow).

Fissurina inspersa is unusual within Fissurina because its hymenium is strongly inspersed, which can make internal structures difficult to see under the microscope. The effect was compared to that seen in some Graphis species, but in F. inspersa the inspersion does not dissolve in K. At the time, no other Fissurina species with an inspersed hymenium was reported in the authors' treatment. Fissurina dumastoides was considered the closest overall match (similar lirellae type, ascospore type, and stictic acid chemistry), but F. inspersa was separated by the inspersion and a darker excipulum. It was also contrasted with Fissurina tachygrapha, which can look similar but lacks inspersion and has a fully ecorticate (lacking a cortex), endoperidermal thallus.

== Habitat and distribution ==
Fissurina inspersa is known from several collections, all from Fakahatchee Strand Preserve State Park in Collier County, Florida, where it grows on the bark of hardwood trees. Additional material was cited from the Scenic Drive near gate 14 and from the K2 trail among royal palms, in a second-growth setting within the preserve.
