= Fissurina chrysocarpa =

Scientific classification
- Domain: Eukaryota
- Kingdom: Fungi
- Division: Ascomycota
- Class: Lecanoromycetes
- Order: Graphidales
- Family: Graphidaceae
- Genus: Fissurina
- Species: F. chrysocarpa

Binomial name
- Fissurina chrysocarpa M.Cáceres, Aptroot & Lücking (2014)

Species of lichen

Fissurina chrysocarpa is a little-known species of script lichen in the family Graphidaceae. Found primarily in the rainforests of Rondônia, Brazil, it is distinguished by its bright orange lirellae.

== Taxonomy ==
Fissurina chrysocarpa was first described scientifically as a new species in 2014 by lichenologists Marcela Cáceres, André Aptroot, and Robert Lücking. The type specimen was collected by the first two authors in November 2012, in the Estação Ecológica de Cuniã (Rondônia, Brazil). The species epithet chrysocarpa refers to the lichen's distinct orange lirellae.

== Description ==
This lichen is characterized by its short lirellae with distinct labia and somewhat muriform ascospores. Its thallus is up to 5 cm (2 in) in diameter, with a smooth to uneven grey surface. The photobiont Trentepohlia (a genus of green algae) occurs in irregular groups in the lichen; their cells are yellowish green and measure 5–9 by 4–7 μm. The ascomata are lirellate, erumpent to prominent, and measure between 1 and 4.5 mm in length. The orange colour of the lirellae comes from an anthraquinone pigment. No lichen products were detected in the collected specimens using thin-layer chromatography analysis. The lirellae react with a purplish violet-colour to the K chemical spot test.

Fissurina chrysocarpa shares similarities with the eastern paleotropical species Fissurina chrysocarpoides. However, F. chrysocarpoides is differentiated by its much longer lirellae with thin, roof-like labia and pigment developed beneath a thin cortical layer. Two other species with pigmented lirellae are Fissurina aurantiacolirellata from New Caledonia and Fissurina aurantiacostellata from Puerto Rico. Both of these species produce isidioid outgrowths, with F. aurantiacolirellata also having sessile lirellae, while F. aurantiacostellata lacks genuine anthraquinone pigments and features stellately branched (i.e., radiating from a common center) lirellae.

== Habitat and distribution ==
Fissurina chrysocarpa is only known to occur in the primary rainforests of Rondônia, Brazil, where it thrives in the shaded understory of undisturbed ecosystems.
