= Fissurina nigrolabiata =

Scientific classification
- Kingdom: Fungi
- Division: Ascomycota
- Class: Lecanoromycetes
- Order: Graphidales
- Family: Graphidaceae
- Genus: Fissurina
- Species: F. nigrolabiata

Binomial name
- Fissurina nigrolabiata Rivas Plata, Bawingan & Lücking (2011)

Species of lichen

Fissurina nigrolabiata is a species of lichen-forming fungus in the family Graphidaceae. It was first discovered in 2011 in the mountain rainforests of the Philippines, where it grows as a thin greenish crust on tree bark. The species has since been found in Brazil, and produces its spores in distinctive black-lipped slits that protrude slightly from the bark surface.

== Taxonomy ==
Fissurina nigrolabiata was first described in 2011 from montane rainforest on Luzon, Philippines, by Eimy Rivas Plata, Patrick Bawingan and Robert Lücking. The species is based on material collected by Rivas Plata on Mount Palali (Nueva Vizcaya province) at an elevation of about 1,400 m in March 2007. The specimen, numbered 1198B, is preserved as the holotype in the Field Museum herbarium (F), with an isotype (duplicate) housed in the CAHUP herbarium in Los Baños.

In 2023 Pieter van den Boom, Harrie Sipman and Lücking published a second lichen from the Azores under the same binomial. Because the 2011 name already occupied the combination, the later usage is an illegitimate later homonym under Art. 53.1 of the International Code of Nomenclature for algae, fungi, and plants; taxonomic databases record it accordingly and a replacement name has yet to be proposed.

== Description ==
Fissurina nigrolabiata forms a thin, bark-dwelling (corticolous) crust up to about 5 cm across and only 30–50 micrometres (μm) thick. Its surface is smooth to slightly uneven, glossy green, and protected by a narrow brick-like (prosoplectenchymatous) cortex. Just beneath this skin lies an irregular layer of green algae along with conspicuous clusters of colourless crystals—features that give the thallus a subtly speckled look in thin section.

The reproductive structures are elongated slits called lirellae. These are straight to gently curved, seldom branched, and protrude slightly from the bark, measuring 1–3 mm long and roughly 0.3–0.4 mm wide and high. Each lirella is framed by a cream-coloured thalline margin, but its lips (labia) are thick, grey-black to brown-black, and capped by a thin translucent cortex; the disc itself remains hidden. Internally the entire exciple—tissue surrounding the hymenium—is heavily blackened (carbonised), reaching 200 μm thick beneath the hymenium. The colourless hymenium rises 120–180 μm and contains eight spindle-shaped asci (80–100 × 15–20 μm) per locule. Each ascus produces eight ellipsoid ascospores divided by several cross-walls (a muriform arrangement), usually 12–17 × 5–8 μm and about twice as long as broad. No secondary metabolites were detected by thin-layer chromatography, and the species lacks detectable asexual propagules.

== Habitat and distribution ==
Fissurina nigrolabiata is a corticolous (bark-dwelling) species and has been documented from the Philippines, and from Brazil.
