= Fissurina disposita =

Scientific classification
- Kingdom: Fungi
- Division: Ascomycota
- Class: Lecanoromycetes
- Order: Graphidales
- Family: Graphidaceae
- Genus: Fissurina
- Species: F. disposita

Binomial name
- Fissurina disposita B.O.Sharma, Khadilkar & Makhija (2012)

Species of lichen

Fissurina disposita is a species of corticolous (bark-dwelling) script lichen in the family Graphidaceae. Described in 2012 from specimens collected near Cherrapunji in Meghalaya, one of the world's rainiest places, this lichen forms pale to mid-brown glossy crusts on tree bark in humid forests. It produces tiny slit-like fruiting structures that remain largely flush with the surface and contain unusual single spores divided into brick-like compartments rather than the typical eight smaller spores. The species has since been found in the shola forests of Karnataka, another wet regions of peninsular India where heavy monsoon rainfall and persistent moisture prevail.

== Taxonomy ==
Fissurina disposita is a script lichen in the family Graphidaceae. It was formally described in 2012 by Bharati Sharma, Pradnya Khadilkar and Urmila Makhija from material collected in a subtropical forest near Cherrapunji, Meghalaya. The holotype grows on tree bark in that exceptionally humid hill terrain, and the species has since been recorded in the shola forests of neighbouring Karnataka. Morphologically it belongs to the comparilis-type subgroup of Fissurina, characterised by narrow lirellae with only weak carbonisation of the exciple.

== Description ==
The thallus forms a pale- to mid-brown, glossy crust that soon becomes cracked, flaking and slightly warty (verrucose). Its margin is outlined by a thin, dark hypothallus. Numerous lirellae – minute slit-like fruit bodies – are scattered across the surface; each is 0.2–0.5 mm long, straight to gently curved, crowded, and terminates in an acute tip. The lirellae sit flush with the thallus at first and rise only slightly as the cortex swells and splits around them. Their walls (the exciple) remain pale rather than developing the thick black melanin layer typical of many other script lichens.

Under the microscope the colourless hymenium produces a single ascospore in each ascus. Spores are hyaline, somewhat muriform—divided into brick-like chambers by three to four cross-walls and one or two longitudinal septa—and measure 10–12 × 5–6 μm. No lichen secondary metabolites were detected in the original collections.

== Habitat and distribution ==
All confirmed records of F. disposita fall within the wetter reaches of the Indian peninsula. The type locality at Cherrapunji lies in one of the world's rainiest subtropical hill forests, while shola forests in Karnataka provide a cooler, mist-laden refuge farther south. In both regions the lichen grows on the smooth bark of living trees in shaded, undisturbed woodland where high humidity and heavy monsoon rainfall prevail.
