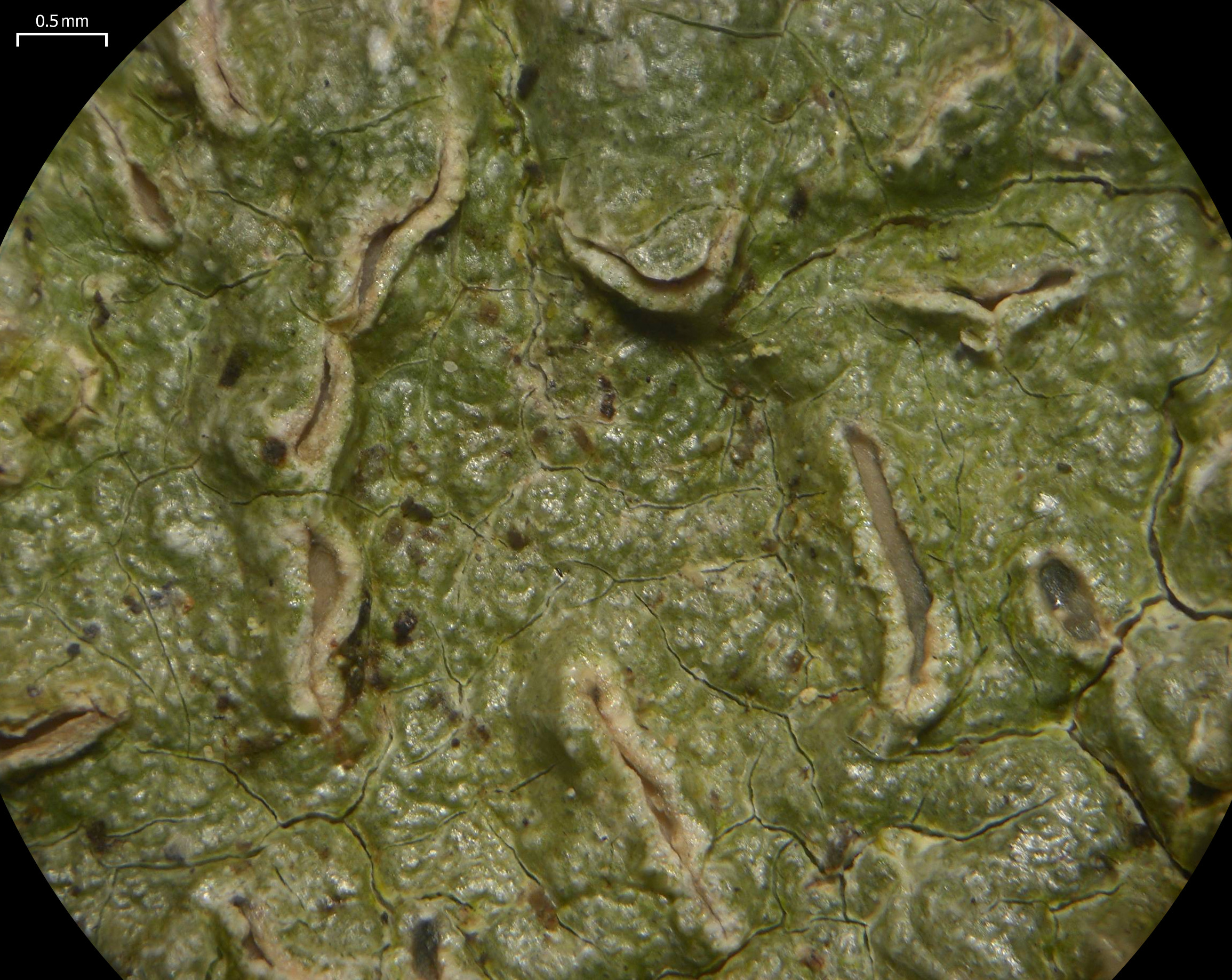
- Closeup of thallus surface, showing several lirellae; scale bar=0.5 mm

Scientific classification
- Kingdom: Fungi
- Division: Ascomycota
- Class: Lecanoromycetes
- Order: Graphidales
- Family: Graphidaceae
- Genus: Fissurina
- Species: F. insidiosa

Binomial name
- Fissurina insidiosa C.Knight & Mitt. (1860)

Synonyms
- Graphis insidiosa (C.Knight & Mitt.) C.Knight & Mitt. (1867)

= Fissurina insidiosa =

Species of lichen

Fissurina insidiosa is a species of corticolous (bark-dwelling), script lichen in the family Graphidaceae. Found in the Southern Hemisphere, it has been recorded from mainland Australia, New Zealand, the Pacific region, the Caribbean, and India.

== Taxonomy ==
The lichen was formally described as a new species by Charles Knight and William Mitten in 1860. They proposed to transfer it to the genus Graphis in 1867.

== Description ==
The thallus of Fissurina insidiosa is characterised by its dull grey to dingy olive-grey colour and glossy appearance. Typically, it forms widespread, diffuse patches that can extend up to approximately 10 cm (4 in) wide. The thallus is usually continuous but often displays cracks and is between 20 and 100 μm thick. It contains crystals of calcium oxalate.

The lirellae of this species are scattered and typically very numerous. They range in shape from simple to occasionally forked and can be straight, curved, or sinuous, extending up to 2.5 mm in length. Initially, they appear as cracks in the thallus, with the cortex edges curving upwards to form a pseudo-margin. Over time, these develop into a pair of swollen, pale beige-brown lips, which are often cracked and rough, measuring 0.3 to 0.9 mm in width. The disc of the lirellae remains obscured.

The exciple, visible in cross-section, is poorly differentiated from adjacent tissues and measures 10 to 30 μm thick. It has a yellow colour, which reacts K+ (orange-red). The periphysoids are seldom observed and are approximately 3 μm thick without any warty features. The hypothecium layer is relatively thin, ranging from 10 to 20 μm in thickness.

The hymenium layer is more substantial, measuring between 90 and 120 μm thick. The asci typically contain 6 to 8 spores and measure 85 to 110 by 18 to 25 μm, although intact asci are rarely observed. The paraphyses are slender, about 1 to 1.5 μm wide, with tips that are neither expanded nor adorned with warts or spines.

The ascospores are broadly ellipsoidal with rounded ends, and they display a transverse 3-septate structure. They measure approximately 13 to 25 by 6 to 9 μm and feature a halo that can swell when exposed to a solution of potassium hydroxide. Initially, the locules of the spores have a lens shape but soon become rounded.

=== Similar species ===
Fissurina dumasti is similar in appearance to F. insidiosa, but differs in thallus and apothecial morphology, and the ascospores of F. dumastii are distinctly amyloid, a characteristic absent in F. insidiosa.

== Habitat and distribution ==
This species has a broad distribution in the Southern Hemisphere, with recorded presences in mainland Australia, New Zealand, the Pacific region, the Caribbean, and India.
