= Fissurina atlantica =

Scientific classification
- Domain: Eukaryota
- Kingdom: Fungi
- Division: Ascomycota
- Class: Lecanoromycetes
- Order: Graphidales
- Family: Graphidaceae
- Genus: Fissurina
- Species: F. atlantica

Binomial name
- Fissurina atlantica T.A.Pereira, M.Cáceres & Lücking (2018)

Species of lichen

Fissurina atlantica is a species of corticolous (bark-dwelling) script lichen in the family Graphidaceae. Found in Brazil, it was formally described as a new species in 2018 by Thamires Almeida Pereira, Marcela Eugenia da Silva Cáceres, and Robert Lücking. The type specimen was collected from the Mata do Cipó (Capela e Siriri, Sergipe) at an elevation between 80 and 100 m (260 and 330 ft); here, in an Atlantic Rainforest remnant, it was found growing in the understory. The lichen has a white-grey to pale yellowish-grey or cream-colored thallus lacking a prothallus, and reaches a diameter of 1–5 cm (0.4–2.0 in). It is the first species in genus Fissurina to form soralia. The species epithet atlantica refers to its habitat.
