= Fissurina khasiana =

Scientific classification
- Kingdom: Fungi
- Division: Ascomycota
- Class: Lecanoromycetes
- Order: Graphidales
- Family: Graphidaceae
- Genus: Fissurina
- Species: F. khasiana

Binomial name
- Fissurina khasiana Makhija & Adaw. (2007)

Species of lichen

Fissurina khasiana is a species of corticolous (bark-dwelling) script lichen in the family Graphidaceae. It is found in India, specifically in the evergreen forests of Upper Shillong in the Khasi Hills; its species name is derived from the region where it was first collected. The lichen was formally described as a new species in 2007 by Urmila Makhija and Bharati Adawadkar.

== Description ==
The thallus of Fissurina khasiana is greyish-green in colour, with a smooth and cracked surface that appears pruinose. Its ascomata, or fruiting bodies, are lirelline in form and measure 2–4 mm in length and 0.1 mm in width. They can be simple or irregularly branched, immersed, and end in a sharp or somewhat acute tip. The disc of the ascomata is narrow, black, and indistinct. The exciple is present at the base, non-striate, and non-carbonized, with a round and somewhat puffed appearance. It is mostly convergent to slightly divergent and covered by a thalline margin up to the top.

The hymenium is hyaline, not inspersed, and ranges from 80 to 100 μm in height. The hypothecium is also hyaline. Paraphyses are simple, long, and thin, with slightly elongate, warty tips. Periphysoids are short and mostly smooth, occasionally having warty tips. Asci are cylindrical, 6–8-spored, and measure 50–60 by 6–8 μm. The ascospores are ellipsoidal with 3 transverse septa, and measure 16–19 by 8–10 μm and a 1.6–2 μm-thick halo.

Chemical spot tests reveal that the thallus of Fissurina khasiana has K+ (yellow-red), C−, KC−, P+ (orange), and UV− reactions. The lichen contains both constictic and stictic acids. The ascomatal structure of the species is considered to be of the "comparilis-type." However, Fissurina khasiana is distinct from other species in this group due to the presence of both stictic and constictic acids in its thallus.

Fissurina khasiana has an ascomatal structure that is intermediate between Fissurina inquinata and F. triticea. It is distinguished by its relatively minor "puffing" and a non-carbonized exciple, setting it apart from both F. inquinata, which has little "puffing" and a carbonized exciple, and F. triticea, which has strongly "puffed" ascomata and a non-carbonized exciple. Additionally, Fissurina triticea has larger and more rounded ascospores, measuring 15–20 by 10–15 μm.
