= Fissurina amazonica =

Scientific classification
- Domain: Eukaryota
- Kingdom: Fungi
- Division: Ascomycota
- Class: Lecanoromycetes
- Order: Graphidales
- Family: Graphidaceae
- Genus: Fissurina
- Species: F. amazonica

Binomial name
- Fissurina amazonica M.Cáceres, Aptroot & Lücking (2014)

Species of lichen

Fissurina amazonica is a little-known species of corticolous (bark-dwelling) script lichen in the family Graphidaceae. Found in Brazil, it is a shade-loving species that thrives in the understory of undisturbed rainforests.

== Taxonomy ==
Fissurina amazonica was scientifically described as a new species in 2014 by lichenologists Marcela Cáceres, André Aptroot, and Robert Lücking. The type specimen was found specifically at the UNIR Federal University campus south of Porto Velho in Rondônia, Brazil. The species epithet refers to the Amazon rainforest, where the lichen was discovered.

== Description ==
This lichen is characterized by its small, closed, and densely branched lirellae, as well as paraphyses that are smooth at their tips. These features distinguish it from the similar Fissurina dumastii, which has larger lirellae and a different appearance. Fissurina amazonica has a greyish-green thallus with a smooth to uneven texture, which can reach up to 5 cm (2 in) in diameter; there is no prothallus surrounding the thallus. Its photobiont partner is Trenephlia, a genus of green algae.

The ascospores of Fissurina amazonica are ellipsoid to oval in shape, contain 3 septa, and measure 13–17 by 6–8 μm. They are hyaline and have lens-shaped to angular lumina. Only a few ascospores have been observed in the available material, so their full range of morphological variation is not yet known. No secondary chemical substances have been detected in Fissurina amazonica, and both the medulla and microscopic sections showing negative reactions to standard chemical tests.

== Habitat and distribution ==
Fissurina amazonica was originally described from primary rainforest habitats in the state of Rondônia, Brazil. It is a shade-loving species that thrives in the understory of undisturbed rainforests. The lichen's inconspicuous nature has likely led to it being misidentified as Fissurina dumastii in the past, but its unique phylogenetic placement and morphological differences warrant its recognition as a separate species. In 2020, it was recorded from the Atlantic Forest remnant in Pedra Talhada (Alagoas, eastern Brazil).
