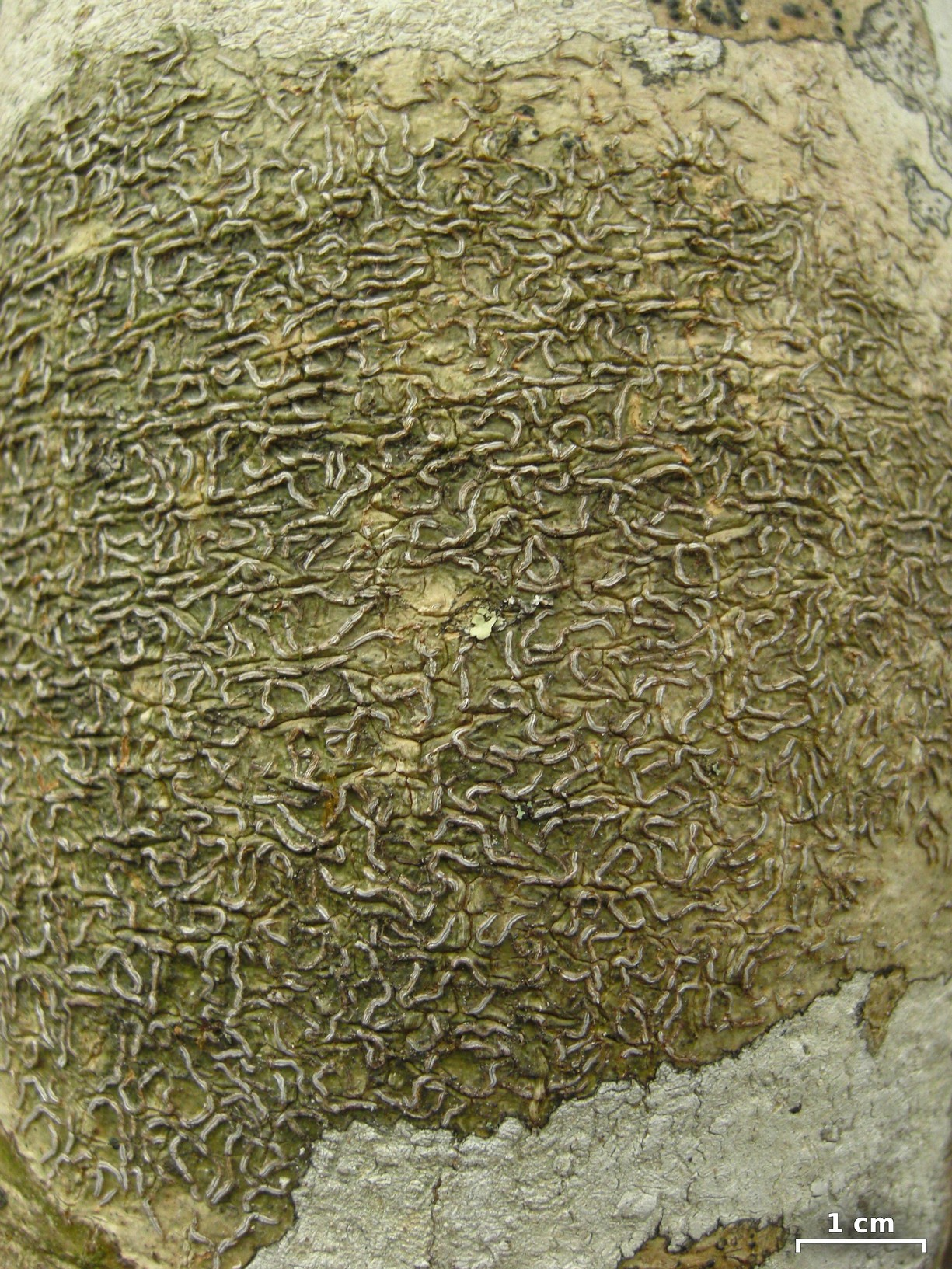
- Fissurina subcontexta

Scientific classification
- Kingdom: Fungi
- Division: Ascomycota
- Class: Lecanoromycetes
- Order: Graphidales
- Family: Graphidaceae
- Genus: Fissurina; Feé (1825)

Synonyms
- Oxystoma Eschw. (1824); Aulacographa Leight. (1854); Diplolabia A.Massal. (1854); Dyplolabia A.Massal. (1854); Diplographis Kremp. ex A.Massal. (1860); Anomomorpha Nyl. ex Hue (1891); Digraphis Clem. (1909); Graphidomyces E.A.Thomas ex Cif. & Tomas. (1953)

= Fissurina =

Genus of fungi

Fissurina is a genus of lichenized fungi in the family Graphidaceae. It has about 160 species, most of which are found in tropical regions.

== Taxonomy ==
The genus was circumscribed by the French botanist Antoine Laurent Apollinaire Fée in an 1825 publication. Some later authors preferred to use the name Fissurina to describe infrageneric (i.e., below genus level) groups of the genus Graphis, such as Edvard Vainio in 1921 who used it as a subgenus, and Alexander Zahlbruckner (1923) and Karl Redinger (1935), who used the name for sections.

Fissurina is in the family Graphidaceae. In 2018, Kraichak and colleagues, using a "temporal phylogenetic" approach to identify temporal bands for specific taxonomic ranks, proposed placing Fissurina as the type genus of Fissurinaceae, a family originally proposed by Brendan P. Hodkinson in 2012. This taxonomic proposal was rejected by Robert Lücking in a critical 2019 review of the temporal method for the classification of lichen-forming fungi, using this specific example to highlight several drawbacks of this approach.

== Description ==
Fissurina is characterized by fissurine ascocarps (i.e., having a fissured or slit-like disc), poorly developed and non-carbonized or weakly carbonized exciples, and 1-8 spored asci that make thick-walled, trans-septate or muriform hyaline ascospores often with a halo. Acanthothecis is a similar genus with warty paraphyses and periphysoids but can be differentiated from Fissurina by the cylindrical spore locules without a thick jelly-like spore wall. Graphis differs from Fissurina by its carbonized, well-developed exciple (labia) and ascospores without a halo.

== Species ==
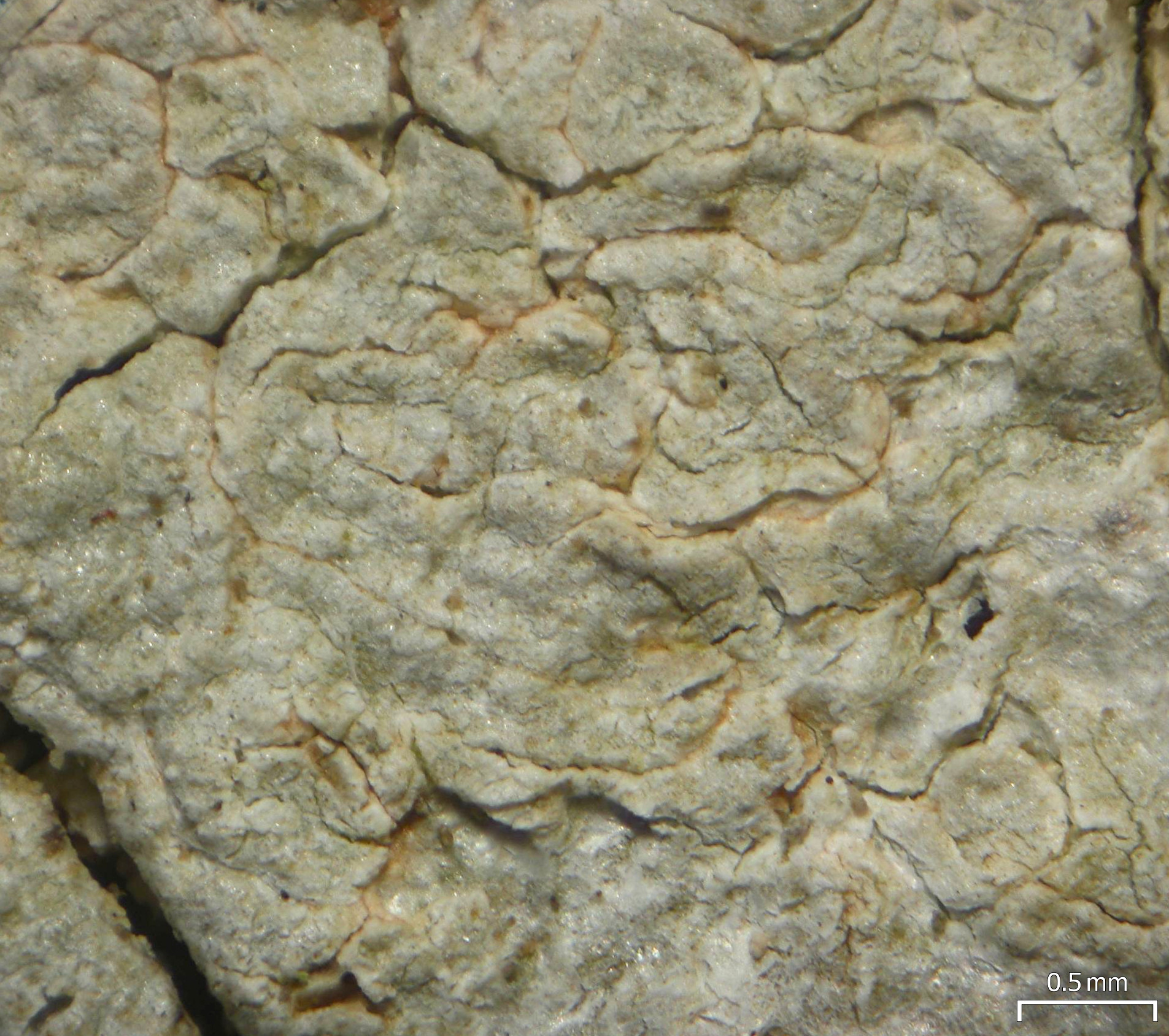
Fissurina alligatorensis

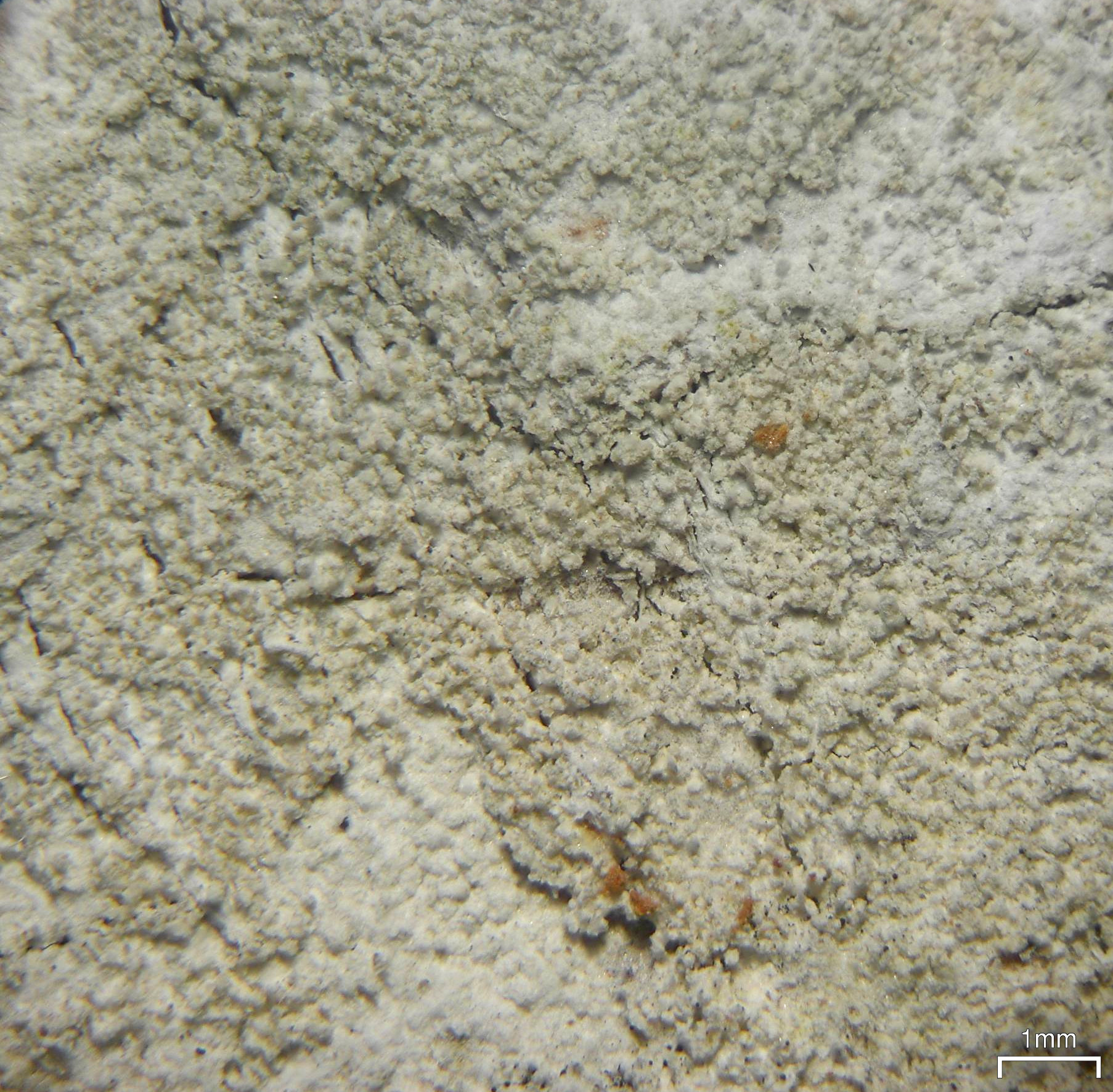
Fissurina cypressi

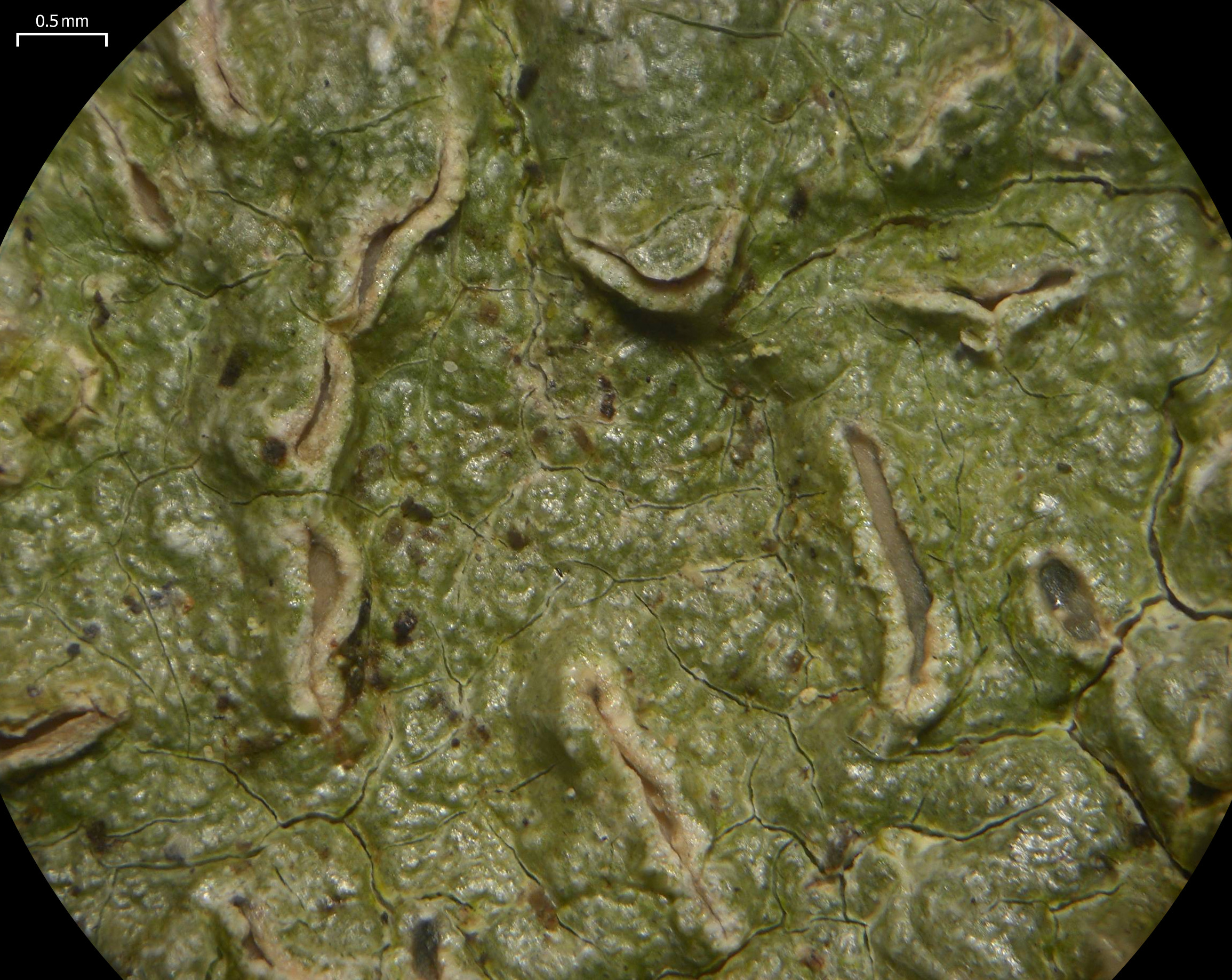
Fissurina insidiosa

- Fissurina abdita (A.W.Archer) A.W.Archer (2005)
- Fissurina adscribens (Nyl.) Z.F.Jia & Lücking (2017)
- Fissurina aggregatula Common & Lücking (2011) – Florida
- Fissurina albocinerea (Vain.) Staiger (2002)
- Fissurina albolabiata Seavey & J.Seavey (2017) – Florida
- Fissurina albonitens (Müll.Arg.) A.W.Archer (2005)
- Fissurina alligatorensis Lendemer & R.C.Harris (2013)
- Fissurina amazonica M.Cáceres, Aptroot & Lücking (2014) – Brazil
- Fissurina americana Lendemer & R.C. Harris (2013)
- Fissurina amyloidea M.Cáceres, Aptroot & Lücking (2014)
- Fissurina analphabetica Common & Lücking (2011) – Florida
- Fissurina andamanensis B.O.Sharma, Khadilkar & Makhija (2012) – India
- Fissurina aperta Herrera-Camp., Barcenas-Peña & Lücking (2019)
- Fissurina astroisidiata Herrera-Camp. & Lücking (2011)
- Fissurina atlantica T.A.Pereira, M.Cáceres & Lücking (2018) – Brazil
- Fissurina aurantiacolirellata Papong, Lücking & Kraichak (2014)
- Fissurina aurantiacostellata Merc.-Díaz, Lücking & Parnmen (2014)
- Fissurina baishanzuensis Kalb & Z.F.Jia (2014)
- Fissurina batavana (Zahlbr.) M.Nakan., Kashiw. & K.H.Moon (2011)
- Fissurina bullata Mangold, Lücking & Lumbsch (2014)
- Fissurina capsulata Makhija & Adaw. (2007) – India
- Fissurina carassensis Lücking, Parnmen & Lumbsch (2015)
- Fissurina chapsoides Sipman (2014)
- Fissurina chrysocarpa M.Cáceres, Aptroot & Lücking (2014) – Brazil
- Fissurina chrysocarpoides (Vain.) Lücking (2014)
- Fissurina cinereodisca Altamirano, Colín & N. Sánchez (2019)
- Fissurina cingalina (Nyl.) Staiger (2002)
- Fissurina coarctata Makhija & Adaw. (2007) – India
- Fissurina columbina (Tuck.) Staiger (2002)
- Fissurina comparilis (Nyl.) Nyl. (1888)
- Fissurina comparimuralis Staiger (2002)
- Fissurina confusa Common & Lücking (2011) – Florida
- Fissurina crystallifera Merc.-Díaz, Lücking & Parnmen (2014)
- Fissurina cypressi (Müll.Arg.) Lendemer (2007)
- Fissurina disposita B.O.Sharma, Khadilkar & Makhija (2012) – India
- Fissurina dumastii Fée (1825)
- Fissurina dumastioides (Fink) Staiger (2002)
- Fissurina duplicans M. Cáceres, Aptroot & Lücking (2014)
- Fissurina duplomarginata Weerakoon & Lücking (2015) – Singapore
- Fissurina elaiocarpa (A.W.Archer) A.W.Archer (2005)
- Fissurina elixii (A.W.Archer) A.W.Archer (2005)
- Fissurina evanida (Vain.) Staiger & Kalb (2004)
- Fissurina flavicans (Kashiw.) M.Nakan. & Kashiw. (2003)
- Fissurina flavomedullosa Rivas Plata & Lücking (2012) – Peru
- Fissurina fujisanensis (Kashiw. & M.Nakan.) M.Nakan. & Kashiw. (2003)
- Fissurina furfuracea (Leight.) A.W.Archer (2007)
- Fissurina fuscoalba Papong, Lücking & Kraichak (2014)
- Fissurina gigas Sipman (2014)
- Fissurina glauca Staiger (2002)
- Fissurina globulifica (Nyl.) Staiger (2002)
- Fissurina hemithecioides S.Joshi, Upreti & Hur (2015) – Vietnam
- Fissurina homichlodes (Redinger) Luch & Lücking (2018)
- Fissurina howeana (A.W.Archer) A.W.Archer (2005)
- Fissurina humilis (Vain.) Staiger (2002)
- Fissurina ilicicola Lendemer & R.C.Harris (2014)
- Fissurina illiterata (R.C.Harris) Lendemer (2008)
- Fissurina immersa B.O.Sharma, Khadilkar & Makhija (2012) – India
- Fissurina inabensis (Vain.) M.Nakan. & Kashiw. (2003)
- Fissurina incisura Seavey & J.Seavey (2017)
- Fissurina indica B.O.Sharma, Khadilkar & Makhija (2012) – India
- Fissurina insidiosa C.Knight & Mitt. (1860)
- Fissurina inspersa Common & Lücking (2011) – Florida
- Fissurina intercludens (Nyl.) Lücking & Rivas Plata (2011)
- Fissurina isidiata Z.F.Jia (2013)
- Fissurina isohypocrellina Aptroot (2022) – Brazil
- Fissurina jaliscoensis Herrera-Camp., Barcenas-Peña & Lücking (2019)
- Fissurina karnatakensis Makhija & Adaw. (2007) – India
- Fissurina khasiana Makhija & Adaw. (2007) – India
- Fissurina linoana Lücking, B.Moncada & G.Rodr. (2018)
- Fissurina longiisidiata Aptroot (2014)
- Fissurina longiramea Makhija & Adaw. (2007) – India
- Fissurina lumbschiana Weerakoon, Jayalal & Lücking (2015)
- Fissurina macrospora M.Cáceres, Aptroot & Lücking (2014)
- Fissurina mexicana (Zahlbr.) Lücking & Rivas Plata (2011) – Florida
- Fissurina microcarpa B.O.Sharma, Khadilkar & Makhija (2012) – India
- Fissurina micromma (Zahlbr.) Aptroot (2004)
- Fissurina monilifera Merc.-Díaz, Lücking & Parnmen (2014)
- Fissurina nicobarensis B.O.Sharma, Khadilkar & Makhija (2012) – India
- Fissurina nigrolabiata Rivas Plata, Bawingan & Lücking (2011)
- Fissurina niveoalba Poengs. & Kalb (2014) – Thailand
- Fissurina paradoxica (A.W.Archer) A.W.Archer (2005)
- Fissurina parvicarpa (Makhija & Adaw.) Pushpi Singh & Kr.P.Singh (2020)
- Fissurina phuluangii Poengs. & Kalb (2014) – Thailand
- Fissurina platythecioides Rivas Plata & Lücking (2012) – Peru
- Fissurina praetermissa A.W.Archer & Elix (2007)
- Fissurina pseudostromatica Lücking & Rivas Plata (2011) – Florida
- Fissurina psoromica (A.W.Archer) A.W.Archer (2005)
- Fissurina redingerioides Lücking, J.E.Hern. & Kalb (2012)
- Fissurina reticulata R.Miranda, Herrera-Camp. & Lücking (2019)
- Fissurina rubiginosa (Fée) Staiger (2002)
- Fissurina rufula (Mont.) Staiger (2002)
- Fissurina scolecitis (Tuck.) Lendemer (2007)
- Fissurina seychellensis Lücking & Diederich (2017)
- Fissurina shivamoggensis Pushpi Singh & Kr.P.Singh (2017)
- Fissurina simplex B.O.Sharma, Khadilkar & Makhija (2012) – India
- Fissurina simulans (Leight.) A.W.Archer (2007)
- Fissurina sipmanii Lücking, B.Moncada & Álvaro (2023) – Colombia
- Fissurina sporolata B.O.Sharma, Khadilkar & Makhija (2012) – India
- Fissurina srilankensis Weerakoon, Wijey. & Lücking (2012) – Sri Lanka
- Fissurina stegoboloides Papong, Lücking & Kraichak (2014)
- Fissurina streimannii (A.W.Archer) A.W.Archer (2005)
- Fissurina stromatoides (H.Magn.) Luch & Lücking (2018)
- Fissurina subcomparimuralis Common & Lücking (2011)
- Fissurina subcontexta (Nyl.) Nyl. (1888)
- Fissurina subcorallina Komposch (2016)
- Fissurina subfurfuracea M.Cáceres, Aptroot & Lücking (2014)
- Fissurina submonospora B.O.Sharma, Khadilkar & Makhija (2012) – India
- Fissurina subnitidula (Nyl.) Staiger (2002)
- Fissurina subtropica (M.Nakan.) M.Nakan. & Kashiw. (2003)
- Fissurina subundulata Kalb & Z.F.Jia (2014) – China
- Fissurina tachygrapha (Nyl.) Staiger (2002)
- Fissurina taeniocarpoides Makhija & Adaw. (2007)
- Fissurina tenuimarginata Herrera-Camp., Barcenas-Peña & Lücking (2019) – Mexico
- Fissurina triticea (Nyl.) Staiger (2002)
- Fissurina tuberculifera Weerakoon, Jayalal & Lücking (2015) – Sri Lanka
- Fissurina tuckermaniana Common & Lücking (2011) – Florida
- Fissurina undulata (Müll.Arg.) M.Nakan. & Kashiw. (2003)
- Fissurina varieseptata Common & Lücking (2011) – Florida
- Fissurina verrucosa Makhija & Adaw. (2007) – India
- Fissurina virensica A.W.Archer & Elix (2018)
- Fissurina vorax Sipman (2014)
- Fissurina zahlbruckneriana Luch & Lücking (2018)
