= Fissurina subcomparimuralis =

Scientific classification
- Kingdom: Fungi
- Division: Ascomycota
- Class: Lecanoromycetes
- Order: Graphidales
- Family: Graphidaceae
- Genus: Fissurina
- Species: F. subcomparimuralis

Binomial name
- Fissurina subcomparimuralis Common & Lücking (2011)

Species of lichen

Fissurina subcomparimuralis is a species of lichen-forming fungus in the family Graphidaceae. The species was formally described in 2014 after being distinguished from the closely related F. comparimuralis by differences in spore characteristics and microscopic structures. It forms thin, yellowish-brown to olive-brown crusts on tree bark with elongated fissures that break through the surface. Originally known only from Florida's Everglades region, it has since been found in China as well.

== Taxonomy ==
Fissurina subcomparimuralis was formally described in 2014 by Ralph Common and Robert Lücking. The species had long been confused with the morphologically similar F. comparimuralis until two stable characters came to light: the new taxon has iodine-negative (I–) ascospores and bears minute spines on the tips of its periphysoids, whereas F. comparimuralis shows a violet-blue staining iodine reaction (I+) in the spores and lacks spinulose periphysoids. Because these traits are considered taxonomically diagnostic within Fissurina, the Florida material was recognised as a distinct species. The specific epithet combines "sub" ('near') with comparimuralis to acknowledge this close—but demonstrably separate—relationship.

== Description ==
The lichen forms a thin, bark-dwelling (corticolous) crust 1–2 cm across and 30–50 μm thick. Its surface is smooth and ranges from yellowish-brown to olive-brown. In cross-section the upper cortex is built from tightly interwoven hyphae (a prosoplectenchyma), beneath which lies an irregular algal layer peppered with clusters of crystals. The reproductive structures are lirellae—elongate fissures 1–3 mm long and about 0.2 mm wide—that break through the thallus surface. They are straight to gently curved, unbranched or only sparsely forked, and retain a complete margin of thallus tissue. The concealed disc sits between grey-black to brown-black lips (labia), under an olive-brown rim.

The excipulum—dark brown-black in color and 20–40 μm wide—is overlaid by the corticate, crystal-bearing thallus. A narrow, colorless to pale yellow hypothecium (5–10 μm high) supports a clear hymenium (the fertile, spore-bearing tissue) 70–90 μm tall, topped by a finely granular grey-brown epithecium. Slender, unbranched paraphyses thread the hymenium, while the ostiole is lined with short, spine-tipped periphysoids. Each fusiform ascus (70–80 × 15–20 μm) holds eight colorless ascospores that are muriform—divided by 5–7 transverse and 1–3 longitudinal walls into a grid of chambers—measure 15–25 × 6–8 μm, and lack the blue iodine staining reaction typical of some close relatives. No lichen substances were detected in F. subcomparimuralis by thin-layer chromatography.

== Habitat and distribution ==
Fissurina subcomparimuralis was originally known to occur only in Fakahatchee Strand Preserve State Park in Collier County, Florida, where it was collected multiple times on the bark of hardwood trees. All preliminary records came from the seasonally humid, low-land forest of this Everglades fringe. In 2023, it was documented from Guangdong Province, China, near the grounds of the South China Botanical Garden. The Chinese collections were quite similar in morphology and chemistry to the Floridian population, except for having a sometimes gaping disc and shorter lirellae.
