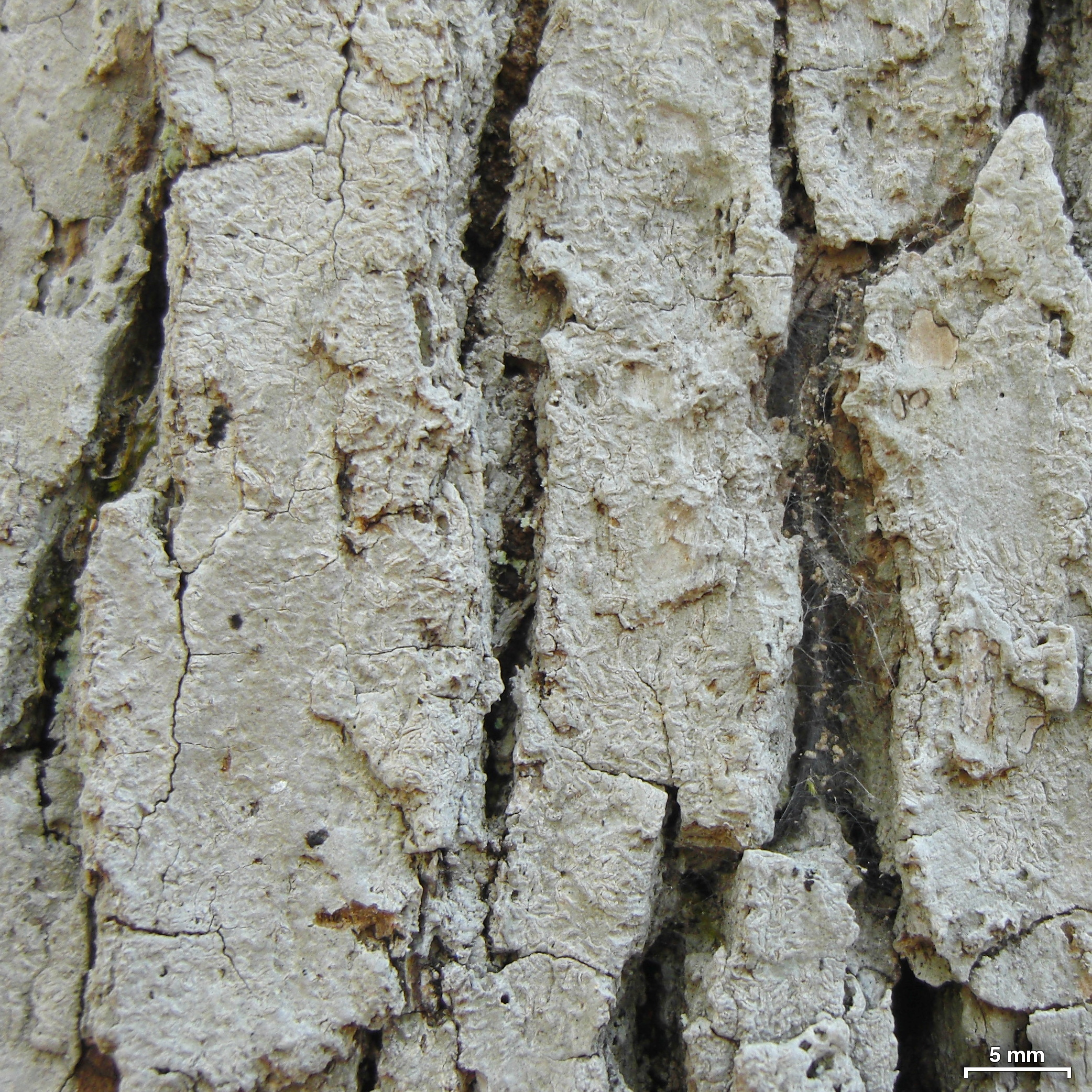
- on sweetgum (Liquidambar styraciflua)

Scientific classification
- Kingdom: Fungi
- Division: Ascomycota
- Class: Lecanoromycetes
- Order: Graphidales
- Family: Graphidaceae
- Genus: Fissurina
- Species: F. alligatorensis

Binomial name
- Fissurina alligatorensis Lendemer & R.C.Harris (2013)

= Fissurina alligatorensis =

Species of lichen-forming fungus

Fissurina alligatorensis is a species of corticolous (bark-dwelling) crustose lichen in the family Graphidaceae. Characteristics of the lichen include its lack of secondary compounds and an ecorticate thallus. Its habitat is centred around the Alligator River National Wildlife Refuge in North Carolina, USA, and it has a preference for soft-barked trees. While it can easily be confused with other Fissurina species, there are specific characters that distinguish it, such as its violet ascospores and its lirellate fruiting bodies.

== Taxonomy ==
Fissurina alligatorensis was formally described by the lichenologists James Lendemer and Richard C. Harris in 2013. Its species epithet, alligatorensis, makes reference to its type locality. The term also symbolically encompasses the expansive swamps and pocosins that envelop the Alligator River drainage and take up considerable areas of Dare, Hyde, Tyrrell, and nearby Currituck counties. The holotype was found by the first author in the Alligator River National Wildlife Refuge in Dare County, North Carolina, in December 2012.

== Description ==
Fissurina alligatorensis is a bark-dwelling lichen with a thin, smooth, ecorticate (i.e., lacking a cortex) thallus that ranges in colour from green-grey to grey. It is marked by large crystal inclusions and is devoid of lichenised diaspores such as isidia or soredia. Its lirellae, or fruiting structures, are non-carbonised, lengthy, flexuous and often branch out extensively in a star-like ("stellate") fashion. The exciple, the outer layer of the apothecium, is also non-carbonised, poorly developed and plain, not grooved. It is hyaline to yellowish-brown at the top and contains large calcium oxalate crystals.

The hymenium, the spore-bearing layer, is clear, not inspersed and measures 80–100 μm in height. The lichen's ascospores are hyaline, obtuse-ellipsoid to more or less spherical, and react I+ (violet) in iodine. They measure 15.5–21.0 by 9.8–12.6 μm and there are typically 8 per ascus (spore sac) initially. However, several spores often abort before maturity. The lichen does not produce pycnidia (asexual fruiting bodies), and it does not exhibit secondary metabolites according to standard chemical spot tests.

== Habitat and distribution ==
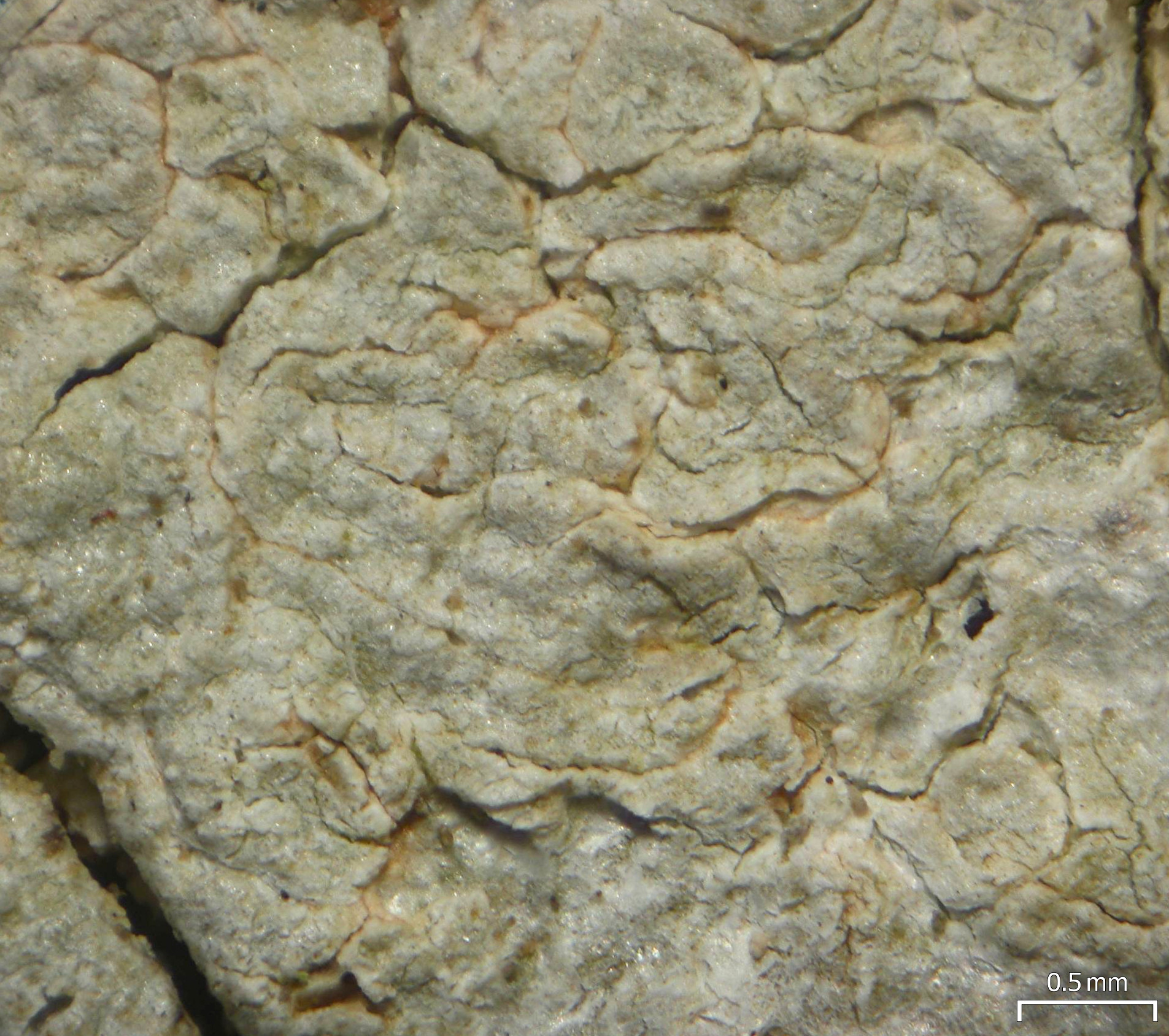
Closeup of thallus surface showing crystalline inclusions

Fissurina alligatorensis is prevalent in swamp, pocosin, and bottomland hardwood forest environments throughout the Mid-Atlantic Coastal Plain and Southeastern Coastal Plain, from northeastern North Carolina to northern Florida. Despite the apparent gap in distribution from central North Carolina through South Carolina to Georgia, the authors anticipate that the species will be found throughout North Carolina and South Carolina as the lichen inventory proceeds southward. The lichen seems absent from the coastal regions of Georgia, suggesting a distribution pattern similar to the Atlantic white cedar or willow oak.

Fissurina alligatorensis has a particular affinity for soft-barked tree species, especially Nyssa, where all known collections have been made. Although it is relatively inconspicuous, it seems to be uncommon or infrequent in most areas and is only abundant in the Alligator River drainage of North Carolina.

== Similar species ==
In the field, Fissurina alligatorensis may be easily confused with other Fissurina members, especially F. illiterata and F. cypressi. F. illiterata typically does not grow on soft-barked substrates and differs from F. alligatorensis with its smaller, shorter lirellae and 4-celled ascospores that do not react to iodine (I−). F. cypressi, on the other hand, is often found alongside the new species, even forming mosaic thalli on the same tree. Nonetheless, it differs from F. alligatorensis in its larger lirellae, usually with an open, white pruinose disc, and large muriform ascospores that also do not react to iodine (I−).

Other species of Fissurina, such as F. egena and F. incrustans, share the combination of muriform, iodine-reactive (I+) violet ascospores, fissurine lirellae, and absence of secondary compounds. However, both of these species differ from F. alligatorensis in having a corticate rather than ecorticate thalli. All these taxa lack secondary compounds detectable with thin-layer chromatography or spot tests. The Colombian species Fissurina linoana differs from F. alligatorensis in the I-negative ascospores with thin walls and septa.

The new species is also similar to some members of the genus Acanthothecis that have ecorticate or weakly corticate thalli. However, they are readily separated by having ornamented paraphyse tips, a characteristic absent in F. alligatorensis.

== Conservation ==
Although Fissurina alligatorensis is widespread within its preferred habitats, it appears to be uncommon or infrequent in most areas, raising potential conservation concerns. At the time of its original publication, its exact distribution range was yet to be fully mapped, with further fieldwork required, particularly in regions such as North Carolina and South Carolina. Additional research was needed to confirm the absence of this lichen species in certain areas such as the Georgia Sea Islands.
