= Fissurina tuckermaniana =

Scientific classification
- Kingdom: Fungi
- Division: Ascomycota
- Class: Lecanoromycetes
- Order: Graphidales
- Family: Graphidaceae
- Genus: Fissurina
- Species: F. tuckermaniana

Binomial name
- Fissurina tuckermaniana Common & Lücking (2011)

Species of lichen-forming fungus

Fissurina tuckermaniana is a lichen that forms a thin, crust-like growth on bark and belongs to the family Graphidaceae. It is known from subtropical Florida. It has fissure-like, darkened lirellae (slit-like fruiting structures) and unusually large ascospores with three septa, produced in low numbers in each ascus. It also has spinulose (spiny-tipped) paraphyses and periphysoids.

== Taxonomy ==
The species was described as new in 2011 by Ralph Common and Robert Lücking. The holotype (the single specimen designated as the name-bearing type; Common 7323D) was collected in April 1997 in Fakahatchee Strand Preserve State Park (Collier County, Florida), along the Scenic Drive (CR 837) near gate 14 in a second-growth area. It is deposited in the herbarium of the Michigan State University Museum (MSC).

The epithet tuckermaniana honors Edward Tuckerman, in recognition of his contributions to North American lichenology. The species resembles Fissurina comparilis and Fissurina comparimuralis in overall appearance, but it can be separated by microscopic features, especially the large 3-septate spores and the spiny structures in the hymenium.

== Description ==
The thallus forms a crust on bark, typically 1–2 cm across and about 30–50 μm (micrometers) thick. It forms a continuous crust with a smooth surface that is yellowish-brown to olive-brown and contains a trentepohlioid photobiont (Trentepohlia-type alga). In cross-section, the thallus has a prosoplectenchymatous upper cortex, an irregular algal layer, and scattered clusters of crystals.

The lirellae are straight to curved and usually unbranched (sometimes sparsely branched), ranging from immersed to slightly erumpent. Individual lirellae are about 1–3 mm long and 0.3–0.5 mm wide, with a complete thalline margin; the disk is concealed. The labia are conspicuous but not thickened, appearing greyish black to brown-black beneath the corticate thalline margin. The excipulum is also darkened (brown-black). Microscopically, the asci are fusiform and contain 2–4 ellipsoid ascospores. The spores are 3-septate (divided by three internal walls), about 25–40 × 11–14 μm, and amyloid (I+ violet-blue). Paraphyses and periphysoids are present, with spinulose (spiny) tips. No lichen substances were detected by thin-layer chromatography.

== Habitat and distribution ==
Fissurina tuckermaniana is known from two collections from Fakahatchee Strand Preserve State Park in southwestern Florida. It was found on the bark of hardwood trees in second-growth habitat along the park's Scenic Drive near gate 14.
