= Fissurina amyloidea =

Scientific classification
- Domain: Eukaryota
- Kingdom: Fungi
- Division: Ascomycota
- Class: Lecanoromycetes
- Order: Graphidales
- Family: Graphidaceae
- Genus: Fissurina
- Species: F. amyloidea

Binomial name
- Fissurina amyloidea M.Cáceres, Aptroot & Lücking (2014)

Species of lichen

Fissurina amyloidea is a little-known species of script lichen in the family Graphidaceae. It is found in the primary rainforests of Rondônia, Brazil. It is characterized by its weakly carbonized lirellae and thick-walled, strongly amyloid ascospores. Despite its superficial similarity to Fissurina subfurfuracea, F. amyloidea exhibits unique anatomical features that set it apart from other species within the genus.

== Taxonomy ==
Lichenologists Marcela Cáceres, André Aptroot, and Robert Lücking first described Fissurina amyloidea as a new species in 2014. The type specimen was collected by the first two authors from tree bark in the Parque Natural Municipal de Porto Velho, (Porto Velho, Rondônia), in March 2012. The species epithet amyloidea refers to the strongly amyloid reaction of the ascospores.

== Description ==
Fissurina amyloidea has a corticolous (bark-dwelling) thallus that can grow up to 5 cm (2 in) in diameter, with a surface that is smooth to uneven and often cracked, ranging from light greyish-green to brownish-yellow. The thallus' section is 70–100 μm thick, with a 10–20 μm thick prosoplectenchymatous cortex, a 20–30 μm-thick photobiont layer, and a 40–50 μm-thick medulla filled with small, grey crystals.

The ascomata are lirellate, erumpent, sparsely to irregularly branched, and weakly carbonized, especially when young. They are 1–2 mm long, 0.2–0.3 mm broad, and 0.12–0.15 mm high. The disc is slightly exposed and pale yellowish-brown. The excipulum is dark brown in young ascomata and becomes yellowish when mature. Ascospores are ellipsoid to oval and contain 3 septa. They measure 13–16 by 7–8 μm and are thick-walled, hyaline, and very strongly amyloid. No secondary chemicals were detected by thin-layer chromatography, and the medulla tested negative for P and K chemical spot test reactions.

Fissurina amyloidea is superficially similar to Fissurina subfurfuracea but has unique anatomical features such as ornamented paraphyses and strongly amyloid ascospores. This species is closely related to F. subnitidula due to its weakly carbonized lirellae and ornamented paraphyses. However, F. amyloidea exhibits a stronger amyloid reaction in its ascospores compared to other species within the genus. The combination of weakly carbonized lirellae, ornamented paraphyses, and strongly amyloid ascospores sets Fissurina amyloidea apart from similar species.

== Habitat and distribution ==
Fissurina amyloidea is known only from the primary rainforests of Rondônia, Brazil. It is a shaded understory species that thrives in undisturbed rainforests.
