= Fissurina elixii =

Scientific classification
- Domain: Eukaryota
- Kingdom: Fungi
- Division: Ascomycota
- Class: Lecanoromycetes
- Order: Graphidales
- Family: Graphidaceae
- Genus: Fissurina
- Species: F. elixii

Binomial name
- Fissurina elixii (A.W.Archer) A.W.Archer (2005)

Synonyms
- Graphis elixii A.W.Archer (1998)

Species of lichen

Fissurina elixii is a species of corticolous (bark-dwelling), script lichen in the family Graphidaceae. It is found in New South Wales and Tasmania in Australia.

== Taxonomy ==
The lichen was first described in 1998 by the lichenologist Alan W. Archer; he initially classified it as a species of genus Graphis. The type specimen was collected from Monga National Park in New South Wales at an elevation of 665 m (2,182 ft); there it was found growing on Eucryphia moorei in a rainforest. The botanical name honours John Elix, who collected the type. Archer transferred the taxon to the genus Fissurina in 2005.

== Description ==
Fissurina elixii has a pale olive-grey, glossy, continuous, and cracked thallus that is 40–100 μm thick and forms irregular, diffuse patches up to 60 mm wide, without crystals of calcium oxalate. Its lirellae (elongated, slit-like reproductive structures) are scattered, unbranched, straight or slightly curved, measuring 0.5–2 mm long, appearing as cracks in the thallus with the cortex forming a pair of lips that gape slightly, revealing the upper edge of the slightly carbonised (blackened) exciple, which usually obscures the disc. In cross-section, the exciple is poorly differentiated from adjacent tissues, varying in thickness and colour from hyaline (translucent) to yellowish laterally and basally to brown-black or olive-black apically, with numerous periphysoids (hair-like structures) at the margins.

The hypothecium (tissue layer beneath the hymenium) of the lichen is 10–20 μm thick, while the hymenium (spore-bearing layer) measures 80–120 μm. The asci (spore-containing structures) typically contain 6–8 spores, measuring 70–100 by 17–25 μm, with paraphyses (filamentous structures in the hymenium) that are 1.5–2 μm wide and have minutely spinous apices. The ascospores are broadly ellipsoid with rounded apices, transversely 3-septate (with three cross-walls), typically measuring 16–26 by 8–11 μm, and has a pale blue staining reaction to iodine when mature. Chemically, the lichen primarily contains 2–methoxypsoromic acid and a minor amount of 2'–O–demethyl–2–methoxypsoromic acid. Although the thallus is generally too thin to reliably conduct chemical spot tests, a P+ (yellow) reaction is possible at the lirellae. Identification of these chemical compounds typically requires high-performance liquid chromatography, as they appear similar to psoromic and conpsoromic acids on thin-layer chromatography plates.

== Habitat and distribution ==
Fissurina elixii has been documented growing on the trunks of Anopterus glandulosus and Tasmannia lanceolata trees within relic stands of Atherosperma-dominated rainforest located in southeastern Tasmania. Additionally, this species is found in eastern New South Wales, although it is relatively rare there. What sets Fissurina elixii apart from other Tasmanian species within its genus is its unique chemical composition, specifically the presence of substances structurally related to psoromic acid.
