= Weerakoon =

Weerakoon is a surname. Notable people with the surname include:

- Ananda Weerakoon (1934–2022), Sri Lankan film actor in the 1950s
- Bradman Weerakoon (1930–2025), Sri Lankan civil servant
- Chamind Weerakoon (born 1972), Sri Lankan former cricketer
- Dharmasiri Weerakoon (1938–2008), Sri Lankan boxer
- Esala Weerakoon, Sri Lankan diplomat, SAARC Secretary General
- Gothamie Weerakoon (born 1973), Sri Lankan based botanist, lichenologist and environmentalist living in London
- Gunaratna Weerakoon (1947–2021), Sri Lankan politician
- Noel Weerakoon, Sri Lankan army officer
- Patricia Weerakoon, Australian Christian sexologist
- Sajeewa Weerakoon (born 1978), former Sri Lankan ODI cricketer
- Sanath Weerakoon (born 1941), Sri Lankan former government agent
- Taneesha Weerakoon (born 1996), Sri Lankan cricketer
