= Fissurina karnatakensis =

Scientific classification
- Kingdom: Fungi
- Division: Ascomycota
- Class: Lecanoromycetes
- Order: Graphidales
- Family: Graphidaceae
- Genus: Fissurina
- Species: F. karnatakensis

Binomial name
- Fissurina karnatakensis Makhija & Adaw. (2007)

Species of lichen

Fissurina karnatakensis is a species of corticolous (bark-dwelling) script lichen in the family Graphidaceae. Found in India, it was formally described as a new species in 2007 by Urmila Makhija and Bharati Adawadkar. It grows on tree trunks in exposed conditions along roadsides within moist forests, particularly in Karnataka, a state known for its many endemic lichen species.

== Description ==
The thallus of Fissurina karnatakensis is brown and slightly glossy, with a smooth to uneven texture with cracks. The periphery of the thallus is delimited by a thin, black hypothalloidal region. The ascomata, or fruiting bodies, are lirelline in form and immersed, matching the colour of the thallus. They can be simple or branched, measuring 1–6 mm in length and 0.25 mm in width. The disc is not visible and very narrow, with a slit-like appearance. The thalline margin is often separated by a narrow slit from the proper exciple.

The exciple is non-striate and present at the base, with a pale orange-brown colour. It is non-carbonized and covered by a distinct corticiform layer. The hymenium, a layer containing the asci, is 105–113 μm high. Paraphyses are approximately 1 μm thick, with hyaline, distinctly warty tips. Periphysoids are short to moderately long and distinctly warty. The asci are 8-spored, and the ascospores, which measure 14–21 by 3–5 μm with a 1–1.6 μm-thick halo, contain 3 transverse septa.

Chemical spot tests reveal that Fissurina karnatakensis has K+ (yellow), C−, KC−, P+ (rust-red), and UV− reactions. It contains protocetraric and fumarprotocetraric acids, which lichen products that are rare in the family Graphidaceae. Fissurina karnatakensis features the "comparilis-type" ascomatal structure and is distinct from other species like Fissurina verrucosa due to its exciple, which often has 2 striae (grooves), smaller ascospores (7–12 μm long), and a verrucose thallus.
