= Fissurina flavomedullosa =

Scientific classification
- Kingdom: Fungi
- Division: Ascomycota
- Class: Lecanoromycetes
- Order: Graphidales
- Family: Graphidaceae
- Genus: Fissurina
- Species: F. flavomedullosa

Binomial name
- Fissurina flavomedullosa Rivas Plata & Lücking (2012)
- Type locality: Los Amigos Biological Station, Peru

Species of lichen-forming fungus

Fissurina flavomedullosa is a species of crustose lichen-forming fungus in the family Graphidaceae. It is a bark-dwelling lichen with a distinctive yellow inner tissue (medulla) and narrow, slit-like fruiting bodies, known from lowland rainforest in Amazonian Peru. The species was described in 2012 and is named for its unusually colored medulla.

== Taxonomy ==
Fissurina flavomedullosa was described as new to science in 2012 by Eimy Rivas Plata and Robert Lücking from material collected in Amazonian Peru. The species epithet refers to its yellow medulla.

== Description ==
The thallus is crustose and grows on bark. It is green-gray, continuous, and up to 10 cm across and 60–120 μm thick, with a smooth to uneven surface and a dense cortex. The photobiont is from the green algal genus Trentepohlia; the photobiont layer has scattered clusters of calcium oxalate crystals. The medulla is yellow, and the base includes a strongly carbonized (blackened) layer about 20–30 μm thick.

The fruiting bodies (lirellae) are wavy (flexuose) and irregularly branched, ranging from sunken in the thallus to partly protruding (immersed to erumpent), and slit-like (fissurine), with a complete covering of thallus tissue (thalline margin). They are 1–2 mm long and 0.07–0.1 mm wide, with the disc hidden from view; the lips (labia) are thin and not frosted (non-pruinose). The spore-bearing layer (hymenium) is 80–100 μm high. Each ascus contains eight oval (ellipsoid), 4-celled (3-septate) ascospores measuring 10–13 × 5–6 μm. The spores have a thick outer wall and thick cross-walls, and stain violet-blue with iodine (I+ violet-blue). Chemically, the inner tissue (medulla) contains a yellow anthraquinone pigment (reacting K+ orange-red).

== Habitat and distribution ==
The species is known from the Los Amigos Research and Training Center (CICRA) in Madre de Dios, Peru, at about 270 m (890 ft) elevation in tropical lowland rainforest. The type collection was made on tree bark in secondary forest in August 2008.
