= Fissurina simplex =

Scientific classification
- Kingdom: Fungi
- Division: Ascomycota
- Class: Lecanoromycetes
- Order: Graphidales
- Family: Graphidaceae
- Genus: Fissurina
- Species: F. simplex

Binomial name
- Fissurina simplex B.O.Sharma, Khadilkar & Makhija (2012)

Species of lichen

Fissurina simplex is a species of corticolous (bark-dwelling), crustose lichen in the family Graphidaceae. Described in 2012 from specimens collected in Kerala's Silent Valley National Park, this lichen forms brown, glossy crusts on tree bark in humid evergreen and deciduous forests of the Western Ghats. It is distinguished by its variable ascospore number (one to four per reproductive cell rather than the typical eight), large spores divided into brick-like compartments, and the presence of stictic acid compounds in its tissues.

== Taxonomy ==
Fissurina simplex is a member of the family Graphidaceae that was formally described as a new species in 2012 by Bharati Sharma, Pradnya Khadilkar and Urmila Makhija. The holotype was collected on 31 December 1981 in Silent Valley, Kerala, India. The authors noted that the species is readily distinguished from other Fissurina taxa by its combination of stictic-series acids, swollen thalline margins, 1–4-spored asci and comparatively large muriform spores.

== Description ==
The thallus forms a brown, glossy crust that cracks and becomes wart-like (verrucose); a narrow black hypothallus outlines its edge. Fruit bodies are lirellae—narrow, slit-like structures—0.5–1.5 mm long, usually straight but sometimes curved. They are the same colour as the thallus, begin immersed and become slightly raised as the surrounding tissue swells and splits. Each lirella ends in an acute tip and has a non-carbonised orange-brown exciple; the swollen thalline margin overlies an orange-brown corticiform layer 10–12 micrometres (μm) thick that contains crystals.

Inside, the clear hymenium is 120–150 μm high. Asci contain one to four colourless, muriform ascospores measuring 70–78 × 20–25 μm; a thin gelatinous halo surrounds each spore. Chemical tests detect stictic and hypostictic acids in the thallus.

== Habitat and distribution ==
Confirmed collections come from the evergreen forest of Kerala and the moist deciduous forest of Karnataka in the Western Ghats of southern India. Specimens have been gathered at Silent Valley (Kerala) and Anmod Ghat and other localities in Karnataka, where the lichen grows on the bark of living trees in humid, shaded woodland.
