= Fissurina paradoxica =

Scientific classification
- Domain: Eukaryota
- Kingdom: Fungi
- Division: Ascomycota
- Class: Lecanoromycetes
- Order: Graphidales
- Family: Graphidaceae
- Genus: Fissurina
- Species: F. paradoxica

Binomial name
- Fissurina paradoxica (A.W.Archer) A.W.Archer (2005)

Synonyms
- Graphis paradoxica A.W.Archer (2001)

Species of lichen

Fissurina paradoxica is a species of corticolous (bark-dwelling) script lichen in the family Graphidaceae. Found in Australia, it was formally described as a new species in 2001 by the lichenologist Alan W. Archer, who initially classified it in the genus Graphis. The type specimen was collected in the Buckenbowra River estuary in New South Wales (about 7.5 km west of Batemans Bay), where it was found growing on the bark of a tree along a tidal creek. The species epithet paradoxica ('contrary to expectation') alludes to the unexpected presence of 2-methylpsoromic acid, which, at the time of publication, was the only species in genus Graphis known to contains this lichen product. Archer transferred the taxon to the genus Fissurina in 2005.
