= Fissurina confusa =

Scientific classification
- Kingdom: Fungi
- Division: Ascomycota
- Class: Lecanoromycetes
- Order: Graphidales
- Family: Graphidaceae
- Genus: Fissurina
- Species: F. confusa

Binomial name
- Fissurina confusa Common & Lücking (2011)

Species of lichen-forming fungus

Fissurina confusa is a lichen that forms a thin, crust-like growth on bark and belongs to the family Graphidaceae. It was first described from collections made in Florida. It is distinguished by prominent, lip-like lirellae (slit-like fruiting structures), muriform ascospores (divided into many small compartments), and thallus chemistry dominated by psoromic acid.

== Taxonomy ==
The species was described as new in 2011 by Ralph Common and Robert Lücking. The holotype (the single specimen designated as the name-bearing type; Common 7380D) was collected in April 1997 in Fakahatchee Strand Preserve State Park (Collier County, Florida), along the K2 trail in a second-growth area among royal palms. It is housed in the herbarium of the Michigan State University Museum (MSC).

The epithet confusa refers to the species having been previously confused with Fissurina instabilis. It was separated from F. instabilis by its consistent production of psoromic acid; the type material of F. instabilis lacks detectable lichen substances.

== Description ==
The thallus forms a crust on bark, typically 1–3 cm across and about 50–100 μm thick. It forms a continuous crust with an uneven to warty, blistered (bullate) surface, ranging from yellowish green to olive-brown. The photobiont (the photosynthetic partner) is a trentepohlioid alga (Trentepohlia-type).

The lirellae are straight to curved and usually unbranched (sometimes sparsely branched). They become erumpent (breaking through the thallus surface) and prominent. Individual lirellae are about 0.5–1 mm long and 0.15–0.2 mm wide, with a lateral thalline margin. The disk is partly exposed and often gray-pruinose (with a powdery coating), while the labia are thick and white.

Microscopically, the asci are fusiform (spindle-shaped) and typically contain eight ellipsoid ascospores. The spores are muriform (divided by many internal walls), with about 5–7 transverse rows and 1–3 longitudinal septa, and measure about 25–35 × 12–20 μm. The ascospores are amyloid (I+ violet-blue), meaning they stain in iodine-based tests. Chemically, the thallus contains psoromic acid (major) together with subpsoromic acid (minor) and 2'-O-demethylpsoromic acid (major). The medulla reacts P+ (yellow) in standard spot tests.

=== Similar species ===
Fissurina confusa resembles several bark-dwelling species in the genus that share slit-like lirellae and muriform ascospores. It most closely resembles Fissurina wuyinensis, but differs in having narrower lirellae and the presence of lichen secondary substances. F. wuyinensis has broader lirellae, lacks detectable secondary compounds, and has thinner-walled ascospores. Fissurina confusa may also be mistaken for F. aperta and F. reticulata, which have a broadly similar morphology, but differ in details of the lirellae and ascospores. It can also be separated from F. americana by its more prominent lirellae with a more exposed disk.

== Habitat and distribution ==
Fissurina confusa is known from several collections in Fakahatchee Strand Preserve State Park on branches of hardwoods. Similar material had previously been reported from Brazil under the name Fissurina instabilis; F. confusa was treated as part of a small group of muriform-spored species in the genus that contain psoromic acid.
