= Fissurina isohypocrellina =

Scientific classification
- Kingdom: Fungi
- Division: Ascomycota
- Class: Lecanoromycetes
- Order: Graphidales
- Family: Graphidaceae
- Genus: Fissurina
- Species: F. isohypocrellina

Binomial name
- Fissurina isohypocrellina Aptroot (2022)
- Holotype: Sena Madureira, Brazil

Species of lichen

Fissurina isohypocrellina is a species of corticolous (bark-dwelling), crustose lichen in the family Graphidaceae]. Newly described to science in 2022, it is found in the rainforests of Acre, Brazil. This species is notable within the genus Fissurina genus for the presence of isohypocrellin, a rare secondary metabolite (lichen product) that contributes to its unique wine-red apothecia (the fruiting bodies that produce spores).

== Taxonomy ==
André Aptroot formally described Fissurina isohypocrellina in 2022. The species name reflects the presence of isohypocrellin within its apothecia (fruiting bodies), a characteristic that sets it apart from other Fissurina species. Marcela Cáceres and Aptroot collected the type specimen from the Comunidade Cuidado in the Reserva Extrativista Cazumbá-Iracema (Acre, Brazil) at an elevation of 150 m (490 ft); there it was found growing on bark in a rainforest.

== Description ==
The thallus of Fissurina isohypocrellina is crustose, forming a continuous, thinly corticate, slightly shiny pale greenish-brown layer. It covers areas up to 5 cm (2.0 in) in diameter and is under 0.1 mm thick. The lichen does not form a prothallus (a preliminary growth around and underlying the thallus).

The photobiont (the symbiotic algae providing nutrients through photosynthesis) is trentepohlioid. The ascomata (spore-producing structures) are immersed in the bark, linear, often curved, sometimes branched, and feature wine-red discs with carbonised (blackened) tips.

Chemical testing of the thallus shows no reaction to ultraviolet light, nor to the C, K, KC, and P spot tests, but the presence of isohypocrellin can be confirmed through thin-layer chromatography. This pigment reacts to a potassium hydroxide solution (K) by turning a vivid green, a unique feature among lichens.

== Habitat and distribution ==
This species is exclusively known to grow on tree bark within the primary rainforest of Acre, Brazil.
