= Fissurina platythecioides =

Scientific classification
- Kingdom: Fungi
- Division: Ascomycota
- Class: Lecanoromycetes
- Order: Graphidales
- Family: Graphidaceae
- Genus: Fissurina
- Species: F. platythecioides

Binomial name
- Fissurina platythecioides Rivas Plata & Lücking (2012)

Species of lichen-forming fungus

Fissurina platythecioides is a species of bark-dwelling, crustose lichen-forming fungus in the family Graphidaceae. It is a light green lichen with straight to curved, slit-like fruiting bodies that expose a pale orange-brown disc, known only from lowland tropical rainforest in Madre de Dios, Peru. The species was described in 2012 and is named for its resemblance to species of Platythecium.

== Taxonomy ==
Fissurina platythecioides was described as a new species by Eimy Rivas Plata and Robert Lücking in 2012 from material collected at Los Amigos Research and Training Center (CICRA) in Madre de Dios, Peru. It was introduced in the context of a survey of Graphidaceae at this Amazonian lowland rainforest site. The specific epithet platythecioides alludes to its similarity with some species of Platythecium.

== Description ==
The thallus is crustose and grows on bark. It is light green, continuous, and up to 5 cm (2 in) across, with a thickness of 70–120 μm and a dense cortex. The photobiont is a member of the green algal genus Trentepohlia. The medulla is white, and the photobiont layer lacks crystals except near the fruiting bodies (lirellae).

The lirellae are straight to curved, mostly unbranched, and immersed but gaping, with a complete thalline margin. They measure 0.5–2 mm long and 0.2–0.3 mm wide, with an exposed light orange-brown disc. Ascospores are muriform (divided into multiple chambers by transverse and longitudinal septa), colorless, and 30–50 × 15–20 μm (8 per ascus), and no lichen substances were detected by thin-layer chromatography.

== Habitat and distribution ==
The species is known from the type locality in Amazonian Peru (Madre de Dios), where it was collected at 270 m (890 ft) elevation in tropical lowland rainforest. It was found on the bark of a tree in secondary forest.
