= Fissurina sporolata =

Scientific classification
- Kingdom: Fungi
- Division: Ascomycota
- Class: Lecanoromycetes
- Order: Graphidales
- Family: Graphidaceae
- Genus: Fissurina
- Species: F. sporolata

Binomial name
- Fissurina sporolata B.O.Sharma, Khadilkar & Makhija (2012)

Species of lichen

Fissurina sporolata is a little-known species of corticolous (bark-dwelling), crustose lichen in the family Graphidaceae. Described in 2012 from specimens collected near Hebri in India's Western Ghats, this lichen forms brown, glossy crusts on roadside trees in humid deciduous forests. It is distinguished by its comparatively large ascospores divided into many chambers and its unusually tall spore-producing layer, and remains known only from its original discovery area in southern India.

== Taxonomy ==
Fissurina sporolata is a script lichen (family Graphidaceae) that was formally described as new to science in 2012 by Bharati Sharma, Pradnya Khadilkar and Urmila Makhija. The holotype was collected on 30 December 1980 from Hebri in Karnataka State, India, and is preserved in the Ajrekar Mycological Herbarium (AMH). The species epithet sporolata distinguishes this taxon within the genus' identification key by its comparatively large, many-celled spores.

== Description ==
The lichen forms a brown, glossy thallus (the main lichen body) that is finely cracked and warty. Its fruiting bodies are lirellae—slit-like fissures typical of script lichens—measuring 1.5–3 mm long, usually simple and immersed in the thallus. Internally the lirellae belong to the subcontexta type, meaning the surrounding tissue swells slightly so the slit appears puffed up.

The spore-bearing layer (hymenium) is clear and unusually tall (225–250 μm). Each ascus contains eight colourless, thick-walled ascospores that are muriform—divided by both cross-wise and length-wise walls into many chambers. The spores are ellipsoidal, 42–57 μm long by 17–25 μm wide, and surrounded by a gelatinous halo 5–7 μm thick that shows a faint blue tint when stained with iodine. No lichen products were detected in chemical spot tests.

== Habitat and distribution ==
The species is known only from the Western Ghats of Karnataka, southern India. Both the type and an additional collection were made on the bark of roadside trees within moist deciduous forest near Hebri—a very humid environment strongly influenced by the south-west monsoon.
