= Fissurina submonospora =

Scientific classification
- Kingdom: Fungi
- Division: Ascomycota
- Class: Lecanoromycetes
- Order: Graphidales
- Family: Graphidaceae
- Genus: Fissurina
- Species: F. submonospora

Binomial name
- Fissurina submonospora B.O.Sharma, Khadilkar & Makhija (2012)

Species of lichen

Fissurina submonospora is a species of corticolous (bark-dwelling), crustose lichen in the family Graphidaceae. Described in 2012 from specimens collected in India's Western Ghats, this lichen forms brownish-grey to dark brown crusts on tree bark in moist evergreen forests. It produces large single ascospores divided into brick-like compartments within each reproductive cell, a feature that distinguishes it from most related species which typically contain eight smaller spores.

== Taxonomy ==
Fissurina submonospora is a script lichen in the family Graphidaceae. It was described as new to science in 2012 by Bharati Sharma, Pradnya Khadilkar and Urmila Makhija, who designated a holotype collected on 24 January 1983 from Upper Kodayar, Tamil Nadu. The authors placed the species in Fissurina section dumastii because of its immersed, fissure-like fruit bodies (lirellae) and single-spored asci. They noted that it resembles F. monospora but differs in having markedly smaller ascospores and lacking lichen substances in the thallus.

== Description ==
The thallus (lichen body) forms a brownish-grey to dark-brown crust that cracks and becomes wart-like with age; a dark line (hypothallus) marks its edge. Its lirellae – the narrow, slit-shaped fruiting bodies typical of script lichens – are short (0.5–1.0 mm), straight or slightly branched, and sit flush with the surface. Each lirella is lined by an exciple (the rim) that is orange-brown but not carbonised (i.e., it lacks the black, soot-like strengthening layer seen in some relatives).

Inside, the colourless hymenium (spore-producing layer) is 125–150 micrometres (μm) tall. Every ascus contains a single, very large ascospore (70–100 μm long, occasionally to 130 μm) that is muriform—divided by many cross-walls into brick-like chambers—and surrounded by a gelatinous halo up to 10 μm thick. No secondary metabolites were detected in spot tests or thin-layer chromatography.

== Habitat and distribution ==
The species is known only from the Western Ghats of southern India. Verified collections come from Upper Kodayar (Tamil Nadu), several evergreen-forest localities in Kerala (Silent Valley, Cardamom Hills) and hill forests of Karnataka (Anmod Ghat, Jog Falls, Sringeri-Balehonnur). It grows on the bark of living trees in moist evergreen forest, a habitat characterised by heavy monsoon rainfall and persistent shade.
