= Fissurina immersa =

Scientific classification
- Kingdom: Fungi
- Division: Ascomycota
- Class: Lecanoromycetes
- Order: Graphidales
- Family: Graphidaceae
- Genus: Fissurina
- Species: F. immersa

Binomial name
- Fissurina immersa B.O.Sharma, Khadilkar & Makhija (2012)

Species of lichen

Fissurina immersa is a species of corticolous (bark-dwelling) script lichen in the family Graphidaceae. Described in 2012 from specimens collected near Mudigere in India's Western Ghats, this lichen forms brown, glossy crusts on tree bark in humid evergreen forests. It is distinguished by its slit-like fruiting structures that remain largely embedded in the surface and its unusual spores, which contain only a single large cell divided into brick-like compartments rather than the typical eight smaller spores. The species appears to be endemic to the central-southern Western Ghats and produces norstictic acid, a chemical compound that helps separate it from related species.

== Taxonomy ==
Fissurina immersa is a script lichen in the family Graphidaceae. Bharati Sharma, Pradnya Khadilkar and Urmila Makhija described it in 2012, based on a specimen collected near Mudigere in the Western Ghats of Karnataka, India. The specific epithet, immersa, refers to the way its lirellae (slit-like fruiting bodies) sit largely embedded—or immersed—in the thallus surface. Within Fissurina it belongs to the dumastii-type group, whose members have narrowly acute lirellae with only weak carbonisation of the exciple.

== Description ==
The thallus forms a brown, glossy crust that soon becomes uneven, finely cracked and bordered by a narrow black hypothallus. Scattered across this surface are lirellae 0.2–1.5 mm long, straight to gently curved and pointed at both ends; they share the thallus colour and rise only slightly as the surrounding cortex splits. Their walls (the exciple) remain pale rather than the deep black seen in many graphid lichens, and the internal structure conforms to the dumastii pattern.

Microscopically the hyaline asci each contain a single muriform ascospore—that is, a spore divided into multiple brick-like chambers by three to four cross-walls and a single longitudinal wall—measuring 12–13 × 3–5 micrometres. Chemical spot tests and thin-layer chromatography detect norstictic acid in the thallus, a secondary metabolite that helps distinguish F. immersa from others in the genus lacking lichen products.

== Habitat and distribution ==
All confirmed collections of F. immersa come from the humid evergreen forests of the Western Ghats, with the type material gathered on tree bark in Mudigere (Karnataka). A nationwide checklist records the species only from Karnataka, suggesting that it is endemic to the central-southern Ghats.
