= Fissurina taeniocarpoides =

Scientific classification
- Kingdom: Fungi
- Division: Ascomycota
- Class: Lecanoromycetes
- Order: Graphidales
- Family: Graphidaceae
- Genus: Fissurina
- Species: F. taeniocarpoides

Binomial name
- Fissurina taeniocarpoides Makhija & Adaw. (2007)

Species of lichen

Fissurina taeniocarpoides is a species of script lichen in the family Graphidaceae. Found in India, it was formally described as a new species in 2007 by Urmila Makhija and Bharati Adawadkar. It is characterized by its distinctive ascomata and reddish-orange exciple. Found primarily in tropical and montane forests, this lichen thrives on exposed tree trunks and branches. It has been observed in various locations across India, including the Andaman and Nicobar Islands and the mainland.

This lichen's thallus has a straw-yellow to brownish-green colour and features a smooth to rough texture with a cracked surface. The ascomata are thin, flat, ribbon-like, with intricate branching patterns enclosed by dark orange-red margins. The exciple is non-carbonized, transitioning in colour from bright reddish-orange to dark red, and appears flattened at the apical region. Its ascospores are ellipsoidal, always contain 3 transverse septa, and measure 8–16 by 3–4 μm, with a thick halo. The lichen does not produce any secondary substances.

Fissurina taeniocarpoides is readily distinguishable from other species in genus Fissurina due to the straw-coloured thallus, the intricately branched ascomata with dark orange-red margins, and its reddish-orange to dark red exciple. It closely resembles Fissurina rufula, but can be differentiated by its larger ascospores and striated exciple. Fissurina taeniocarpoides also shares similarities with Fissurina subcontexta, but the major difference lies in the morphology of the ascomata and the exciple's apical region.
