= Fissurina nicobarensis =

Scientific classification
- Kingdom: Fungi
- Division: Ascomycota
- Class: Lecanoromycetes
- Order: Graphidales
- Family: Graphidaceae
- Genus: Fissurina
- Species: F. nicobarensis

Binomial name
- Fissurina nicobarensis B.O.Sharma, Khadilkar & Makhija (2012)

Species of lichen

Fissurina nicobarensis is a rare species of corticolous (bark-dwelling) script lichen in the family Graphidaceae. Described in 2012 from a specimen collected on Great Nicobar Island, this lichen forms yellowish-brown, glossy crusts on tree bark in humid lowland rainforest. It produces numerous branched, slit-like fruiting structures and spores divided into brick-like compartments, and is known only from its original discovery location in the southern Nicobar Islands.

== Taxonomy ==
Fissurina nicobarensis was formally described in 2012 by Bharati Sharma, Pradnya Khadilkar and Urmila Makhija as part of their revision of Indian Graphidaceae. The holotype, collected on 2 January 1987 between Campbell Bay and Lawful Bay on Great Nicobar Island, is housed in the Ajrekar Mycological Herbarium (AMH). The specific epithet nicobarensis refers to the Nicobar Islands where the lichen was discovered.

== Description ==
The lichen's body (thallus) is a yellowish-brown, glossy crust dotted with small warts. Rising from this surface are many branched, slit-like fruiting bodies called lirellae (a type of ascocarp); each lirella is 1–10 mm long, slightly emergent, and belongs to the globulifica-type, characterised by semi-emergent, often branched lirellae and a thin, pale, non-carbonised exciple that is overlaid by the thalline margin. The lirellae's wall (exciple) is thin, pale orange-brown and lacks the black carbonised layer found in some relatives.

Inside, a clear hymenium (the spore-producing layer) stands 62–87 micrometres (μm) tall. Each ascus contains eight colourless ascospores that are submuriform—divided by several cross-walls and one or two longitudinal walls, giving a brick-like appearance—and measure 10–15 μm long by 6–7 μm wide. Every spore is wrapped in a thin gelatinous halo. No lichen secondary metabolites were detected with standard spot tests or thin-layer chromatography.

== Habitat and distribution ==
The species is known to occur only on Great Nicobar Island in the southern Nicobar group (India). It inhabits humid lowland rainforest, growing on the bark of living trees in shaded, wet conditions.
