= Fissurina microcarpa =

Scientific classification
- Kingdom: Fungi
- Division: Ascomycota
- Class: Lecanoromycetes
- Order: Graphidales
- Family: Graphidaceae
- Genus: Fissurina
- Species: F. microcarpa

Binomial name
- Fissurina microcarpa B.O.Sharma, Khadilkar & Makhija (2012)

Species of lichen

Fissurina microcarpa is a little-known species of corticolous (bark-dwelling) script lichen in the family Graphidaceae. Described in 2012 from specimens collected in the Western Ghats of southern India, this lichen is distinguished by its exceptionally small, cinnamon-brown fruiting structures and unusual spores. Unlike most related species that produce eight spores per reproductive cell, this lichen produces only a single large spore divided into many brick-like compartments. It grows on tree bark in humid hill forests and is known only from two locations in Tamil Nadu and Karnataka.

== Taxonomy ==
Fissurina microcarpa was described from the Western Ghats of southern India; the holotype was collected on 24 January 1983 from Upper Kodayar in Tamil Nadu. The specific epithet microcarpa ('with small fruit-bodies') alludes to the species' unusually tiny lirellae (the slit-like fruiting bodies characteristic of many script lichens).

== Description ==
The thallus of F. microcarpa forms a brown, glossy crust that becomes cracked and warted as it ages. Across this surface develop plentiful lirellae: minute, cinnamon-brown fissures measuring 0.1–0.4 mm long that may stay simple or fork into short branches. Each lirella is immersed at first, then rises slightly as the surrounding cortex swells and splits; its walls (the exciple) are pale orange-brown and lack the blackened carbon layer (carbonisation) seen in some relatives.

Internally the colourless hymenium (spore-producing tissue) stands 112–150 μm tall, and the asci are distinctive in containing a single ascospore rather than the usual eight. That spore is large (87–125 μm long), muriform—divided into many brick-like chambers by both cross-wise and length-wise septa—and wrapped in a gelatinous halo 5–8 μm thick that becomes visible in water mounts. Chemical spot tests show the presence of stictic acid; this secondary metabolite helps separate the species from superficially similar taxa that lack lichen products.

== Habitat and distribution ==
Fissurina microcarpa is known only from two localities in the central and southern Western Ghats of India: the type locality at Upper Kodayar, Tamil Nadu, and an additional site near Sringeri–Balehonnur in Karnataka. Both lie within humid evergreen or semi-evergreen hill forests that receive heavy monsoon rainfall. The lichen grows on the bark of living trees in shaded, mossy situations.
