= Fissurina pseudostromatica =

Scientific classification
- Kingdom: Fungi
- Division: Ascomycota
- Class: Lecanoromycetes
- Order: Graphidales
- Family: Graphidaceae
- Genus: Fissurina
- Species: F. pseudostromatica

Binomial name
- Fissurina pseudostromatica Lücking & Rivas Plata (2011)

Species of lichen-forming fungus

Fissurina pseudostromatica is a lichen that forms a thin, crust-like growth on bark and belongs to the family Graphidaceae. It was first described from subtropical Florida. It forms pale clusters of very small, immersed lirellae (slit-like fruiting structures) that look like tiny stromata, and standard chemical screening (thin-layer chromatography) did not detect any lichen substances. It has since been reported from Brazil and from Yunnan in southern China.

== Taxonomy ==
Fissurina pseudostromatica was described as a new species in 2011 by Robert Lücking and Eimy Rivas Plata, based on a collection made in Fakahatchee Strand Preserve State Park (Collier County, Florida). The holotype (the single specimen designated as the name-bearing type; Lücking & Rivas Plata 26512) was collected in March 2009 along Janes Scenic Drive (west of the old tram) in a Taxodium–Sabal hardwood hammock. It is deposited in the Field Museum herbarium (F). The epithet pseudostromatica refers to the conspicuous, stroma-like clusters formed by the aggregated lirellae (giving a "false stroma" appearance). The material was initially identified as Fissurina mexicana, but it was separated because F. mexicana has muriform ascospores (divided into many small compartments) and a less strongly contrasting thallus pattern.

A later study using morphology and anatomy, chemical tests (spot tests and thin-layer chromatography), and DNA data from three gene regions (ITS, nuLSU, mtSSU) reported the species as new for China based on collections from Yunnan. In that analysis, not all specimens identified as Fissurina pseudostromatica grouped together, suggesting that the species may be defined too broadly and may need re-evaluation.

== Description ==
The thallus grows on bark and is typically 1–3 cm across and about 40–60 μm (micrometers) thick. It forms a continuous crust with a smooth to slightly uneven, olive-green surface, and contains a trentepohlioid photobiont (Trentepohlia-type alga). In cross-section, the upper cortex is prosoplectenchymatous, with an irregular algal layer and scattered clusters of crystals.

The lirellae are densely aggregated into small, white clusters that give a pseudostromatic appearance. Individual lirellae are straight to curved, unbranched, and immersed, with a thin thalline margin. Individual lirellae are about 0.1–0.3 mm long and about 0.1 mm wide and high. The disk is concealed to slightly gaping, while the labia are inconspicuous and white. Microscopically, the asci are fusiform (60–80 × 10–15 μm) and contain eight ellipsoid ascospores. The spores are 3-septate (divided by three internal walls), about 15–20 × 5–7 μm, and non-amyloid (I–). No lichen substances were detected by thin-layer chromatography. Material reported from China was described as matching the type material in overall morphology and chemistry, but with broader ascospores (reported as 7–11 μm wide rather than 5–7 μm). A K+ thallus reaction was also reported, despite no secondary metabolites being detected by thin-layer chromatography.

=== Similar species ===
Fissurina pseudostromatica is most similar to Fissurina fuscoculba, a species described from New Caledonia that also develops aggregated groups of immersed lirellae that look pseudostromatic. The two species differ in several consistent features: F. fuscoculba has a brown to yellowish-brown thallus and a well-developed pseudostroma with distinct peridermal layers, whereas F. pseudostromatica has a paler thallus and only a superficial pseudostromatic appearance, with aggregated lirellae that lack true stromatic tissue. In addition, F. fuscoculba differs in ascospore dimensions and internal anatomy, supporting their separation despite superficial resemblance.

== Habitat and distribution ==
The species was originally known from the type collection in Fakahatchee Strand Preserve State Park in southwestern Florida, where it was found on hardwood branches in a Taxodium–Sabal hardwood hammock associated with slough and strand habitats. It has since been reported from tropical lowland rainforest localities in Yunnan (southern China), where it grows on bark, and it is also reported from Brazil.
