= Patricia Weerakoon =

Australian Christian sexologist

Patricia Kamalini Weerakoon is an Australian Christian sexologist.

Weerakoon was born in a Tamil Christian family in Sri Lanka, and grew up on a tea plantation. She is married to Vasantha and they have a son, Kamal, who is a Presbyterian minister. She studied medicine at the University of Colombo, and after her marriage, she moved with her family to Hawaii, where she undertook postgraduate studies at the University of Hawaii. She later obtained a further degree from the University of New South Wales.

Weerakoon has worked as a lecturer at the University of Colombo and the University of Sydney. She has written a number of popular books, including Teen Sex By the Book (2013), Growing Up By the Book (2014) and The Best Sex for Life (2016). Teen Sex By the Book created controversy in 2015 when it was mistakenly thought to be included in the Special Religious Education curriculum in New South Wales government schools. The lobby group Fairness in Religion in Schools said the book contained "dangerous anti-gay and anti-divorce messages", and called on the NSW Department of Education to ban the book. The Minister for Education, Adrian Piccoli, initially placed a ban on Teen Sex By the Book before acknowledging that it had never been a part of the SRE curriculum.

In July 2017, Weerakoon released a series of six books for children, entitled Birds and Bees by the Book, with each book focusing on a different aspect of sexuality. The series is aimed for parents to open up the conversation with children in a safe environment.

A reviewer of her latest book notes that "Conversations about sex can be awkward" and that "Dr Weerakoon's helpful breakdown of different ages and stages of discussion make me feel ready to begin teaching my daughter now about the great way God designed her body and lay a good foundation for the future."

Weerakoon teaches that "sex and the wonder of human genitalia are gifts from God that should be celebrated". Weerakoon looks at sexual ethics from a Christian worldview and speaks to Christian schools on the topic as well as speaking at conferences on Christian education.

== Bibliography ==
- Books published
- Academic works
