= Fissurina verrucosa =

Scientific classification
- Kingdom: Fungi
- Division: Ascomycota
- Class: Lecanoromycetes
- Order: Graphidales
- Family: Graphidaceae
- Genus: Fissurina
- Species: F. verrucosa

Binomial name
- Fissurina verrucosa Makhija & Adaw. (2007)

Species of lichen

Fissurina verrucosa is a species of corticolous (bark-dwelling) script lichen in the family Graphidaceae. Found in Karnataka, India, it was formally described as a new species in 2007 by Urmila Makhija and Bharati Adawadkar. This species is characterized by its yellowish-brown and slightly glossy appearance. Its thallus has a cracked, uneven, and verrucose texture.

The ascomata of Fissurina verrucosa are lirelline and very short, ranging from 0.2 to 0.3 mm in length. They feature simple to branched structures with short branches that are the same colour as the thallus. These structures are found in scattered patches, immersed within the thallus. The hymenium is hyaline and measures between 26 and 138 μm in height. The ascospores are ellipsoidal, measure 7–12 μm by 3–4 μm, and contain 3 septa.

In terms of chemistry, the thallus contains protocetraric and fumarprotocetraric acids, which sets it apart from other "comparilis-type" species in the genus Fissurina. These other species, including Fissurina comparilis, F. comparimuralis, F. humilis, F. inquinata, and F. tachygrapha, either have no lichen substances or contain stictic acid, as in the case of F. inquinata. Fissurina verrucosa is also distinguishable by its smaller ascospores.

This lichen species has been observed growing on exposed tree trunks in montane forests along the roadside. The first specimen examined (the type specimen, collected in 1974) was initially reported as Graphis dumastii but later identified as Fissurina verrucosa.
