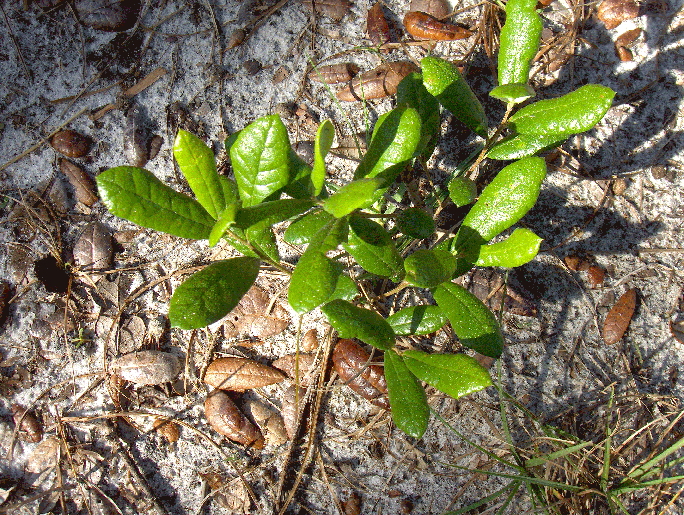

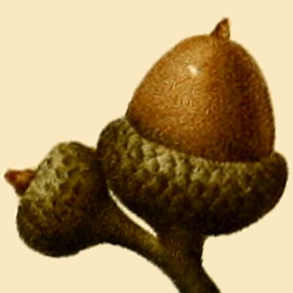

Conservation status
- Least Concern (IUCN 3.1)

- Apparently Secure (NatureServe)

Scientific classification
- Kingdom: Plantae
- Clade: Embryophytes
- Clade: Tracheophytes
- Clade: Spermatophytes
- Clade: Angiosperms
- Clade: Eudicots
- Clade: Rosids
- Order: Fagales
- Family: Fagaceae
- Genus: Quercus
- Subgenus: Quercus subg. Quercus
- Section: Quercus sect. Lobatae
- Species: Q. pumila

Binomial name
- Quercus pumila Walter
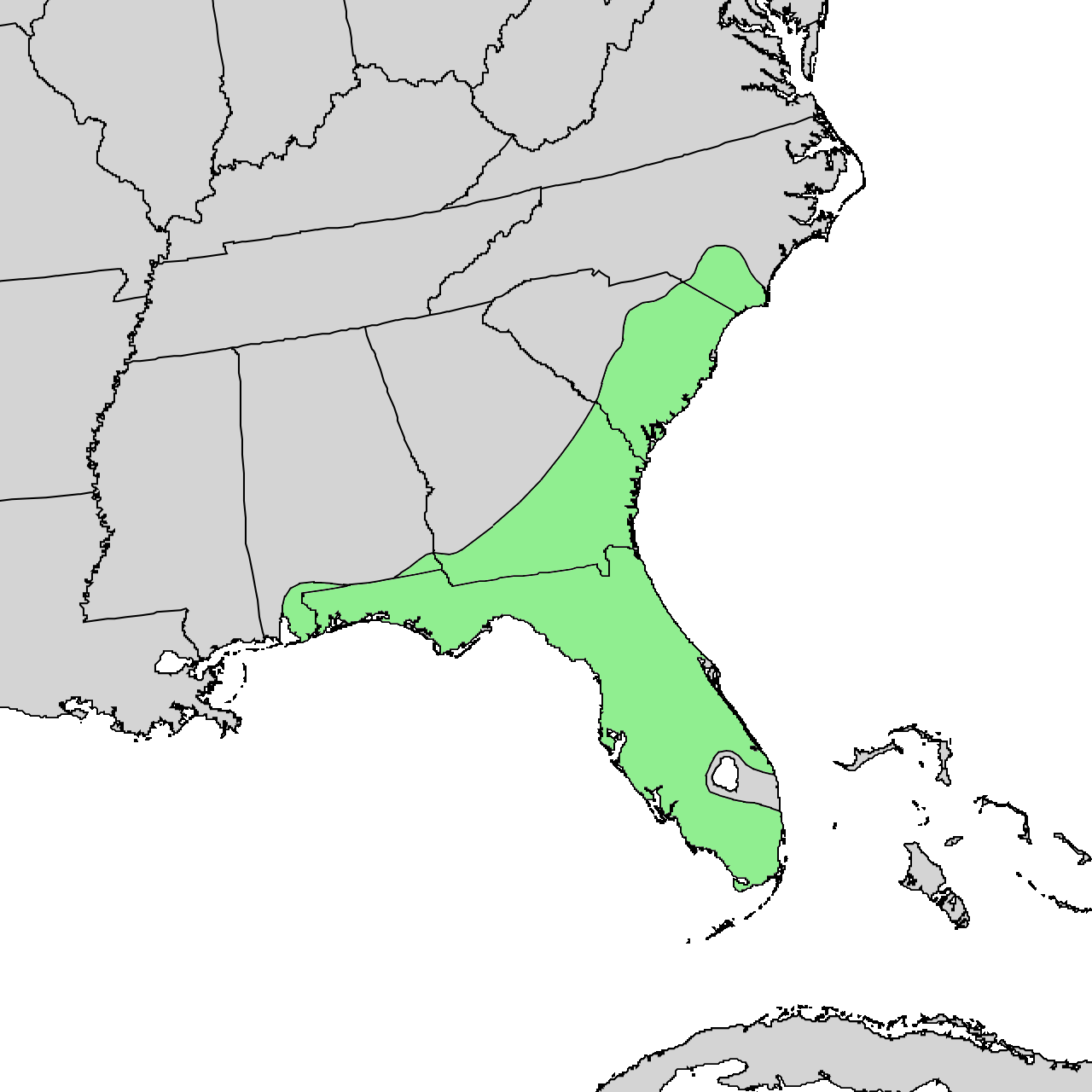
- Natural range

Synonyms
- List: Quercus cinerea var. pumila (Walter) Curtis; Quercus phellos var. pumila (Walter) Michx.; Cyclobalanopsis sericea (Aiton) Schottky; Quercus cinerea var. nana A.DC.; Quercus elliottii Wilbur; Quercus phellos var. sericea Aiton; Quercus pumila var. sericea (Aiton) Engelm.; Quercus sericea (Aiton) Willd.

= Quercus pumila =

Species of oak tree

Quercus pumila, the runner oak or running oak, is a species of oak. It is native to the southeastern United States (Mississippi, Alabama, Florida, Georgia, and the Carolinas).

Quercus pumila is a deciduous shrub usually less than one meter (3 feet 3 inches) tall. The bark is gray or dark brown. The leaves are up to 10 centimetres (4 in) long, with no teeth or lobes, hairless or nearly so on the upper surface, the underside usually with a thick coat of reddish-brown hairs.

This species can be found in habitats such as pine flatwoods, pinelands of various types, and longleaf pine-oak stands. It can also be found in disturbed areas, such as along roadsides.
