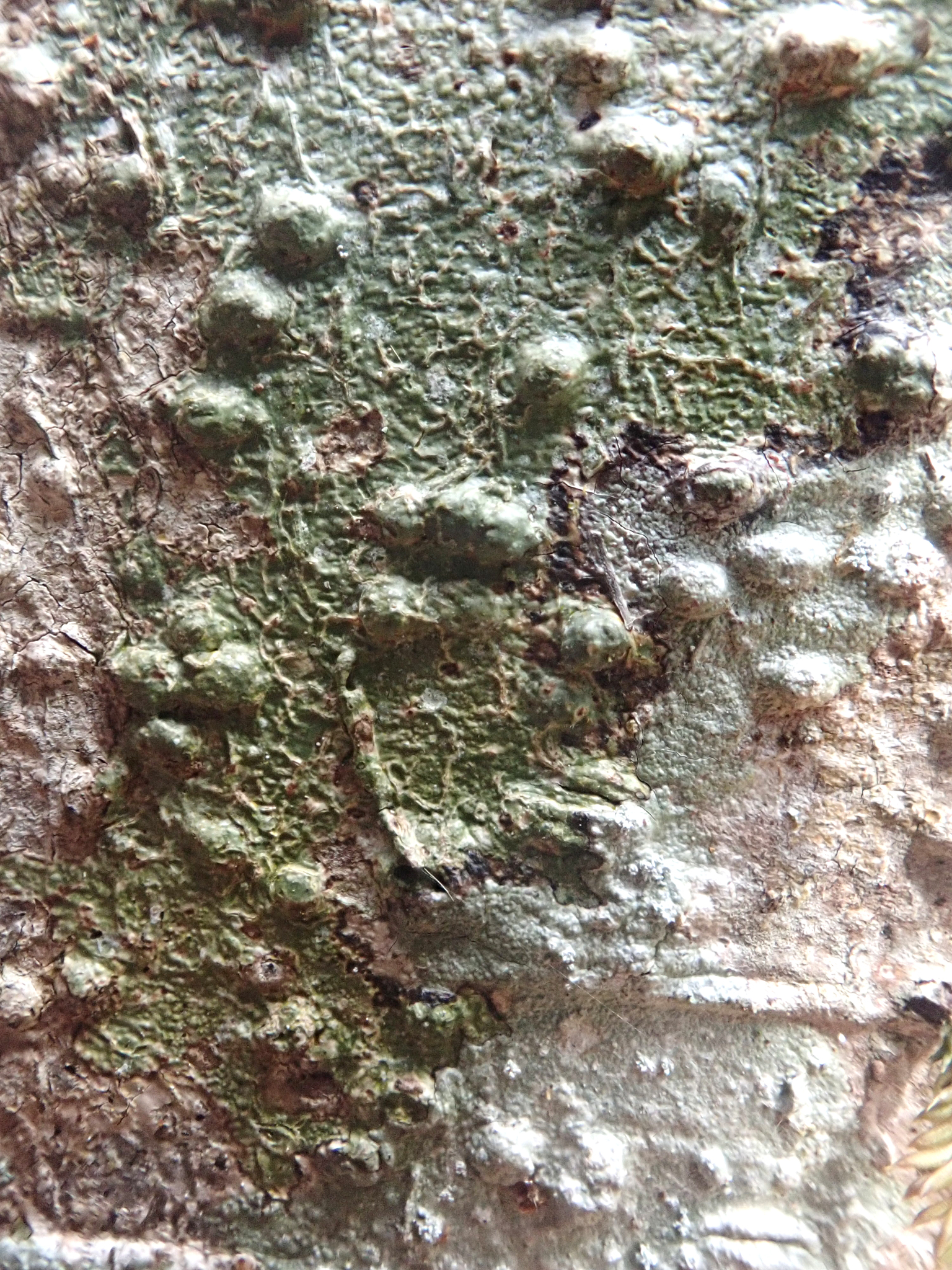
- Fissurina dumastii on the bark of a kahikatea tree in Manurewa, Auckland, New Zealand

Scientific classification
- Domain: Eukaryota
- Kingdom: Fungi
- Division: Ascomycota
- Class: Lecanoromycetes
- Order: Graphidales
- Family: Graphidaceae
- Genus: Fissurina
- Species: F. dumastii

Binomial name
- Fissurina dumastii Fée

Synonyms
- Synonymy: Fissurina glauca (Müll. Arg.) Staiger, Biblioth.; Graphis dumastii (Fée) Spreng.; Graphis glauca Müll. Arg.

= Fissurina dumastii =

Species of lichen

Fissurina dumastii is a species of lichenised fungi in the family Graphidaceae. It has a pantropical distribution, and was formally described in 1824 by Antoine Laurent Apollinaire Fée.

== Description ==
Fissurina dumastii has a green thallus, and a smooth, glossy appearance, and an inconspicuous ascomata.

== Taxonomy ==
The species was first described by Antoine Laurent Apollinaire Fée in 1824.

== Distribution ==
The species has a Pantropical distribution, and in 2017 was first identified as being present in Manurewa, Auckland, New Zealand.
