= Fakahatchee Strand =

Natural area in Florida, USA

Coordinates: 26°00′40″N 81°25′22″W

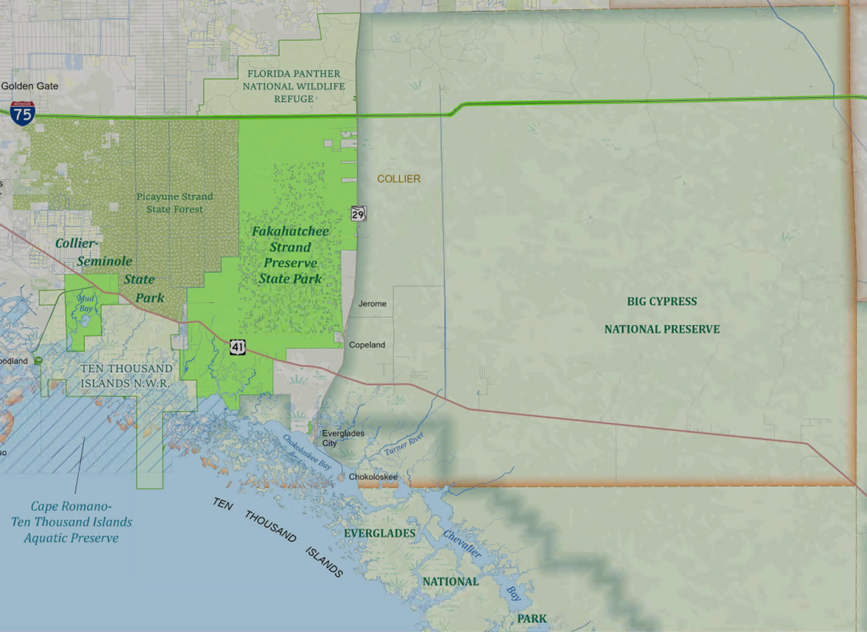
Map showing relationship of Fakahatchee Strand (green) to other protected areas in the Big Cypress Swamp

The Fakahatchee Strand (Mikasuki Fakahatchee, meaning "muddy creek") is a strand swamp in Collier County, Florida. It is the largest and best known strand swamp and hosts a large variety of plants in several diverse habitats. The Fakahatchee Strand is in the Big Cypress Swamp, but not in the national preserve. It has a tropical climate and hosts both temperate and tropical plants. In many parts it resembles a tropical rainforest.

The Fakahatchee used to be dominated by bald cypress trees. In the mid-20th century almost all of the mature cypress trees in the strand, as well as in the rest of the Big Cypress Swamp, were logged out. Attempts to drain wetlands to allow residential and commercial development during the 20th century lowered the water levels in the strand. Remediation efforts starting in the 1970s have partially restored water levels in the strand. Most of the Fakahatchee Strand has been protected in the Fakahatchee Strand Preserve State Park since the 1970s. The northern part of the Fakahatchee Strand is protected in the Florida Panther National Wildlife Refuge.

The Fakahatchee Strand hosts a large number of vascular plants and lichens, more than half of which are tropical. It hosts several species found nowhere else in the contiguous United States, and a number of rare species or subspecies. Many plants and animals found in the Fakahatchee are classified as endangered or otherwise threatened. Well known rare species found in the Fakahatchee Strand include the Florida panther and the ghost orchid.

== Location ==
Most of the Fakahatchee Strand is in the Fakahatchee Strand Preserve State Park, which covers about 125 square miles (320 km^{2}) from Alligator Alley (I-75) south to the Ten Thousand Islands in Collier County. The northern end of the strand (north of Alligator Alley) is in the Florida Panther National Wildlife Refuge. The state park includes mangrove forests and salt marshes south of the Tamiami Trail (US 41) which are not part of the Fakahatchee Strand. The state park is 35 miles (56 km) southeast of Naples and 80 miles (130 km) west of Miami. The eastern boundary of the state park is along or close to Florida State Road 29 and just west of the Big Cypress National Preserve. While the Fakahatchee Strand is part of the Big Cypress Swamp, it is not in the national preserve, but has been designated by the state of Florida as part of the Big Cypress Area of Critical State Concern. The Picayune Strand State Forest, also part of the Big Cypress Swamp, is adjacent to the Fakahatchee Strand Preserve State Park to the west.

== Description ==
The Fakahatchee Strand is the largest strand swamp in the world. It contains the most diverse collection of native orchids and bromeliads in the United States. It hosts five plant species that are found nowhere else in the United States. The strand has the largest number of native (Florida) royal palms in the United States and contains most of the only royal palm and bald cypress forest in the world. It also has many other rare plants and animals. The Fakahatchee Strand more closely resembles a rainforest of the Neotropical realm than anywhere else in the continental United States. It has a high density of rare plants and the highest diversity of epiphytic ferns, bromeliads, peperomias, and orchids in the continental United States.

The climate in the Fakahatchee Strand is tropical. Annual rainfall ranges from 35 to 80 inches (890 to 2,030 mm), averaging 55 inches (1,400 mm) in the strand. Eighty percent of the annual rain falls in May through September. The coldest month is January with a mean temperature of 65 °F (18 °C). The hottest month is August with a mean temperature of 82 °F (28 °C). There are occasional freezes. Evapotranspiration in the strand is about 54 inches (1,400 mm) per year. The high evapotranspiration rate is due to the low relief, slow drainage, retention of water in the interior, and the high mean temperature of the strand.

The elevation of the Fakahatchee Strand is between 5 and 15 feet (1.5 and 4.6 m) above mean sea level (msl). The strand is underlain by the limestone Tamiami Formation, which is exposed near the southern end of the strand, along the Tamiami Trail. Limestone creates a karst landscape. The sloughs, in which the stand forests exist, are karst features, linear solution depressions created by selective dissolution of the limestone. The limestone ls covered by thin soils of sand, sandy marl, clay, and fine shell fragments. Prior to drainage in the 20th century, soils were in direct content with or close to the water table. Organic material in the soil produces acids which dissolve limestone. A few deep sinkholes are located in the area of the strand. Deep Lake, which is near the Fakahatchee Strand, is 97 feet (30 m) deep. A peat deposit in the southern part of the strand is 6 feet (1.8 m) deep, and originated in 5200 Before Present (BP).

As of 2011 the Preserve was described as largely covered by mature secondary forests. The Fakahatchee Strand has a high diversity of vascular plants because it hosts both tropical (West Indian) and temperate flora.

== History ==
=== Early ===
There are many archaeological sites in the Fakahatchee Strand, primarily Glades culture shell middens and mounds that may have been camping sites for people of the Glades culture. Seminoles took refuge in the Fakahatchee Strand during and after the Second and Third Seminole wars.

The Fakahatchee Strand first came to notice of botanists in the mid-19th century for the reported presence of royal palm trees. Some attempts were made to reach royal palm hammocks in the second half of 19th century. Further excursions by botanists into the Fakahatchee Strand came in the early 20th century.

=== Logging ===
Almost all of the mature bald cypress trees in the Fakahatchee Strand (and elsewhere in the Big Cypress Swamp) were logged in the late 1940s and early 1950s, yielding five billion board feet of lumber. The Three Mile Swamp and Big Cypress Bend were the only parts of the Fakahatchee Strand in which bald cypress trees were not logged.

Narrow-gauge railroads were laid temporarily in the Fakahatchee and throughout the Big Cypress Swamp to aid in removing the cypress logs. Roadbeds for the lines were created with material dug out of borrow canals flanking the roadbeds. These roadbeds, commonly called "trams" in the Big Cypress Swamp, were 15 feet wide and two or three feet high. A main rail line, the East Main Tram, extended north–south up the center of the Fakahatchee strand. Branch trams extended about 1 mile (1.6 km) to the east and west of the main line. The branch trams were 1,650 feet (500 m) apart. Felled trees were pulled by chain to the nearest tram to be loaded on rail cars. The logs tore down other trees and dug up the ground as they were pulled along. Much of the other vegetation was destroyed or disturbed by the operations, removing the tree canopy. The ground exposed by the logging dried out and wildfires burned into the strand. One report counted over 10,000 royal palm trees destroyed, and said that orchid crowns big enough to fill a car were dumped into water.

The trams have become linear hammocks, supporting trees typically found in mesic hammocks, including laurel oak (Quercus laurifolia), cabbage palm (Sabal palmetto), swamp bay (Persea palustris), royal palm, myrsine (Myrsine cubana), marlberry (Ardisia escallonioides), sweet bay (Magnolia virginiana), gumbo limbo (Bursera simaruba), Simpson's stopper (Myrcianthes fragrans), willow bustic (Sideroxylon salicifolium), and satinleaf (Chrysophyllum oliviforme). Southward flowing water in the strand accumulates in the borrow canal on the north side of each tram. The water eventually drains through "washouts", gaps in the trams, spaced about 1,000 feet (300 m) apart. The washouts were left to prevent the water on the north side from overtopping the trams, and were bridged to carry the railroad over them.

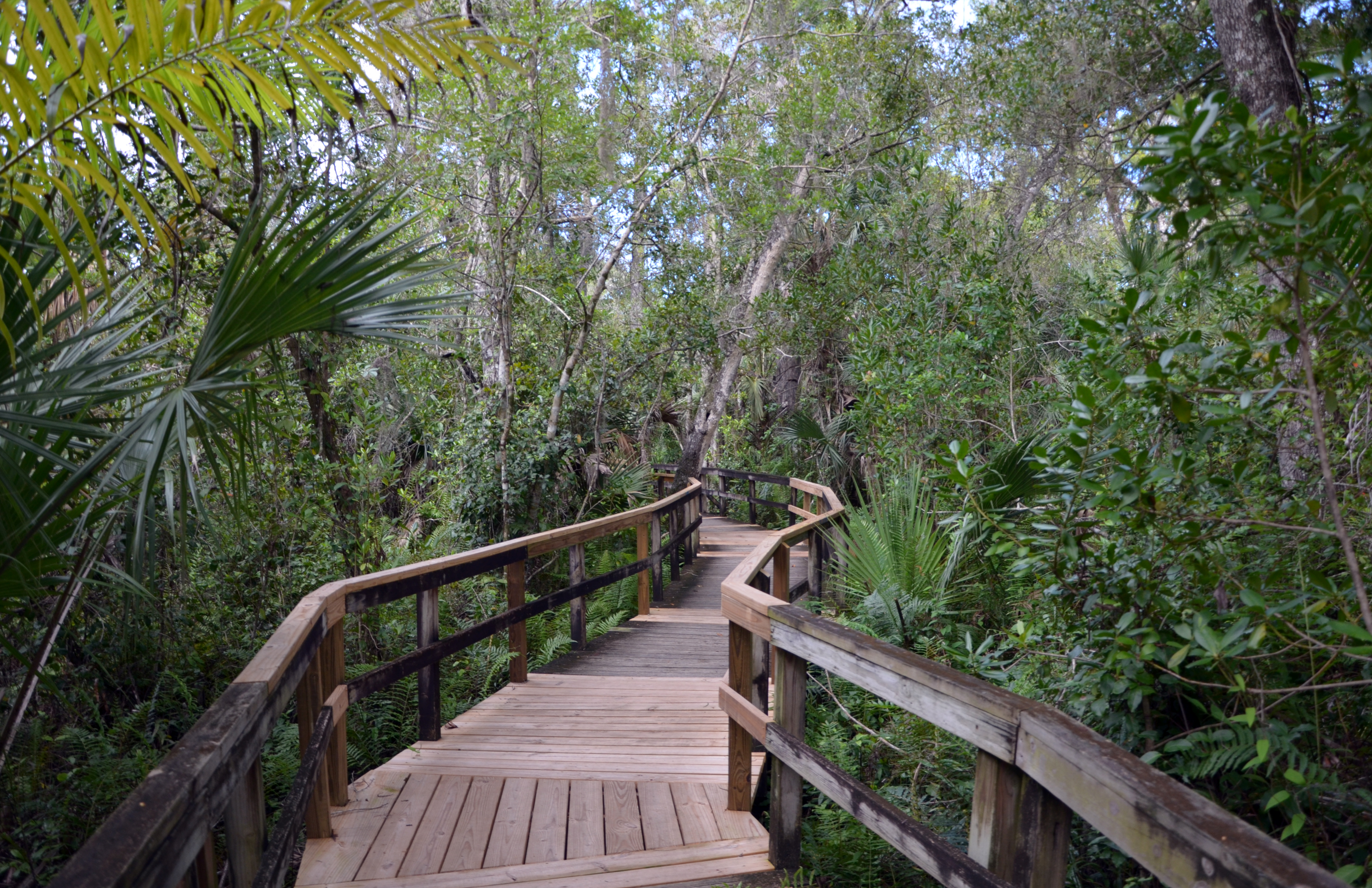
Boardwalk in the Big Cypress Bend

Big Cypress Bend, which, with the Corkscrew Swamp Sanctuary, is one of just two areas in Florida in which large bald cypress trees were not logged off, has a 2,500-foot (760 m) long boardwalk through the old growth cypress trees. The Janes Memorial Scenic Drive is a dirt road on trams that allows motor vehicles access to the interior of the Fakahatchee State Park. Hiking trails in the state park are also on trams.

=== Hunting and agriculture ===
Hunters used swamp buggies to penetrate the Big Cypress, damaging the marl prairies adjacent to the strands. Hunting cabins were built in the Big Cypress Swamp, including in the Fakahatchee. There are still hunting cabins, both abandoned and in use, in the Fakahatchee Strand. Orchids were also frequently collected from the strand. Deep Lake Prairie on the eastern edge of the Fakahatchee just north of Copeland was used for vegetable farming for much of the 20th century, but had returned to wet prairie by 1990.

=== Development and preservation ===
The Gulf American Land Corporation started developing the Golden Gate Estates in the 1950s in the Picayune Strand west of the Fakahatchee Strand after the cypress trees had been logged out. Gulf America bought the Fakahatchee Strand from a lumber company in 1966 and began selling lots in unsurveyed swampland that they called Bermuda Ranch Grants. The company dug a network of drainage canals, the Faka Union Canal system, to drain the swamps. The lowered water label allowed several big wildfires to spread in Collier County in the 1970s, including one that burned almost one-quarter of Collier County and most of the Fakahatchee Strand.

Attempts were made in 1948 and 1964 to protect the Fakahatchee Strand, without success. The Florida state government began negotiations with Gulf America in 1972 to purchase 75,000 acres (300 km^{2}) of land in the strand that the company had bought in 1966. In the meantime, Gulf American was prosecuted for illegal dredge and fill operations at Cape Coral and paid the court-ordered damages in 1974 by turning land over to the state, including the Fakahatchee Strand. Florida began buying private holdings in the strand, but their locations were often uncertain because the land had not been surveyed.

== Hydrology ==
The Fakahatchee originally received most of its flowing water from the Okaloacoochee Slough, which runs 40 miles (64 km) from the Devil's Garden in Hendry County to just east of the north end of the Fakahatchee Strand in what is now the Florida Panther National Wildlife Refuge, north of Alligator Alley. The Barron River Canal (the borrow pit for State Road 29) intercepts the slough, and diverts water from the Fakahatchee. The amount of water from the slough diverted from the Fakahatchee by the canal has been reduced by the installation of water control structures. Several culverts have also been placed under State Road 29 to permit water to flow from the Barron River Canal into the Fakahatchee.

Water usually flows across the surface (sheet flow in the Fakahatchee Strand. The flow is heaviest from June to October, but may stop entirely late in the dry season, and all water can disappear from the surface during droughts. The surface flow may reach as high as 0.03 feet (0.0091 m) per second or 0.5 miles (0.80 km) per day. Most of the strand is underwater during the wet season, but may largely dry out during the winter in drier years. The bedrock is primarily limestone, and outcrops rarely rise high enough to remain above the water level year-round. The east–west oriented trams in the strand hold back the water, helping to maintain water levels even with the reduced post-drainage flow through the strand. There are chains of sinkhole lakes in the strand that are connected by shallow channels that may dry up in the winter.

Three rivers drain the lower end of Fakahatchee Strand. The Fakahatchee River flows from the Big Cypress Bend (which at one time was called "Fakahatchee") to Fakahatchee Bay in the Ten Thousand Islands. The East River flows from the lower end of the main strand to Fakahatchee Bay. The Ferguson River flows from near the Three Mile Swamp to West Pass Bay in the Ten Thousand Islands. Water from the eastern side of the strand also flows into the Barron River Canal which empties into Chokoloskee Bay.

The Fakahatchee is underlain by a shallow, non-artesian, surficial aquifer. The aquifer is recharged by rainfall. The construction of drainage canals to both the east and the west of the Fakahatchee drew down the ground water level in the Fakahatchee, particularly during the dry season. Control structures in the canals have raised the ground water level in the Fakahatche, although not to pre-drainage levels. The communities of Everglades City, Copeland, Lee Cypress, Chokoloskee, and Plantation use the superficial aquifer for their water supply.

== Habitats ==
=== Types ===
The Fakahatchee Strand contains a complex mosaic of habitats that are not easily separated. The dominant habitats are swamps of many types and wet prairies. Many of the habitats include successional and intermediate stages.

Mixed swamps or strand swamps have a mixed swamp core at a low ground level surrounded by a fringe of cypress trees on higher ground. The higher ground can dry out, subjecting the cypress fringe to occasional fires. Mixed swamps typically include one or more of Taxodium distichum (bald cypress), Annona glabra (pond apple), Fraxinus caroliniana (pop ash), Salix caroliniana (coastal plain willow), and/or Acer rubrum (red maple). Salix and Acer are commonly found together, as are Annona and Fraxinus. Such associations are rarely exclusive, and other combinations are present. Mixed swamps are found in the deepest parts of strands, dominating the main strand and are also found in many small strands. As the ground surface is uneven, the mix of species may vary over distances of a few feet. There are also differences between the deepest and peripheral parts of a strand.

Cypress transitional swamps are dominated by bald cypress, and are usually transitioning to another type of swamp. Transitional swamps that have not burned in a while tend to expand and to have more species of trees, becoming a mixed swamp. Transitional swamps that have burned frequently tend to shrink and transition to wet prairies.

Willow/Maple swamps primarily are areas that been burned over. In 1990 Austin, Jones & Bennett believed these swamps had burned following the logging operations of the late 1940s and early 1950s. At that time (1990) the swamps were observed to be adding species, and to be at an early stage in the transition to the climax community of a mixed swamp.

Wet prairies commonly include Bacopa species (water hyssop), Crinum americanum (Florida swamp lilly), Coreopsis leavenworthii (Leavenworth's tickseed), Eleocharis species (spikerush), Eriocaulon decangulare (ten-angled pipewort), Flaveria linearis (narrowleaf yellowtops), Hyptis alata (musky mint), Juncus species (rushes), Lachnanthes caroliniana (Carolina redroot), Pluchea rosea (camphorweed), Rhynchospora species (beak-rush), Utricularia species (bladderworts), and Xyris species (yellow eyed grasses). Marshes are dominated by Typha species (cattails), with Cladium jamaicense (swamp sawgrass) and Juncus species present.

Pine islands are found in wet prairies. Plants on the pine islands include Pinus elliottii (slash pine), Sabal palmetto (cabbage pakm), Ludwigia species (primrose-willow), Myrica cerifera (southern wax myrtle), Kosteletzkya pentacarpos (seashore mallow), and Baccharis species. Hammocks are dominated by Ficus species (figs), Quercus species (oaks), Sabal palmetto, Roystonea elata (royal palm), Persea borbonia (redbay), Ilex cassine (dahoon holly), and Chrysobalanus icaco (cocoplums). Some low hammocks are more like tropical hardwood hammocks with species from the West Indies present, while others grade into mixed swamp. "Head" is a term used in Florida for a stand of trees surrounded by lower vegetation that is dominated by one species. Individual heads in the Fakahatchee are dominated by oaks, cypress, willows, popash, or pines. Heads are not ecologically stable, and may change composition rapidly, especially after a fire.

Other habitats in the Fakahatchee Strand include mesic flatwoods, prairie mesic hammocks, rockland hammocks, shell mounds, wet flatwoods, dome swamps, glades marshes, marl prairies, pond apple sloughs, marsh lakes, and swamp lakes.

=== Changes ===
Areas that were wet prairies in the 1940s had become cypress swamps by 1990. One area called Twelve Mile Prairie in 1947 had become the Willow/Maple Swamp in 1990. Most large cypress trees were logged out but cypress trees have increased in some areas from seedlings.

Popash, pond apple, and mixed popash/pond apple stands were bypassed by loggers. The stands are not uniform. Stands that have burned over tend to have more popash present, while parts of stands in deeper water have more pond apples. Some of the stands have old hollow cypress trees, which the loggers left because hollow trees had no value for lumber.

Before human intervention, pinelands and prairies adjacent to the Fakahatchee Strand burned every two to seven years, but the strand was itself protected by moist margins. Starting in the 19th century, Seminoles and, later, white settlers burned the pinelands and prairies to promote fresh grass for grazing animals. After the cypress trees were logged out in the mid-20th century, severe fires burned parts of the strand.

== Flora ==
The Fakahatchee Strand has been described as the "most botanically rich area of the Big Cypress" and "by far the best known and ... one of the most noted botanical areas in Florida". Austin, Jones,and Bennett published a list of 477 species of vascular plants that were found in Fakahatchee in the 1980s, including 18 families of non-flowering plants and 101 families of flowering plants. As of 2025, the Floristic Inventory of South Florida listed 529 species of plants present in the Fakahatchee Strand. There is a strong tropical presence in the flora; 69% of the trees, 88% of the orchids, and 86% of the ferns in the Fakahatchee are tropical. The tropical plants are mixed with temperate species. There are no tropical ecological communities in the Fakahatchee. The Fakahatchee has the greatest diversity and density of orchids in North America, the highest number of bromeliad species of any location in the US, and the second-highest number of native ferns in Florida.

=== Trees ===
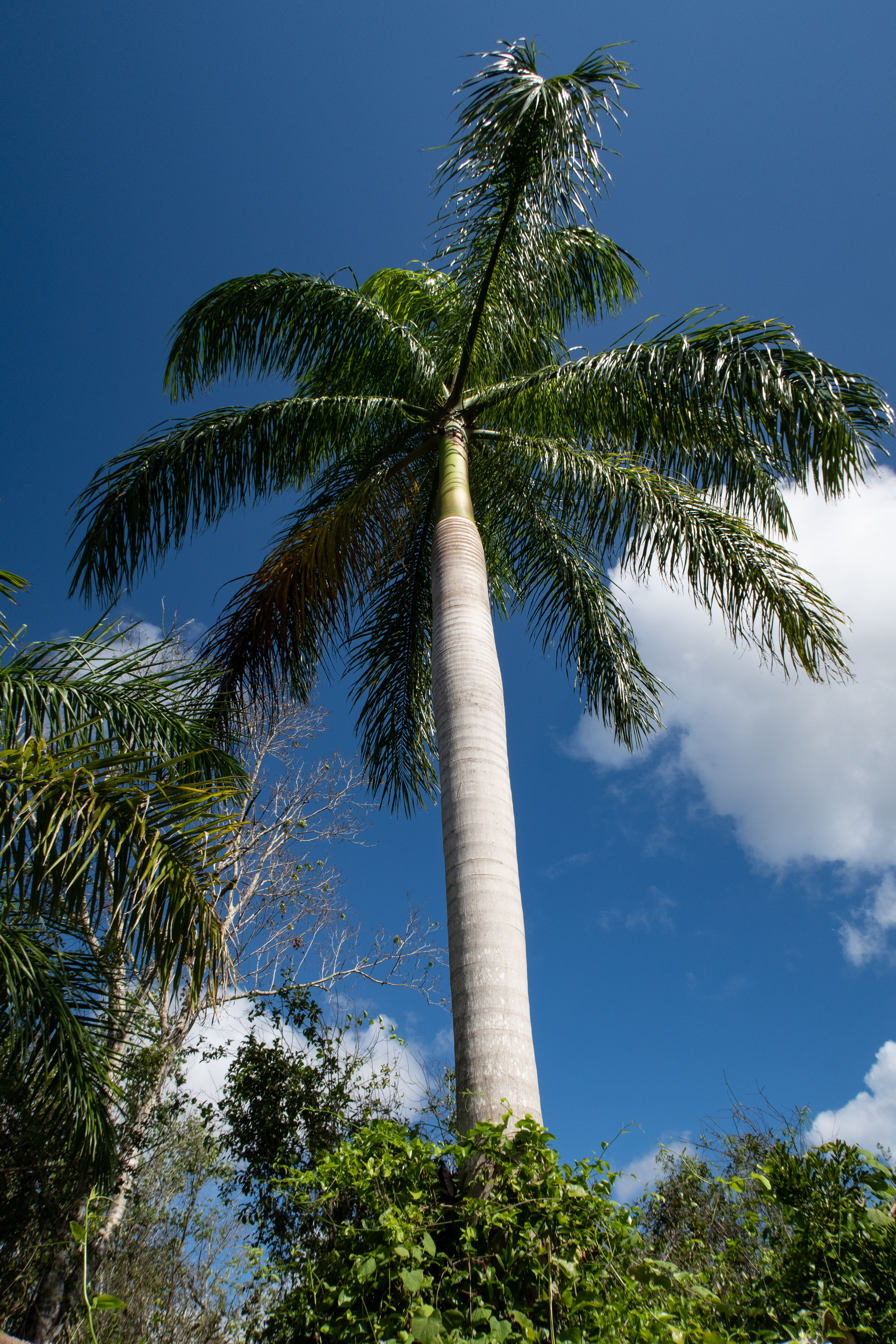
Royal palm tree in Fakahatchee Strand

Pop ash, swamp laurel oak, red maple, and bald cypress dominate the strand. Large bald cypress trees used to form the canopy of the Fakahatchee Strand, but almost all of the mature bald cypress trees were logged out in the middle of the 20th century. Bald cypress will probably dominate the canopy again, but Lodge expects full growth of the cypress trees to take another century. A 215-acre (87 ha) stand of virgin bald cypress survives at Big Cypress Bend near the Tamiami Trail. Some of those remaining cypress trees are being overwhelmed by strangler figs (Ficus aurea).

The Fakahatchee is one of just four places in Florida where royal palms grow naturally, and has the largest stand of royal palms in the US. It is also one or two places in the world in which Bald cypress and royal palms grow together in the same community. Many mature royal palm trees were removed from the Fahahatchee in the 1920s to be used for landscaping elsewhere in Florida. Royal palms are doing well in Fakahatchee, but they may be hybridizing with imported Cuban royal palms. More than 20 royal palm hammocks were in the Fakahatchee in 1990. The central royal palm hammock had about 3,000 mature trees, while peripheral hammocks had 10 to 90 trees each. The royal palm hammocks include large oak trees, mostly laurel oak (Quercus laurifolia), and various tropical trees.

=== Understory ===
Cabbage palms are hosts to many mosses and ferns, including narrow (Campyloneurum angustifolium), long (C. phyllitidis), and tailed (C. costatum) strap ferns, giant (Acrostichum danaeifolium) and golden (A. aureum) leather ferns, and cinnamon ferns (Osmundastrum cinnamomeum). Other ferns found in the Fakahatchee include the royal fern (Osmunda spectabilis), netted chain fern (Lorinseria areolata), Virginia chain fern (Anchistea virginica), "water spangles" {Salvinia minima), mosquito fern (Azolla cristata), and hand fern (Cheiroglossa palmata). The whisk fern (Psilotum nudum), a fern relative that does not have leaves or true roots, grows on trees, stumps, and humus.

Fakahatchee has most of the flowering epiphytes known in the United States: 14 bromeliads, 23 orchids, and 4 peperomias. Bromeliads in the Fakahatchee range from the fuzzy-wuzzy airplant (Tillandsia pruinosa), just a few inches long, to the giant wild pine (Tillandsia utriculata), which grows to (6 to 12 feet (1.8 to 3.7 m) long. Most Florida bromeliads are self-pollinated. Many of the bromeliads are "tank" species, which store water in a tank formed by overlapping leaves. Powdery catopsis (Catopsis berteroniana) appears to be carnivorous, resembling a pitcher plant. Spanish moss (Tillandsia usneoides) is another bromeliad found in the Fakahatchee.

=== Rare and endangered ===
In 1990, Austin, Jones, and Bennett published a list of 27 families and 106 species of plants found in the Fakahatchee Strand Preserve that appeared on at least one list of endangered plants, more than one-fifth of the species of plants then known to be in the Preserve. Species on an endangered list included a cycad, 13 families and 33 species of ferns, a total of 38 epiphytic species (including 11 species of Bromeliaceae, 23 species of Orchidaceae, and four species of Piperaceae), and several semi-epiphytic orchids. Two species, the fern Thelypteris grandis and the orchid Maxillaria conferta, had not been found anywhere else in the United States as of 1990. As of 2014, the Fakahatchee hosted 71 plant species that were listed as imperiled or critically imperiled by the Florida Natural Areas Inventory (FNAI) (Note: The Florida Natural Areas Inventory is part of the NatureServe network administered by Florida State University.) and/or the Florida Department of Agriculture and Consumer Services (FDACS).

Several species of plants in the Fakahatchee Strand are not found anywhere else in North America, including the hanging club-moss (Phlegmariurus dichotomus), (Note: The hanging club-moss and tiny orchid may be extirpated in the Fakahatchee Strand.) wild birdnest fern (Asplenium serratum), tailed strap fern (Campyloneurum costatum), lattice-vein fern (Thelypteris reticulata), stately maiden fern (Thelypteris grandis), nodding catopsis (Catopsis nutans), tiny orchid (Lepanthopsis melanantha), dwarf epidendrum (Prosthechea pygmaea), cypress-knee helmet orchid (Cranichis muscosa), and Acuna's star orchid (Epidendrum blancheanum). Another four plant species in the Fakahatchee that are found at only one or two other sites in the United States include; tall liparis (Liparis nervosa), leafless orchid (Campylocentrum pachyrrhizum), matted epidendrum (Epidendrum strobiliferum), and leafy beaked ladies tresses (Sacoila lanceolata var. paludicola). Each species is exceedingly rare and would be valued by collectors.

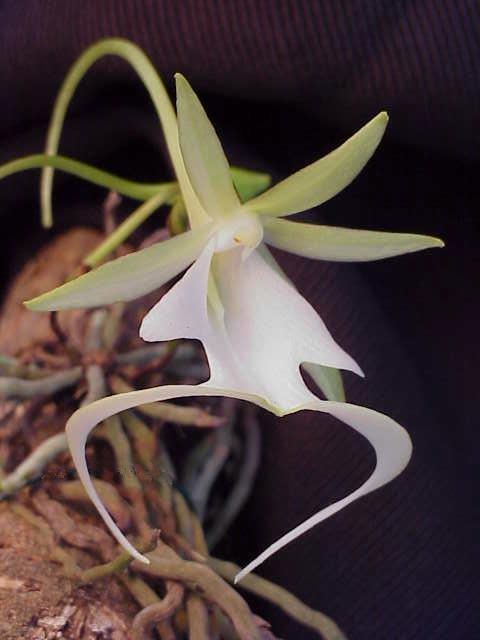
Ghost orchid

The endangered cowhorn orchid (Cyrtopodium punctatum) is very rare, with less than 30 plants known to be growing wild in the Fakahatchee in 2014. As of that year, young cowhorn orchids raised in nurseries were being placed in the strand to expand the population. The Fakahatchee is one of the few places that the ghost orchid, (Dendrophylax lindenii), is found in Florida. The largest population in Florida probably is in the Fakahatchee. As of 2014 the ghost orchid was listed as endangered by the State of Florida but not by the United States government. While more than 350 plants were known in the Fakahatchee at that time, poaching remained a threat to the species. The illegal removal of ghost orchids from the Fakahatchee Strand is the subject of Susan Orlean's 1998 book The Orchid Thief.

=== Exotics ===
More than 550 plant species have been documented in the Fakahatchee, of which 101 are non-native. As of 2014, the Florida Exotic Pest Plant Council (now the Florida Invasive Species Council) had listed 49 species as invasive species. At that time efforts were underway to removed invasive species from the Fakahatchee, including Brazilian pepper (Schinus terebinthifolia), melaleuca {Schinus terebinthifolia), Australian pines (Casuarina cunninghamiana, C. equisetifolia, and C. glauca), air potato (Dioscorea bulbifera), cogon grass (Imperata cylindrica), Napier grass (Cenchrus purpureus), torpedo grass (Panicum repens), Mexican petunia {Ruellia simplex), Christmas senna (Senna bicapsularis), rosary pea (Abrus precatorius), and old world climbing fern (Lygodium microphyllum). Many exotics were introduced during logging operations in the mid-20th century, including orange, grapefruit, tangerine, and mango trees that are found along the trams (old rail embankments). Other exotics are concentrated along roads and hiking trails.

== Lichens ==
Lucking et al. reported 432 species of lichens in 35 families as present in the Preserve in 2011. The lichens in the Preserve are a mixture of tropical and temperate types, with tropical species a bit more abundant. Most of the lichens found grow on bark (corticolous) or leaves (foliicolous). Lichens that grow on rocks (saxicolous) are absent as the few surface outcroppings of rock are normally underwater at least part of the year.

== Fauna ==
Native mammals of the Fakahatchee include the American alligator (Alligator mississippiensis), Florida black bear (Ursus americanus floridanus), Everglades mink (Neovison vison evergladensis), Florida panther (Puma cocolor couguar), raccoon (Procyon lotor), river otter (Lontra canadensis), white-tailed deer (Odocoileus virginianus), and bobcat (Lynx rufus). Insects found in the Fakahatchee include the eastern lubber grasshopper (Romalea microptera), viceroy butterfly (Limenitis archippus), swallowtail butterfly (Papilio species), ruddy daggerwing (Marpesia petreus) and zebra longwing (Heliconius charithonia).

As of 2014, the Fakahatchee hosted 44 animal species, including butterflies, snakes, birds, and mammals, that were listed as imperiled or critically imperiled by the Florida Natural Areas Inventory (FNAI), and/or as endangered, threatened, or of special concern by the U.S. Fish and Wildlife Service (USFWS), Florida Fish and Wildlife Conservation Commission (FWC), and/or the Florida Department of Agriculture and Consumer Services (FDACS).

Exotic animals, including wild animals that are not native to the Fakahatchee (such as island apple snails [Pomacea maculata], red fire ants [Solenopsis invicta], and Mexican bromeliad weevils [Metamasius callizona]), escaped pets and other domestic animals, and feral animals are removed from the Fakahatchee when found. Native animals including raccoons, grey squirrels, and alligators that have become nuisances may be removed from the Fakahatchee when necessary.

Non-native fish species found in the Fakahatchee include the brown hoplo (Hoplosternum littorale), pike killifish (Belonesox belizanus), black acara (Cichlasoma bimaculatum), Mayan cichlid (Cichlasoma urophthalmum), blue tilapia (Oreochromis aureus), spotted tilapia (Tilapia mariae), oscar (Astronotus ocellatus), walking catfish (Clarias batrachus), African jewel cichlid (Hemichromis bimaculatus), and a large South American suckermouth armored catfish “pleco” species (Hypostomus sp., or Pterygoplichthys sp.) As of 2014, there were no plans to remove exotic fish from the Fakahatchee.

Cuban tree frogs (Osteopilus septentrionalis), and, as of 2014, one individual each of green anaconda (Eunectes murinus), Burmese python (Python bivittatus), and red-tailed boa constrictor (Boa constrictor) have also been found in the Fakahatchee.

== Cited sources ==
- Austin, Daniel F.; Jones, Julie L.; Bennett, Bradley C. (1990a). "Vascular Plants of Fakahatchee Strand State Preserve". Florida Scientist. 53 (2): 89–117. ISSN 0098-4590.
- Austin, Daniel F.; Jones, Julie L.; Bennett, Bradley C. (1990b). "Endangered Plants of Fakahatchee Strand State Preserve". Rhodora. 92 (869): 27–35. ISSN 0035-4902.
- Larson, Ron (1995). Swamp Song: A Natural History of Florida's Swamps. Gainesville, Florida: University Press of Florida. ISBN 9-780-8130-1355-8.
- Lodge, Thomas E. (2005). The Everglades Handbook: Understanding the Ecosystem (Second ed.). Boca Raton, Florida: CRC Press. ISBN 9-781-5667-0614-8.
- Lucking, Robert; Seavey, Frederick; Common, Ralph S.; Beeching, Sean Q.; Breuss, Othmar; Buck, William R.; Crane, Lee; Hodges, Malcolm; Hodkinson, Brendan P.; Lay, Elisabeth; Lendemer, James C.; McMullin, R. Troy; Mercado, Joel (2011). "The lichens of Fakahatchee Strand Preserve State Park, Florida: Proceedings from the 18th Tuckerman Workshop" (PDF). Bulletin of the Florida Museum of Natural History. 49 (4): 127–186 – via United States Forest Service.
- Owen, Mike; Otto, Eric (2009). "On the Fakahatchee and Susan Orlean's "The Orchid Thief": An Interview with Mike Owen, a Park Biologist". Interdisciplinary Literary Studies. 10 (2): 99–113. ISSN 1524-8429.
- "The Floristic Inventory of South Florida: Fakahatchee Strand Preserve State Park". The Institute for Regional Conservation. 2025.
- Fakahatchee Strand Preserve State Park Approved Unit Management Plan (PDF) (Report). Tallahassee, Florida: Florida Department of Environmental Protection. August 19, 2014.
- "Fakahatchee Strand Preserve State Park". Florida State Parks.
