= Strand swamp =

Forested wetland habitat in Florida

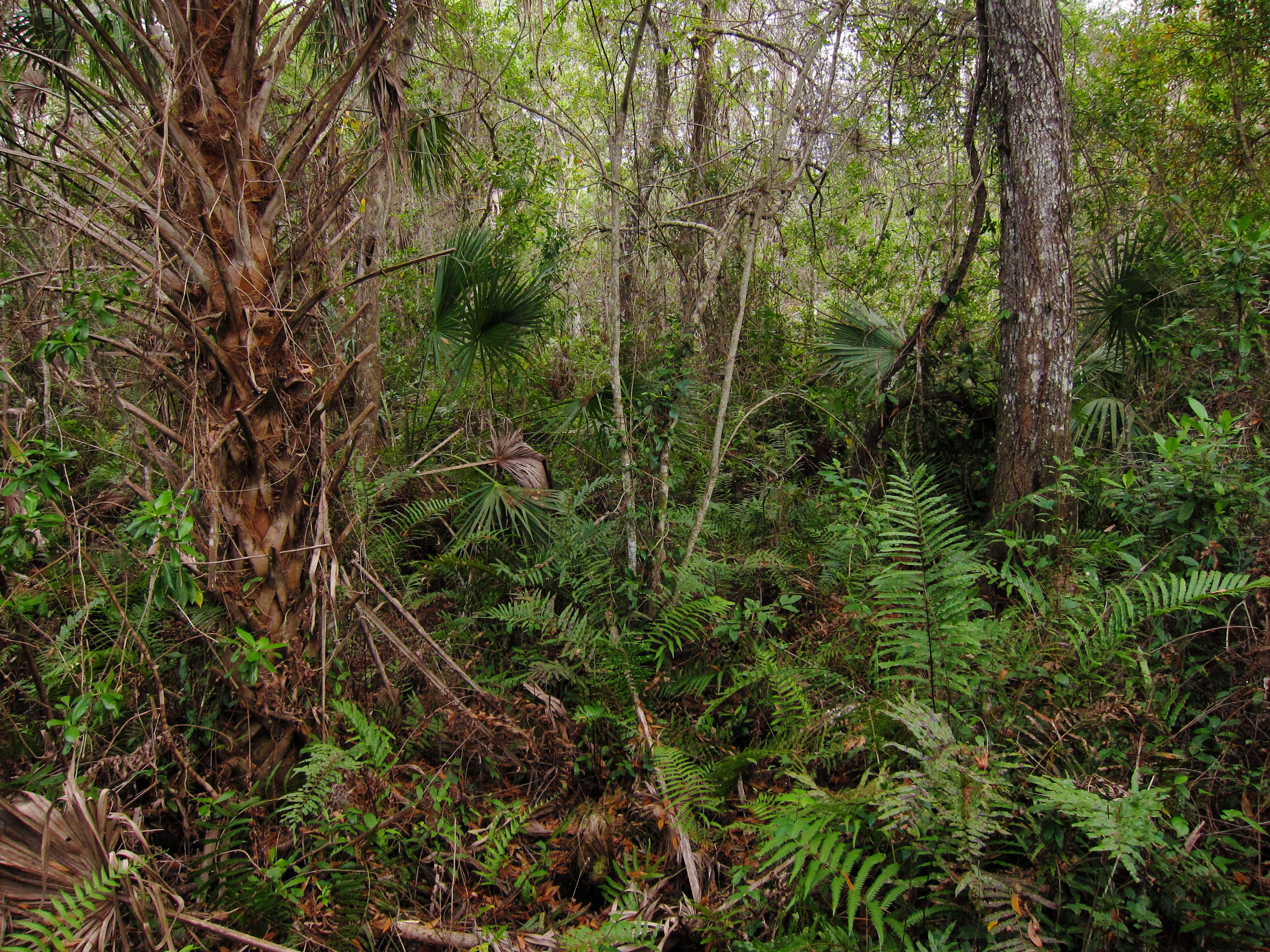
Undergrowth in the Fakahatchee Strand State Preserve.

A strand swamp or strand is a type of swamp in Florida in which water flows slowly along a linear shallow depression across flatlands. Strand swamps are found only in Southwestern Florida, primarily in or near the Big Cypress swamp. While historically dominated by bald cypress trees (Taxodium distichum), many other trees and smaller plants occur in strands, and hardwood trees often dominate in areas where cypress trees have been logged off.

== Distribution ==
Strand swamps occur only in southwestern Florida, primarily in or near the Big Cypress swamp in Collier County. The most notable strand swamp is the Fakahatchee Strand. Other strand swamps in southwestern Florida include, from northwest to southeast, the Picayune Stand, Kissimmee Billy Strand, Deep Lake Strand, Skillet Strand, New River Strand, Monroe Strand, Gannet Strand, Gator Hook Strand, Roberts Lakes Strand, Sweetwater Strand, Sig Walter Strand, and Gum Slough. The orientation of the strands varies, with the northwesternmost strands, the Picayune and Fakahatchee, flowing from north to south, and the southeasternmost strand, the Gum Slough, flowing east to west. While the Corkscrew swamp is sometimes referred to as a strand swamp and has large bald cypress trees in a mixed swamp, Thomas Lodge notes that it is not "in the form of a strand".

== Description ==
A forested wetland ecological habitat, strands occur on land areas with high water tables where the lack of slope and slow rate of flow inhibits the carving out of a stream bed. Strands are more linear than the cypress dome swamps that form in more rounded depressions and are fairly similar to floodplain swamps that form further north along streams and rivers. Strand swamps are forested, with the tallest trees in the middle of the channel.

Strands occupy linear depressions in nearly level limestone plains with high water tables. Carbonic acid (carbon dioxide dissolved in water) and humic acids dissolve exposed limestone. Some areas of the limestone plain erode faster than others, leaving slight depressions in the plain. Cypress twigs and needles tend to accumulate in the depressions, producing peat. The peat produces increased humic acids, leading to further erosion of the limestone. The roots of trees growing in the accumulated peat penetrate and breakup the limestone. The accumulating peat may rise about the water table. If the peat above the water table does not burn in a wildfire, hardwoods such as red maples may replace the cypress trees. Beneath a strand swamp are layers of peat. Established strand swamps with a large amount of vegetation have deep peat layers. These deep peat layers can serve as a wick to draw water from underground into the swamp during droughts. Strand swamps receive most of their input from rainfall instead of runoff. Strands resemble river swamps, but differ from rivers in that the water in a strand flows in a broad sheet rather than in a stream bed.

== Vegetation ==
Due to uneven erosion of the limestone, and variations in the development of peat, strands include a variety of habitats and a plentiful mixture of trees, shrubs, and herbaceous plants. Slight differences in elevation create different environmental conditions, ranging from relatively dry hydric hammocks, dominated by cabbage palm, red maple, swamp Laurel oak, and live oak, to areas which remain flooded for much of the time, dominated by cypresses, pond apple, and pop ash. The hydroperiod, which can range from 100 to 300 days, typically begins in June, following the beginning of the rainy season. The strands are driest during the winter and early spring.

Strand swamps were historically dominated by bald cypress (Taxodium distichum). Shallower areas of strand swamps, including along the margins, may contain pond cypress (Taxodium ascendens). When either of these trees dominate, the strand is known as a "cypress strand". Outside of protected areas, most old-growth cypress trees in Florida along streams or lakes have been harvested for their rot-resistant wood. Based on regrowth of cypress in the logged over areas, Thomas Lodge estimated in 2005 that it would take at least another century for the cypress trees to regain their pre-logging dominance and stature in the Fakahatchee Strand. The Big Cypress Bend in the Fakahatchee Strand, near the Tamiami Trail 7 miles (11 km) west of State road 29, and the Corkscrew Swamp Sanctuary preserve unlogged areas where cypress trees are up to 700 years old and 100 ft (30 m) tall.

Many rare epiphytes are found in strand swamps. These include: American bird’s nest fern (Asplenium serratum), narrow-leaved strap fern (Campyloneurum angustifolium), tailed strap fern (C. costatum), many-flowered catopsis (Catopsis floribunda), cowhorn orchid (Cyrtopodium punctatum), Fakahatchee guzmania (Guzmania monostachia), hand fern (Cheiroglossa palmata), fuzzy-wuzzy air-plant (Tillandsia pruinosa), entire-winged bristle fern (Trichomanes holopterum), and leafy vanilla (Vanilla phaeantha).

== Other plants ==
Undisturbed strand swamps support a number of plant species:

Epiphytes and vines

- white twinevine (Sarcostemma clausum)
- common wild-pine (Tillandsia fasciculata)
- eastern poison ivy (Toxicodendron radicans)

Herbs

- giant leather fern (Acrostichum danaeifolium)
- waterhyssops (Bacopa spp.)
- toothed midsorus fern (Blechnum serrulatum)
- sawgrass (Cladium jamaicense)
- string lily (Crinum americanum)
- royal fern (Osmunda regalis var. spectabilis)

Shrubs

- red maple (Acer rubrum)
- pond apple (Annona glabra)
- common buttonbush (Cephalanthus occidentalis)
- strangler fig (Ficus aurea)
- sweetbay (Magnolia virginiana)
- wax myrtle (Myrica cerifera)
- swamp bay (Persea palustris)
- swamp laurel oak (Quercus laurifolia)
- mursine (Myrsine cubana}
- Florida royal palm (Roystonea regia)
- cabbage palm (Sabal palmetto)
- coastalplain willow (Salix caroliniana)

== Animals ==
Rare animals found in strand swamps include: short-tailed hawk (Buteo brachyurus), swallow-tailed kite (Elanoides forficatus), mangrove fox squirrel (Sciurus niger avicennia), Florida panther (Puma concolor coryi), Florida black bear (Ursus americanus floridanus), and the southern Florida population of the American mink (Neovison vison).

Strand swamps are also home to a number of other animals, including Florida redbelly turtle (Pseudemys nelsoni), wood stork (Mycteria americana), and wild turkey (Meleagris gallopavo).

== Cited sources ==
- Larson, Ron (1995). Swamp Song: A Natural History of Florida's Swamps. Gainesville, Florida: University Press of Florida. ISBN 978-0-8130-1355-8.
- Lodge, Thomas E. (2005). The Everglades Handbook: Understanding the Ecosystem (Second ed.). Boca Raton, Florida: CRC Press. ISBN 978-1-5667-0614-8.
- "Strand Swamp" (PDF). Florida Natural Area Inventory. 2010.
