= Florida panther (disambiguation) =

The Florida panther is a type of cougar native to Florida.

Florida panther may also refer to:

- Florida Panthers, an NHL hockey team.
- FIU Panthers, the athletic program of Florida International University
