= Amerosporiopsis phaeographidis =

Scientific classification
- Kingdom: Fungi
- Division: Ascomycota
- Class: incertae sedis
- Order: incertae sedis
- Family: incertae sedis
- Genus: Amerosporiopsis
- Species: A. phaeographidis

Binomial name
- Amerosporiopsis phaeographidis Diederich & Common (2019)

Species of fungus

Amerosporiopsis phaeographidis is a species of lichenicolous fungus in the subphylum Pezizomycotina. It grows as black spots on the lichen Phaeographis brasiliensis, from which it gets its name. It has only been found in one place in the Fakahatchee Strand Preserve State Park in Florida in the United States. Molecular phylogenetics testing might reveal that this is actually a new genus, but it is morphologically similar to the one other species in Amerosporiopsis, except that it has wider conidia, has no conidiophores, and lives in a different habitat.

== Description ==
Amerosporiopsis phaeographidis exists primarily as a mycelium, which is the vegetative part of the fungus, consisting of a network of fine, filamentous cells that are colorless (hyaline) and embed within the host tissue. This fungus does not form ascomata, which are the sexual reproductive structures typically found in other fungi. The conidiomata, which are asexual reproductive structures, are typically more or less spherical (subglobose), black, and initially buried within the host tissue (immersed). As they mature, they break through the host's surface (erumpent). These structures are usually single-chambered (unilocular), with thick walls, measuring between 60 and 100 micrometers (μm) in diameter. Surrounding the conidiomata is a clypeus-like structure, which gives them an irregular appearance when viewed from above, and can extend up to 200 μm across.

The walls of these conidiomata are formed only on the upper and side portions and consist of several layers of cells. The external layers are dark brown and turn dark olive when stained with a potassium hydroxide solution (K+), while the inner layers remain hyaline. The outer surface of these structures is covered with subspherical to elongated darker cells, which are especially visible under a microscope, giving the conidiomata a somewhat rough (rugose) texture. The base of the conidiomata wall may appear colorless or be indistinct. As they age, they sometimes open irregularly to form a cup-shaped (cupulate) structure, though the opening (ostiole) through which spores typically release is often not noticeable or completely absent.

Inside the conidiomata, spore-producing structures (conidiophores) emerge from the walls either from the base or the sides. These conidiophores are branched chains of short, irregular cells. The cells that actually produce the spores (conidiogenous cells) are tube-shaped, narrowing at one end to form a tiny opening, and are clear and smooth. These cells range in size from 7.5 to 12.7 μm in length and from 2.3 to 3.5 μm in width. The spores (conidia) themselves are clear (hyaline), without sections (aseptate), and range from rod-shaped (bacilliform) to narrowly spindle-shaped (narrowly fusiform). They have rounded tops and bases that are indistinctly flat (truncate), with thin and smooth walls. These spores measure between 7.7 and 12.3 μm in length and between 1.0 and 1.8 μm in width. The length-to-breadth ratio of these spores varies from about 4.6 to 10.
