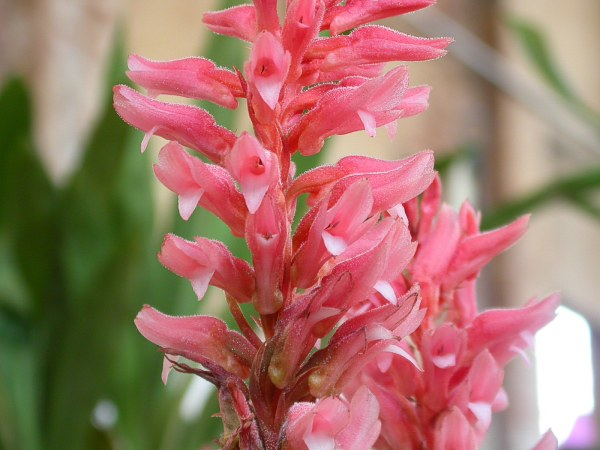
- Sacoila lanceolata

Scientific classification
- Kingdom: Plantae
- Clade: Tracheophytes
- Clade: Angiosperms
- Clade: Monocots
- Order: Asparagales
- Family: Orchidaceae
- Subfamily: Orchidoideae
- Tribe: Cranichideae
- Subtribe: Spiranthinae
- Genus: Sacoila; Raf.

= Sacoila =

Genus of flowering plants

Sacoila is a genus of flowering plants from the orchid family, Orchidaceae, native to the Western Hemisphere. It occurs in Mexico, Central America, South America, the West Indies and Florida.

== Species ==
Species accepted as of June 2014:

- Sacoila argentina (Griseb.) Garay - Bolivia, Paraguay, Argentina
- Sacoila duseniana (Kraenzl.) Garay - Brazil
- Sacoila foliosa (Schltr.) Garay - Brazil
- Sacoila hassleri (Cogn.) Garay - Suriname, Paraguay, Brazil
- Sacoila lanceolata (Aubl.) Garay - widespread from Florida and Mexico south to Argentina
- Sacoila pedicellata (Cogn.) Garay - Brazil, Paraguay, Argentina
- Sacoila squamulosa (Kunth) Garay - Colombia, Costa Rica, Cuba, Jamaica, Leeward Islands, Cayman Islands, Florida

== See also ==
- List of Orchidaceae genera
