= Poinciana, Monroe County, Florida =

Planned community in Monroe County, Florida

Poinciana, Florida
- Planned community
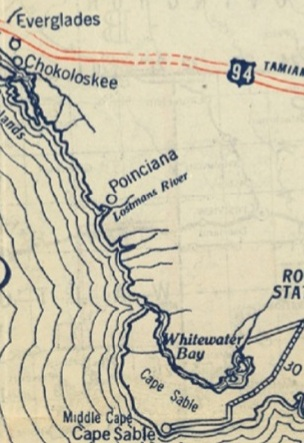
- Poinciana on a road map, c. 1927

- Location within Florida Location within the United States
- Coordinates: 25°36′41″N 81°08′00″W
- Country: United States of America
- State: Florida
- County: Monroe County
- Established: 1925
- Founder: Tropical Florida Development Company

Poinciana (also known as Poinciana Mainland) was a planned community that was to be located along the Lostmans River in Monroe County, Florida. Poinciana has been described as the Everglades's "most spectacular commercial enterprise" and "the prototype of all Florida scams".

== History ==
The city was planned by the Tropical Florida Development Company (later Poinciana Development Company) of Miami in 1925, advertising the community as a future "Miami of the Gulf Coast". The city was to have been built on the north side of the mouth of the river, on 3 land sections totaling over 100 square miles.

The project headquarters were located at Onion Key, a former Calusa settlement, where several portable houses were erected, along with docks and a small electrical station. Onion Key was chosen as it was covered by a midden, lifting it 5 feet above the water. The origin of Onion Key's name is disputed; local Totch Brown claimed it was from Gregorio Lopez eating his last onion there, while Charlton Tabeau claimed it was from an unidentified man who homesteaded the island with his wife and grew onions.

The developers of the property used creative advertisements to promote the new city. These advertisements often featured exaggerated or false claims, such as the site having banana, orange, lime, and coconut plants leftover from a Spanish settlement. Because of these campaigns, the company was able to sell almost 9,000 or 10,000 lots at Poinciana, many to owners who did not live in Florida. Many of these lots were located in mangrove forests, some over a mile from the river itself.

The city was going to be linked to the Tamiami Trail via the Poinciana Trail, a planned 15-mile road that would have gone from the new city to what is now Loop Road (County Road 94). The road's construction was highly sought after to encourage settlement, with county engineers even joining the project.

Poinciana was staffed by salesmen and the company brought potential customers on a road and boat trip to the city, however it is believed most customers never did actually visit the property. Company president William G. Blanchard and his family visited the town in June 1926, taking a committee from the county commissioners to review the planned site of the Poinciana Trail.

A school named "Poinciana Park" was located in the western half of mainland Monroe County around this time, but it is unknown if this was connected to the development.

The hurricane of 1926 destroyed all structures at Poinciana, and despite attempts to rebuild and continued newspaper advertising, the project was subsequently abandoned. A few employees moved the island's small electric station to a stretch of coast just north of the Lostmans River mouth and built some tar paper shacks around it, but nothing became of this.

In 1929, company official E. S. Rood was arrested and held for $1,000 bond on 5 charges of mail fraud from deceptive promotional fliers the company distributed in the mail. He was scheduled to be tried before the United States District Court in Miami on April 22 that year.

During the land acquisition process for the Everglades National Park in the 1950s, the NPS was hindered by the many real estate title issues at the property; in 1958, the Miami Herald reported that 1,350 people were still paying taxes on land owned in the "phantom town", and over 2,000 lots were still privately owned in 1960. The site was eventually made part of the park, Onion Key being used as a wilderness campsite before being made off-limits to the public. The second site of the electric station was later used as a ranger station but this too no longer exists.
