= Swampland in Florida =

Figure of speech referring to real estate scams

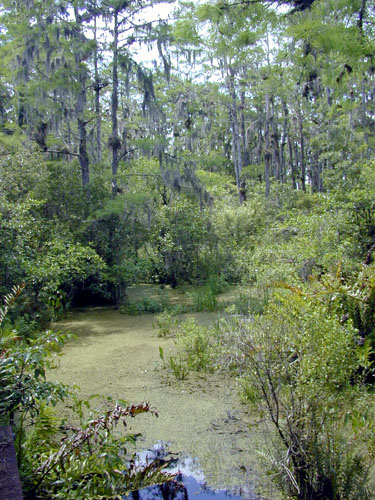
A freshwater swamp in Florida

Swampland in Florida is a figure of speech referring to real estate scams in which a seller misrepresents unusable swampland as developable property. These types of unseen property scams became widely known in the United States in the 20th century, and the phrase is often used metaphorically for any scam that misrepresents what is being sold. Expressions like "If you believe that, then I have swampland in Florida to sell you", suggests the recipient is gullible enough to fall for an obvious fraud. Similar phrases involve "selling" the Brooklyn Bridge or nonexistent "oceanfront property in Arizona".

== Etymology ==
The phrase originates from the common land banking scams of the 1920s, when booming "land mania" preceded the Great Depression. One of the original sellers of swampland was Charles Ponzi.

Similar terms came from the early 20th century where con-men would sell landmarks to which no one owns the title such as the Brooklyn Bridge to newly arrived immigrants in the United States. The phrase about gullibility referring to those events said, "if you believe that, I've got a bridge to sell you." Those evolved in the 1960s and 1970s to include fraudulent sales of near-worthless swampland real estate in Florida.

Though the term originates in the United States, it is now also understood and used in other English-speaking countries.

Grant Oster points out that the practice of the unseen property scam predates the existence of the United States. He points to Erik the Red's sale of colonization of Greenland, circa 982, as an example.

== Actual value of swampland ==
The common usage of this term implies that swampland is worthless. Without development or some ability to develop it, it is not valuable for real estate purposes. There have been cases that swampland was purchased and turned into very valuable property, notably for the creation of Walt Disney World and also to some extent including many developed lands in Florida. Sometimes that is done by businesses to meet a development permit requirement to preserve some Florida land in order to build on other Florida land.

== Unseen property sale scams ==
=== Florida swampland scams ===
One of the earliest swampland scams in Florida was Poinciana, a development in the Everglades that sold nearly 9,000 lots in 1925 and 1926 despite almost all of the property being mangroves and a "Shangri-La for crustaceans and mosquitoes". Advertisements for the development made many false claims about the property. The project was shut down after the development headquarters were destroyed in a hurricane.

In the 1960s and 1970s, scammers used nationwide advertising to lure victims to buy Florida real estate without visiting the properties first. This technique was used notably by the Gulf American Land Corporation in the communities of Cape Coral and Golden Gate Estates, Florida (for which they were found guilty of fraud by the Florida Land Sales Board). It was a form of confidence trick. The new owners came to find their land was underwater in a swamp or in some other way impossible to build upon. As the scam became widely known, California and New York legislators acted in 1963 to restrict this false advertising. Florida also enacted the Installment Land Sales Act that year in an effort to restore its reputation.

Swampland scams still occur in Florida. The Internet has brought about a resurgence via online auctions of Florida real estate. Scammers circumvent commercial registration requirements by making one-on-one sales. Over great distances some buyers can be convinced to pay before verifying claims. It usually involves unbuildable swampland misrepresented as buildable to fraudulently inflate the sale price.

=== Swampland in Arizona ===
A similar phrase, which replaces the word Florida with Arizona, is also used for the same reasons. As Arizona is well known to have an arid climate, it is assumed that wetlands in that state are non-existent (though several exist within the Apache-Sitgreaves National Forests). The implication is that the target of the insult is not only more gullible than someone who would buy swampland in Florida, but also ignorant. Another variation of the phrase is "oceanfront property in Arizona", of which none exists because Arizona is a landlocked state. Country songwriter George Strait released an album Ocean Front Property with this variation as its title.

=== Desert land scams ===
Recent land sale scams have been sale of inaccessible desert land in Arizona and west Texas. The lots are sold over the Internet, and are desert properties with no access to water, no sewer service, and in many cases, are not accessible by road.

== See also ==
- Land banking scams
- Picayune Strand State Forest
- Glengarry Glen Ross, a 1983 Pulitzer Prize-winning play by David Mamet about unscrupulous salesmen attempting to sell the titular plots of unbuildable Florida swampland to unsuspecting clients. Later adapted into an Academy Award-nominated film of the same name.
