= Deep Lake (Florida) =

Natural sinkhole in Big Cypress National Preserve in Florida

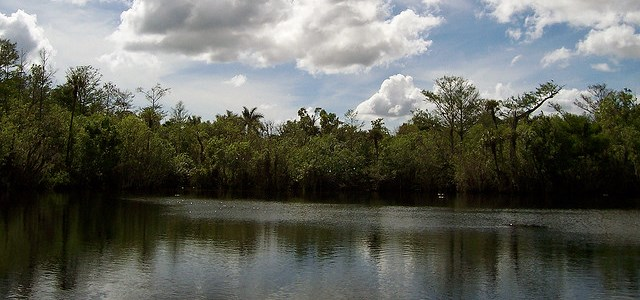

- Location within Florida Location within the United States
- Location: Big Cypress National Preserve, Collier County, Florida, US
- Coordinates: 26°03′02″N 81°20′33″W
- Basin countries: United States

Deep Lake is a natural sinkhole in Big Cypress National Preserve in Florida. This 90-foot-deep naturally occurring sinkhole lake is the deepest lake south of Lake Okeechobee, and one of the deepest in the entire state. It is the namesake of the community built around it, Deep Lake, Florida and of the Deep Lake Strand, a strand swamp to the east of the Fakahatchee Strand State Preserve and Florida State Road 29.

== See also ==
- List of sinkholes of the United States
