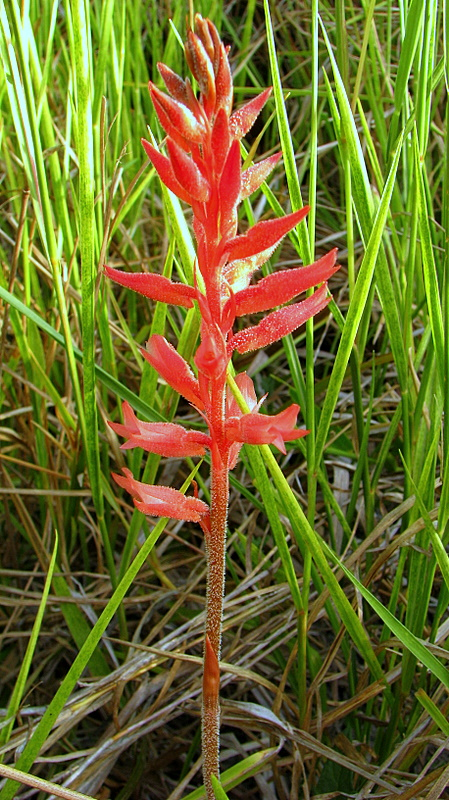

Scientific classification
- Kingdom: Plantae
- Clade: Embryophytes
- Clade: Tracheophytes
- Clade: Spermatophytes
- Clade: Angiosperms
- Clade: Monocots
- Order: Asparagales
- Family: Orchidaceae
- Subfamily: Orchidoideae
- Tribe: Cranichideae
- Genus: Sacoila
- Species: S. lanceolata

Binomial name
- Sacoila lanceolata (Aubl.) Garay

Synonyms
- Homotypic: Gyrostachys lanceolata (Aubl.) Kuntze; Limodorum lanceolatum Aubl.; Neottia lanceolata (Aubl.) Willd.; Spiranthes lanceolata (Aubl.) León; Stenorrhynchos lanceolatum (Aubl.) Rich.; Heterotypic: Gyrostachys aphylla (Hook.) Kuntze; Gyrostachys orchioides (Sw.) Kuntze; Gyrostachys stenorhynchus Kuntze; Ibidium crystalligerum Salisb.; Neottia aphylla Hook.; Neottia orchioides (Sw.) Sw.; Neottia plantaginea Hook.; Pachygenium aphyllum (Vell.) Szlach., R.González & Rutk.; Pelexia aphylla (Vell.) Schltr.; Pelexia tomentosa (Vell.) Schltr.; Sacoila apetala (Kraenzl.) Garay; Sacoila lanceolata f. albidaviridis Catling & Sheviak; Sacoila lanceolata var. australis (Lindl.) Szlach.; Sacoila lanceolata var. luteoalba (Rchb.f.) Sauleda, Wunderlin & B.F.Hansen; Sacoila lanceolata f. luteoalba (Rchb.f.) Meneguzzo; Sacoila lanceolata var. secundiflora (Lillo & Hauman) Szlach.; Sacoila lurida Raf.; Sacoila paludicola (Luer) P.M.Br.; Sacoila riograndensis (Kraenzl.) Garay; Sacoila secundiflora (Lillo & Hauman) Garay; Satyrium orchioides Sw.; Serapias aphylla Vell.; Serapias coccinea Vell.; Serapias neottia J.F.Gmel.; Serapias tomentosa Vell.; Skeptrostachys sancti-jacobi (Kraenzl.) Garay; Spiranthes jaliscana S.Watson; Spiranthes lanceolata var. luteoalba (Rchb.f.) Luer; Spiranthes lanceolata var. paludicola Luer; Spiranthes orchioides (Sw.) A.Rich.; Stenorrhynchos apetalum Kraenzl.; Stenorrhynchos aphyllum (Hook.) Sweet; Stenorrhynchos australe Lindl.; Stenorrhynchos australe var. luteoalbum Rchb.f.; Stenorrhynchos cinnabarinum var. luteoalbus (Rchb.f.) W.J.Schrenk; Stenorrhynchos cinnabarinum var. paludicola (Luer) W.J.Schrenk; Stenorrhynchos coccineum (Vell.) Hoehne; Stenorrhynchos guatemalense Schltr.; Stenorrhynchos jaliscanum (S.Watson) Nash; Stenorrhynchos lanceolatum var. luteoalbum (Rchb.f.) W.J.Schrenk; Stenorrhynchos lanceolatum var. paludicola (Luer) W.J.Schrenk; Stenorrhynchos orchioides (Sw.) Rich.; Stenorrhynchos orchioides var. australe Kraenzl.; Stenorrhynchos orchioides var. plantagineum Lindl.; Stenorrhynchos riograndense Kraenzl.; Stenorrhynchos sancti-antonii Kraenzl.; Stenorrhynchos sancti-jacobi Kraenzl.; Stenorrhynchos secundiflorum Lillo & Hauman

= Sacoila lanceolata =

Species of orchid

Sacoila lanceolata, commonly referred to as leafless beaked orchid, is a species of flowering plant in the family Orchidaceae. It grows in Florida the West Indies, Mexico, Central America, and South America in swamps, grassland, and hydric hammocks, including along roadsides.

== Description ==
Sacoila lanceolata is a terrestrial plant with four to six oblong leaves which do not persist to the time of its flowering. Flowering spikes are from 30cm to 60cm high, and bear a large, dense inflorescence of tubular, bright red or rarely yellow flowers and lanceolate, red-brown bracts. It flowers from April to early July.

S. lanceolata var. paludicola is known from Fakahatchee Strand in South Florida. It differs from var. lanceolata in having brighter flowers, leaves that survive during flowering, and flowering earlier in January and February.
