= Florida Panther National Wildlife Refuge =

United States National Wildlife Refuge in Florida

- IUCN category IV (habitat/species management area)
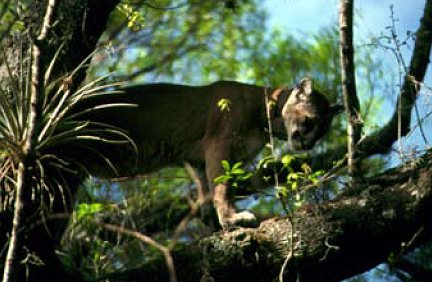
- Florida panther

- Location within the United States
- Location: Collier County, Florida, U.S.
- Nearest city: Naples
- Coordinates: 26°10′20″N 081°22′38″W
- Area: 26,400 acres (10,700 ha)
- Established: 1989
- Governing body: US Fish & Wildlife Service
- Website: Florida Panther National Wildlife Refuge

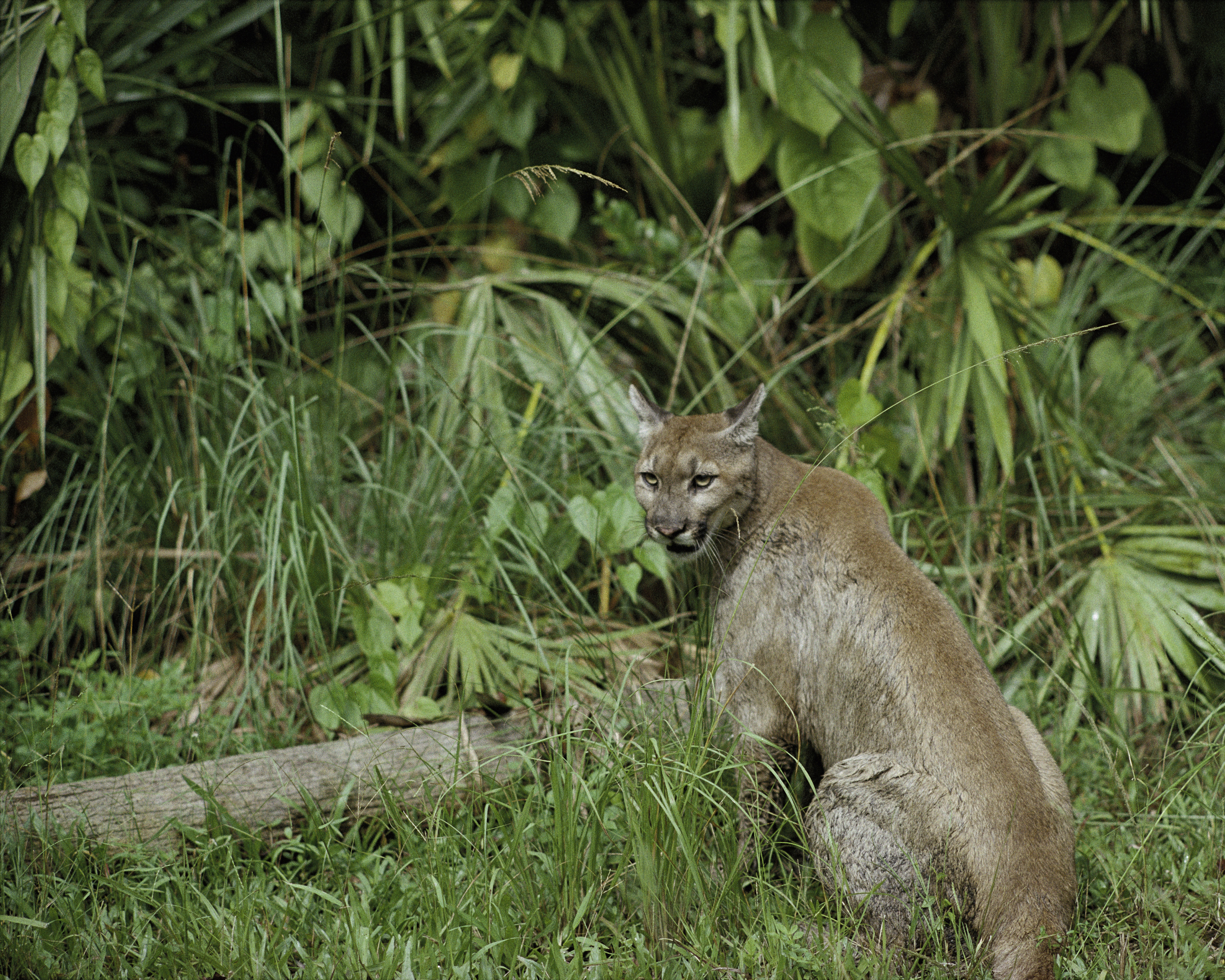
A panther in the Florida Panther National Wildlife Refuge

The Florida Panther National Wildlife Refuge is part of the United States National Wildlife Refuge System, located in southwestern Florida, twenty miles east of Naples, in the upper segment of the Fakahatchee Strand of the Big Cypress Swamp. It is north of I-75 and west of SR 29.

== History ==
The 26,400-acre (107 km^{2}) refuge was established in 1989 under the Endangered Species Act by the US Fish and Wildlife Service, to protect the endangered Florida panther, as well as other threatened plant and animal species. The Florida panther is the only cougar population found east of the Mississippi River. The refuge is part of a network of private land and government protected areas. Some of the public sections of the system are the Everglades National Park, Big Cypress National Preserve and Fakahatchee Strand State Preserve. The Florida Fish and Wildlife Conservation Commission estimates that there are about 120 to 230 adult Florida panthers, and the main population lives south of Lake Okeechobee. Fewer than a dozen panthers pass through the refuge each month. [1]

To protect the panther and other endangered inhabitants, general public use is only available at the southeast corner of the refuge, on designated hiking trails. All other areas can only be seen by way of limited tours.

== Flora ==
The refuge is a mix of dry, upland habitat and wetlands, including pine rocklands and tropical hardwood hammocks. Among the rare flowering plants there are tropical orchids such as Cyrtopodium punctatum and Epidendrum nocturnum.

== Fauna ==
Besides the panthers, the refuge is home to Big Cypress fox squirrels, bobcats, armadillos, raccoons, black bears, coyotes, alligators, swallow-tailed kites and several wood stork rookeries.

== Statistics ==
In 2005, the refuge had an 18-person staff and a fiscal year budget of $1,500,000 (with Ten Thousand Islands National Wildlife Refuge). Approximately 8,000 visitors come to the refuge each year.
