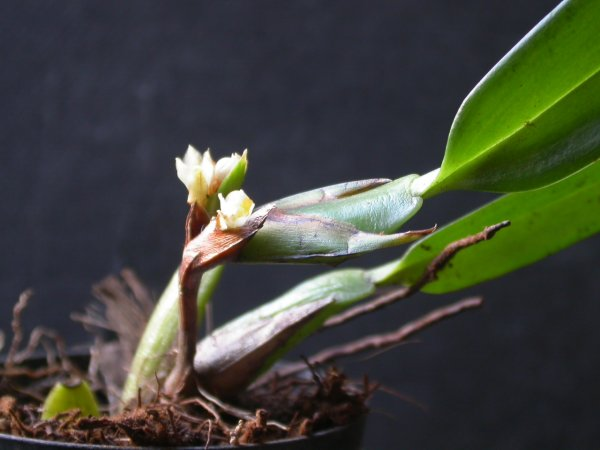

Scientific classification
- Kingdom: Plantae
- Clade: Tracheophytes
- Clade: Angiosperms
- Clade: Monocots
- Order: Asparagales
- Family: Orchidaceae
- Subfamily: Epidendroideae
- Genus: Maxillaria
- Species: M. parviflora

Binomial name
- Maxillaria parviflora (Poepp. & Endl.) Garay

Synonyms
- Camaridium micranthum M.A.Blanco; Camaridium purpureum Spreng.; Camaridium purpureum var. parviflorum (Poepp. & Endl.) Hoehne; Camaridium vestitum (Sw.) Lindl.; Chelyella purpurea Szlach. & Sitko; Cymbidium vestitum (Sw.) Sw.; Epidendrum vestitum Sw.; Maxillaria conferta (Griseb.) C.Schweinf. ex León; Maxillaria exigua Regel; Maxillaria purpurea (Spreng.) Ames & Correll 1943, illegitimate homonym not (Wight) Beer 1854; Maxillaria purpurea var. parviflora (Poepp. & Endl.) C.Schweinf.; Maxillaria simulans (Ames & C.Schweinf.) L.O.Williams; Maxillaria vestita (Sw.) A.Lemée; Ornithidium chloroleucum Barb.Rodr.; Ornithidium confertum Griseb.; Ornithidium parviflorum (Poepp. & Endl.) Rchb.f.; Ornithidium rhomboglossum Schltr.; Ornithidium simulans Ames & C.Schweinf.; Ornithidium vestitum (Sw.) Rchb.f. in W.G.Walpers; Ornithidium virescens Schltr.; Pseudomaxillaria chloroleuca (Barb.Rodr.) Hoehne; Pseudomaxillaria conferta (Griseb.) Szlach. & Sitko; Pseudomaxillaria parviflora (Poepp. & Endl.) Brieger; Pseudomaxillaria exigua (Regel) Szlach. & Sitko; Pseudomaxillaria rhomboglossa (Schltr.) Brieger; Pseudomaxillaria vestita (Sw.) Brieger; Pseudomaxillaria virescens (Schltr.) Brieger; Scaphyglottis parviflora Poepp. & Endl.

= Maxillaria parviflora =

Purple tiger orchid

Species of orchid

Maxillaria parviflora, the purple tiger orchid, is a species of epiphytic orchid native to Florida, the West Indies and through Latin America from Mexico to Bolivia.

Recent molecular studies have suggested that Maxillaria should be split into several genera, with this species included in the genus Camaridium.
