= Fakahatchee Strand Preserve State Park =

State park in Florida, United States

- IUCN category IV (habitat/species management area)
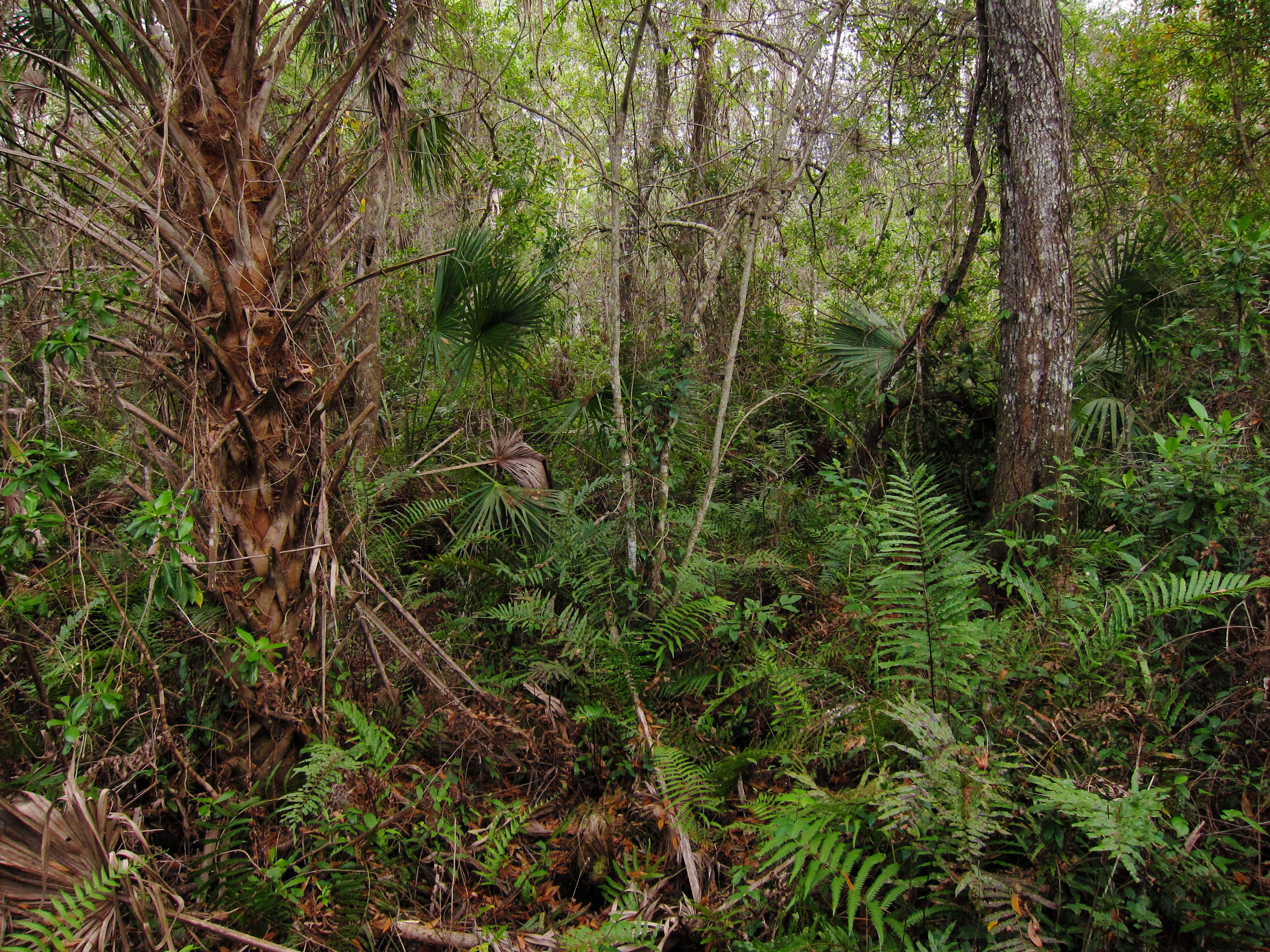
- Undergrowth in the Fakahatchee Strand State Preserve

- Location within Florida Location within the United States
- Interactive map of Fakahatchee Strand Preserve State Park
- Location: Collier County, Florida, US
- Nearest city: Naples, Florida
- Coordinates: 26°00′00″N 81°25′01″W
- Governing body: Florida Department of Environmental Protection

Fakahatchee Strand State Preserve is a Florida State Park in Collier County just west of SR 29 in the Big Cypress Swamp. The park includes most of the Fakahatchee Strand, a thread of forested strand (swamp), as well as mangrove forests and salt marshes in the Ten Thousand Islands.

== Location ==
The Fakahatchee Strand Preserve State Park covers about 125 square miles (320 km^{2}) from Alligator Alley (I-75) south to the Ten Thousand Islands in Collier County, and includes most of the Fakahatchee Strand. The northern end of the strand (north of Alligator Alley) is in the Florida Panther National Wildlife Refuge. The state park includes mangrove forests and salt marshes south of the Tamiami Trail (US 41) in the Ten Thousand Islands that are not part of the Fakahatchee Strand. The state park is 35 miles (56 km) southeast of Naples and 80 miles (130 km) west of Miami. The eastern boundary of the state park is along or close to Florida State Road 29 and just west of the Big Cypress National Preserve. While the Fakahatchee Strand is part of the Big Cypress Swamp, it is not in the national preserve, but has been designated by the state of Florida as part of the Big Cypress Area of Critical State Concern. The Picayune Strand State Forest, also part of the Big Cypress Swamp, is adjacent to the Fakahatchee Strand Preserve State Park to the west.

== Ecology ==
=== Flora ===
Plants found in the park include royal palm, bald cypress, bromeliads, ferns, and orchids.

The preserve contains 44 native orchid species and 14 native bromeliad species. Water in its sloughs and deeper lakes moderates winter temperatures, helping tropical plants survive cold weather.

=== Fauna ===
Among the wildlife of the park are a number of threatened and endangered species: the Florida panther, wood stork, black bear, fox squirrel, and Everglades mink. The park also is home to white-tailed deer, raccoons, opossums, red-shouldered hawks, wild turkeys, owls, and vultures. Alligators, ducks, sandhill cranes, roseate spoonbills, bald eagles, and osprey can be seen in the park.

== Recreational activities ==
Activities include plant and wildlife viewing. Amenities include Janes Scenic Drive, an 11-mile-long unpaved, gravel road, a 2,000 foot boardwalk and guided tours.

== Hours ==
Florida state parks are open between 8 a.m. and sundown every day of the year (including holidays).

== Popular culture ==
The swamp, home of the rare Ghost Orchid (Dendrophylax lindenii), was featured in the book The Orchid Thief by Susan Orlean. The book was the source for Charlie Kaufman's screenplay for the movie Adaptation.

The swamp is featured in an episode of The Finder, where the series protagonist Walter Sherman looks for a missing pilot who disappeared under mysterious circumstances. The pilot's remains and plane were found in the Fakahatchee.
