= Ghost orchid =

Ghost orchid, is a common name for several orchids, and may refer to:

- Dendrophylax lindenii, the American ghost orchid
- Epipogium aphyllum, the Eurasian ghost orchid
