= Sheet flow =

Hydrological phenomenon

Sheet flow is described as overland flow that happens in a continuous sheet, characterized by relatively high frequency and low magnitude, and is limited to conditions of laminar flow.

== Mechanics ==
The concentration of particles usually spreads out in a straight line, and the Rouse distribution works in the water column above the sheet-flow layer where the particles are less concentrated. However, velocity distribution formulas are still being refined to accurately describe particle velocity profiles in steady or oscillatory sheet flows.

== Types ==
Discussion on various types of sheet flows including stagnation flows towards a shrinking sheet, laminar sheet-flow, and their stability and implications. These categories help in understanding the diverse forms and dynamics of sheet flows across different environments.

== Geological significance ==
The role of sheet flows in shaping landscapes, including the formation of alluvial fans and deltas. The distinction between fans built by channelized fluvial and sheet flows and their geomorphological significance is highlighted.

== Challenges in research ==
The complexities involved in studying sheet flows, including the need for advanced modeling techniques to accurately simulate flow dynamics and sediment transport mechanisms. The development and application of new models to describe fine sediment behavior in sheet flows are discussed, reflecting ongoing advancements in this field of research.
