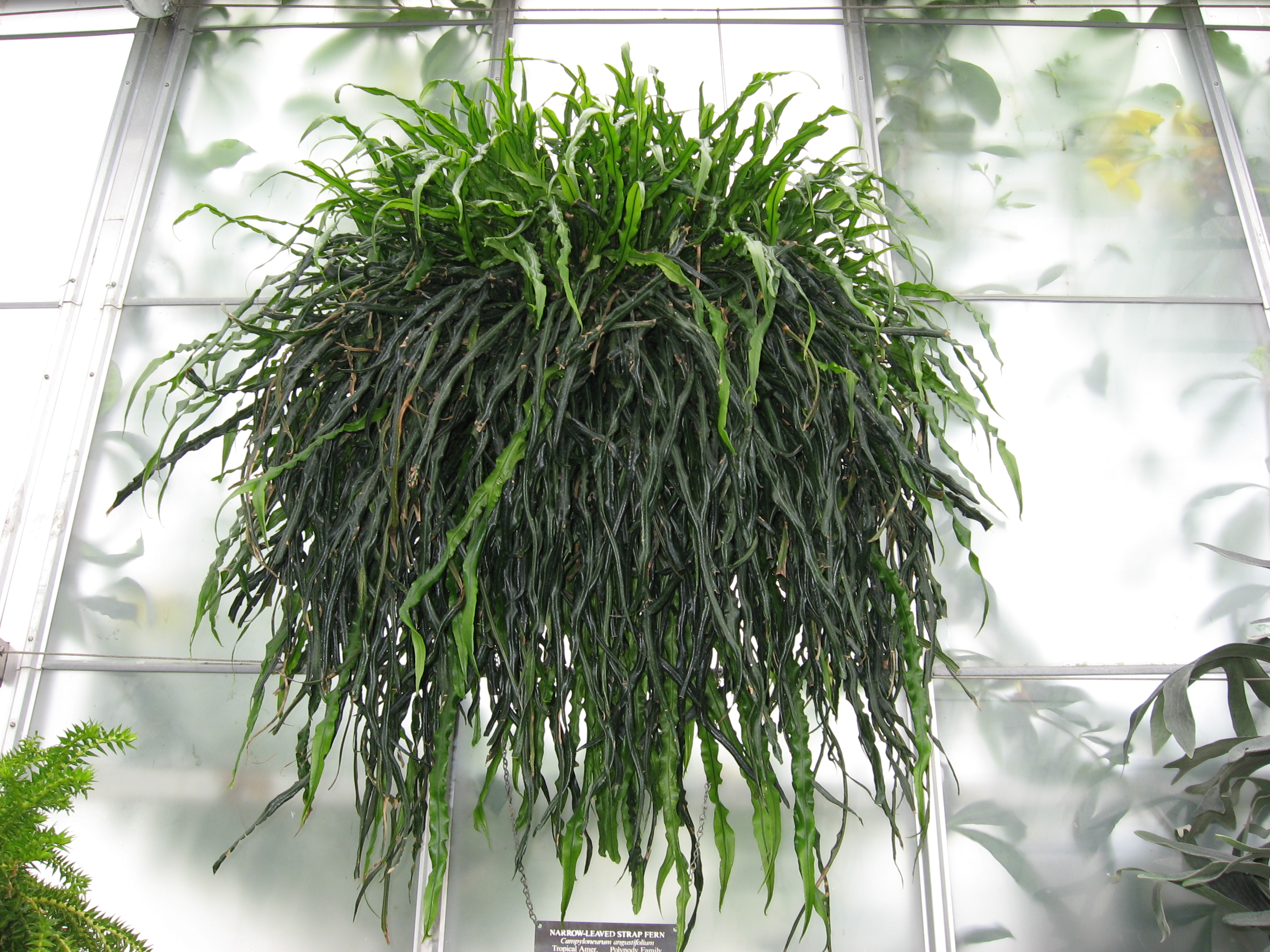

Conservation status
- Apparently Secure (NatureServe)

Scientific classification
- Kingdom: Plantae
- Clade: Embryophytes
- Clade: Tracheophytes
- Division: Polypodiophyta
- Class: Polypodiopsida
- Order: Polypodiales
- Suborder: Polypodiineae
- Family: Polypodiaceae
- Genus: Campyloneurum
- Species: C. angustifolium

Binomial name
- Campyloneurum angustifolium (Sw.) Fée 1852

= Campyloneurum angustifolium =

Species of fern

Campyloneurum angustifolium is a fern species in the family Polypodiaceae, commonly known as narrow strapfern or narrow-leaf strap fern.

It is native to Florida, Puerto Rico, Cuba, Jamaica, Mexico, Mesoamerica, Central America, Kerala, and tropical South America.

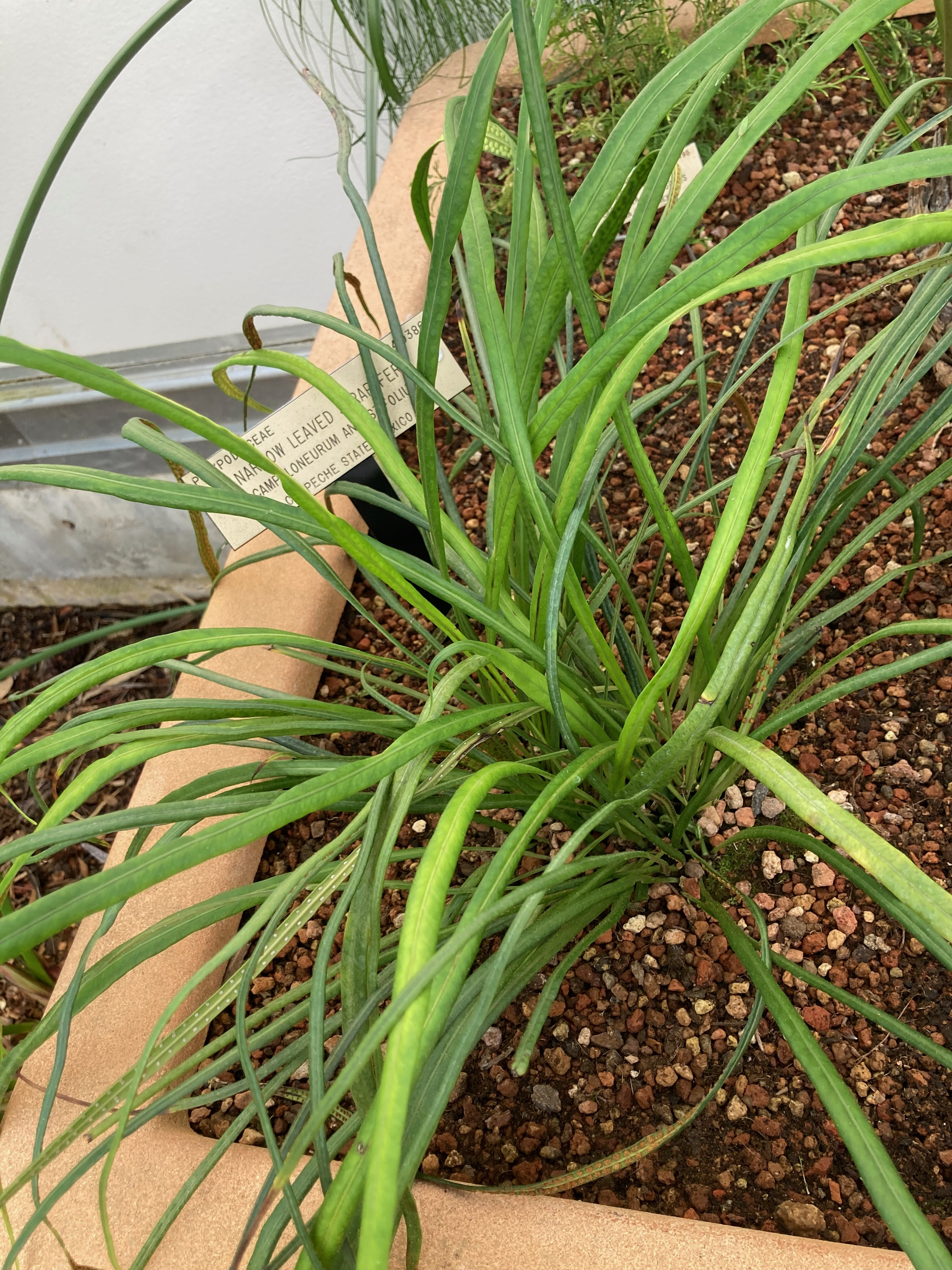
Campyloneurum angustifolium at UC Berkeley Botanical Garden.
