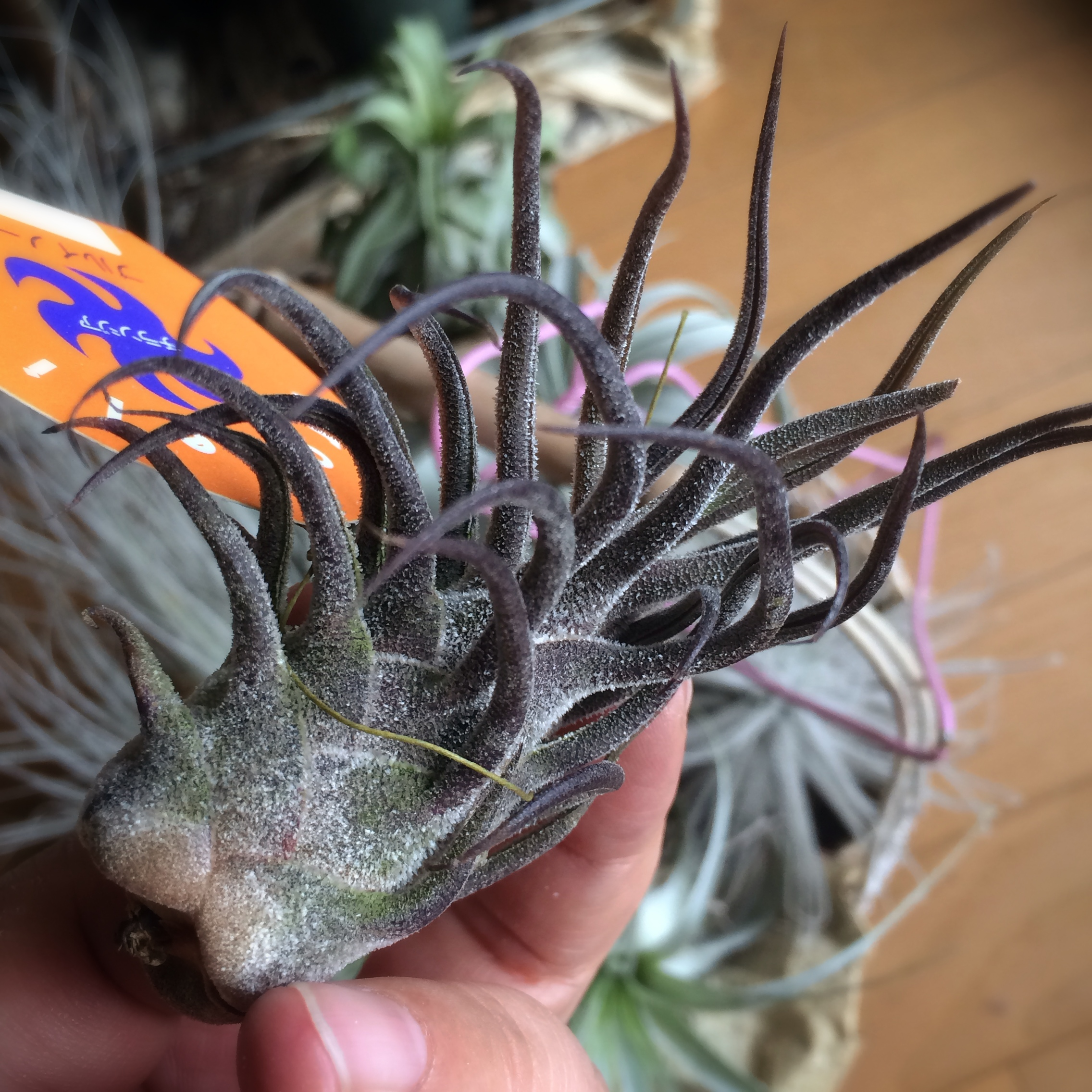

Scientific classification
- Kingdom: Plantae
- Clade: Tracheophytes
- Clade: Angiosperms
- Clade: Monocots
- Clade: Commelinids
- Order: Poales
- Family: Bromeliaceae
- Genus: Tillandsia
- Subgenus: Tillandsia subg. Tillandsia
- Species: T. pruinosa

Binomial name
- Tillandsia pruinosa Baker

Synonyms
- Platystachys pruinosa (Sw.) Beer; Tillandsia breviscapa A.Rich.; Platystachys tortilis Beer; Tillandsia tortilis Klotzsch ex Beer

= Tillandsia pruinosa =

Species of plant

Tillandsia pruinosa, is a species of flowering plant in the family Bromeliaceae. It is commonly known as the fuzzywuzzy airplant. This species is native to northern South America, Central America, southern Mexico, the West Indies and Florida.

== Cultivars ==
- Tillandsia 'Chanza'
- Tillandsia 'Pruinariza'
- Tillandsia 'Sweet Chocolate'
