= Picayune Strand State Forest =

Protected natural area in the U.S. state of Florida

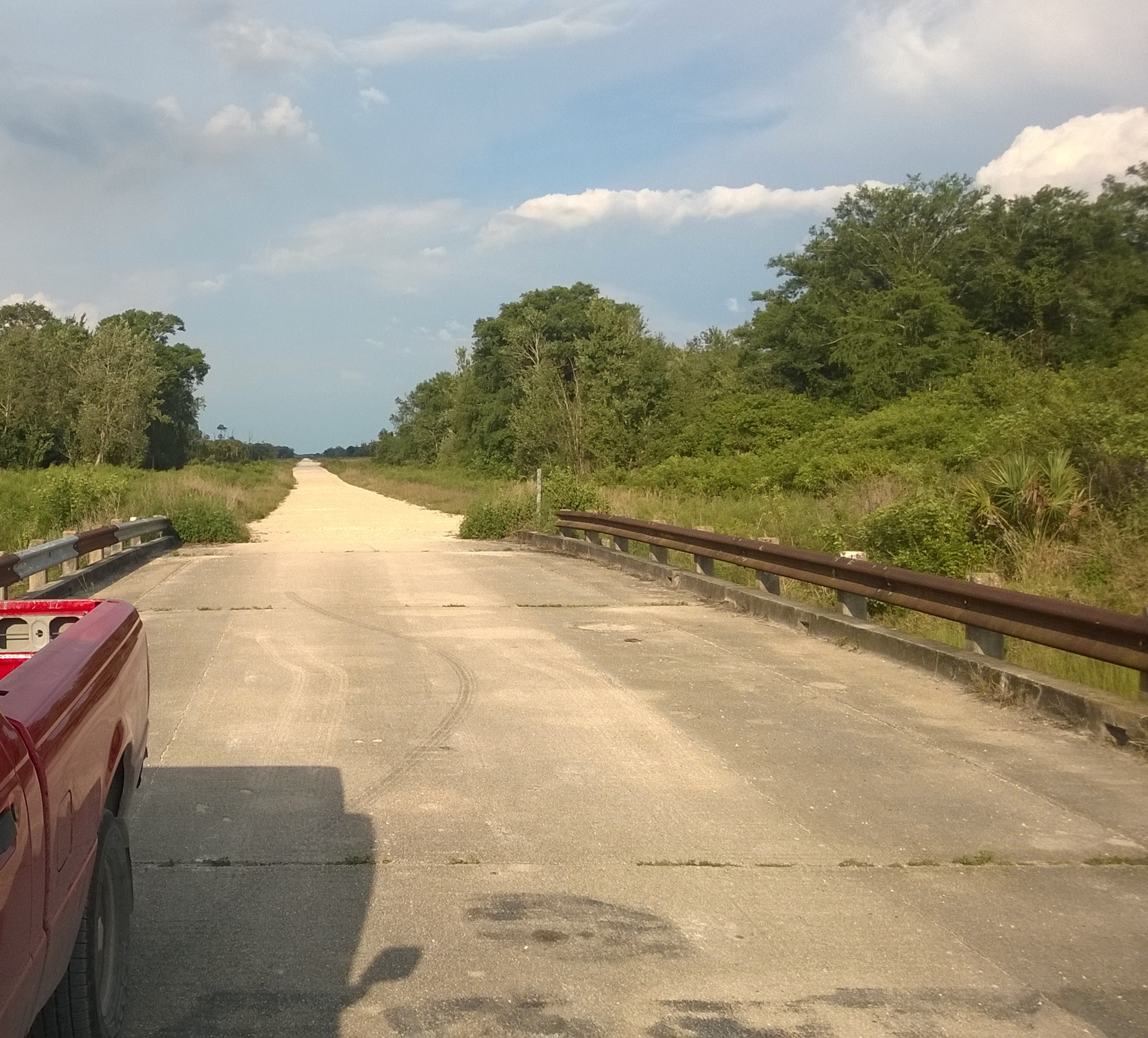
- 100th Ave. in Picayune Strand State Forest

- Map of Collier County in the state of Florida
- Location: Collier County, Florida
- Nearest city: Naples, Florida
- Coordinates: 26°03′22″N 81°30′18″W
- Area: 78,000 acres (320 km^{2})

Picayune Strand State Forest is one of 37 state forests in Florida managed by the Florida Forest Service. The 78,000-acre forest consists primarily of cypress swamps, wet pine flatwoods and wet prairies. It also features a grid of closed roads over part of it, left over from previous land development schemes.

Picayune Strand State Forest is located in southwest Florida in western Collier County, approximately 2 miles (3.2 km) east of the city of Naples. The forest can be accessed via Everglades Boulevard from the north, Jane's Scenic Drive from the east, and Sabal Palm Road from the west. The Picayune Strand State Forest Field Office is located at 2121 52nd Avenue SE, west of Everglades Boulevard S. The Forest is divided into two tracts: the South Golden Gate Estates Tract to the east and the Belle Meade Tract to the west.

== History ==
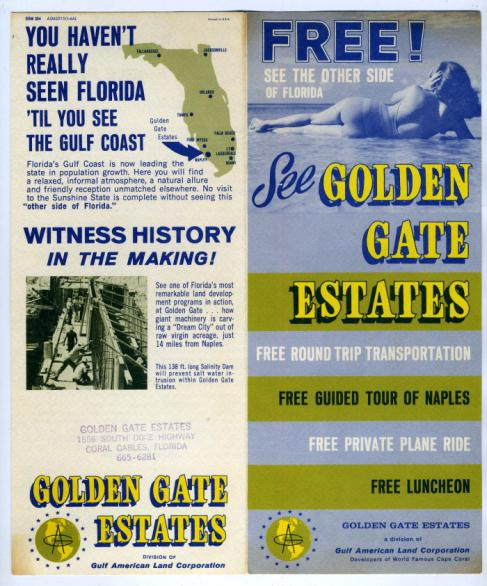
Real estate sales brochure by the Gulf American Land Corp. for Golden Gate Estates

Picayune Strand was logged for cypress trees in the 1940s and 1950s. After logging was complete, the land was purchased by developers and drained for the construction of what was intended to become the largest residential subdivision in the world. This area became the setting for the infamous "swampland in Florida" scam. Potential buyers were shown the land from the air during the dry season, and many lots were sold to people who never saw their land from the ground. Few homes were built in the subdivision named "Golden Gate Estates" created by the Gulf American Land Corporation due to the lack of electricity and high summer water levels.

By the 1970s, it was obvious that the extensive canal system was having an adverse effect on the natural communities of Picayune Strand and associated ecosystems, including Faka Union Bay and the Ten Thousand Islands area. Soon after, state and federal agencies identified the need to restore the hydrology of Picayune Strand and began to develop a plan to achieve this goal. The first parcels of land in Picayune Strand were purchased in 1985 using Conservation and Recreation Lands (CARL) funds under the Save Our Everglades program. This was an incredibly complex undertaking as it involved acquiring land from 17,000 landowners. In 1998, the federal government gave $25 million in aid to the state of Florida to help bring the land acquisitions to a completion. The Picayune Strand State Forest was officially named in May 1995. Its name comes from the largest cypress strand that once covered much of the eastern part of the property.

== Ecological significance and need for restoration ==
The Picayune Strand is critical to the health of the adjacent Everglades ecosystem. Historically, the wetlands that composed the Strand contributed to groundwater recharge and regulated the flow of freshwater through the landscape and into the estuaries to the south. The canal system established in the 1970s altered the hydrology of the Strand and surrounding areas by draining the wetlands and increasing freshwater point source discharges into the estuaries. Consequently, former wetlands were invaded by upland and non-native vegetation and the delicate balance of fresh and saltwater in the estuaries was disrupted. The result was an extensive loss of wildlife habitat. Restoration of Picayune Strand was planned as part of the Comprehensive Everglades Restoration Plan (CERP).

== Natural features ==
Picayune Strand State Forest is in the heart of an ecosystem called the Big Cypress Basin. The majority of this hydric forest is under water during the wet season. The forest is composed of cypress swamps, pine flatwoods and wet prairies in the lowlands and subtropical hardwood hammock in the uplands. The northern section of the Belle Meade Tract contains many second growth South Florida slash pine, with some remnant trees being over 100 years old.

Picayune Strand State Forest provides habitat for many species of wildlife, including many that are threatened or endangered. The following is only a partial list of the species that can be found in the Forest: cougar, red-cockaded woodpecker, black bear, white-tailed deer, wild turkey, bald eagle, wood stork, Big Cypress fox squirrel, and swallow-tailed kite. Although cougars (Florida panthers) are rarely observed, visitors often find panther tracks.

== Recreation ==
Picayune Strand State Forest offers many recreational opportunities. A 22-mile (35 km) equestrian trail winds across the Belle Meade Tract from Miller Boulevard to Benfield Road. All horses in the Forest must have current negative Coggins Test results, proof of which is to be carried by each rider. A primitive equestrian campground equipped with paddocks is located next to the Field Office and trailhead, and an additional oak-shaded primitive campsite is located near the middle of the trail.

The four-mile Sabal Palm Trail is open to hikers and cyclists and can be easily accessed from Sabal Palm Road. The Sabal Palm Trail is part of the Great Florida Birding Trail. Trails are typically flooded during the wet season. Off-highway vehicles such as all-terrain vehicles (ATVs), off-highway motorcycles and swamp buggies are prohibited.

All Forest visitors are required to pay a $2.00 day-use fee. Fees are paid using supplied envelopes at iron ranger stations located throughout the Forest.

== See also ==
- The Orchid Thief
