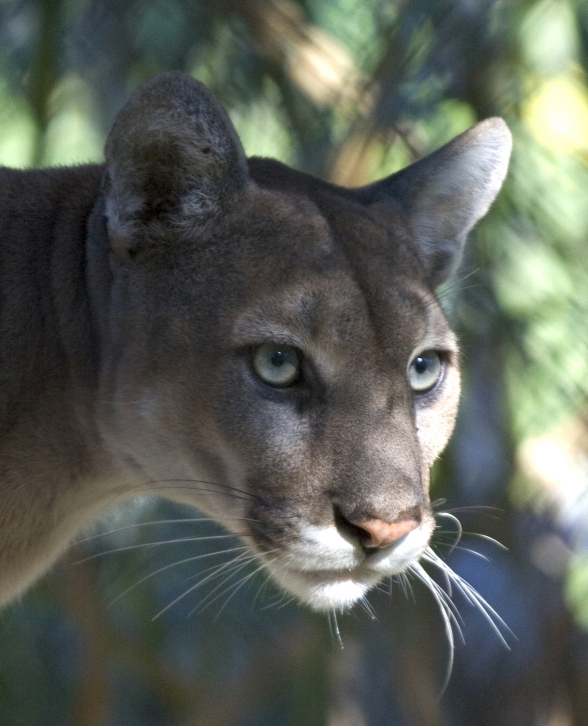
- Close-up of head in Everglades National Park

Conservation status
- Critically Imperiled (NatureServe)

- Endangered (ESA)

Scientific classification
- Kingdom: Animalia
- Phylum: Chordata
- Class: Mammalia
- Order: Carnivora
- Family: Felidae
- Genus: Puma
- Species: P. concolor
- Subspecies: P. c. couguar
- Population: Florida panther
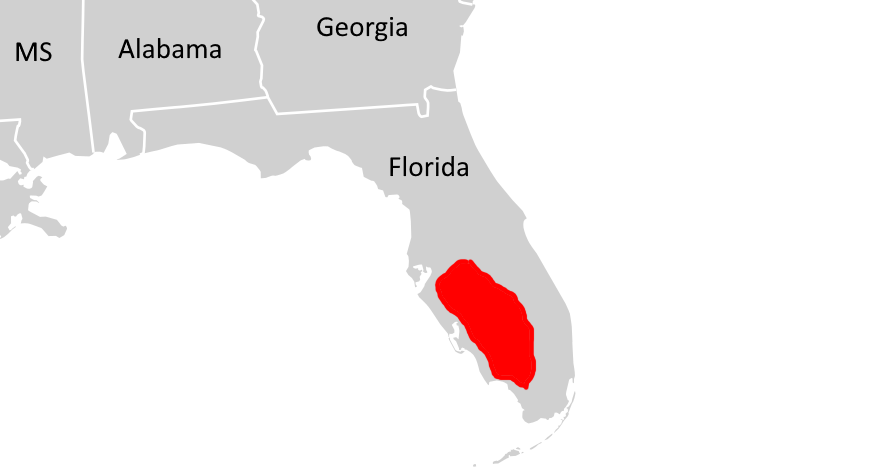
- Range of the Florida panther within the U.S.

Synonyms
- Puma concolor subsp. coryi (Bangs, 1899); Felis concolor subsp. coryi Bangs, 1899

= Florida panther =

Population of cougar endemic to Florida

The Florida panther is a North American cougar (Puma concolor couguar) population in South Florida. It lives in pinelands, tropical hardwood hammocks and mixed freshwater swamp forests. Its range includes the Big Cypress National Preserve, Everglades National Park, Florida Panther National Wildlife Refuge, Picayune Strand State Forest, as well as rural communities in the counties of Collier, Hendry, Hardee, Desoto, Lee, Miami-Dade, and Monroe County. It is the only confirmed cougar population in the Eastern United States, and currently occupies 5% of its historic range. As of 2026, an estimated 120 to 230 individuals are left in the wild.

== Description ==
Florida panthers are spotted at birth, and typically have blue eyes. As the panther grows, the spots fade and the coat becomes completely tan, while the eyes typically take on a yellow hue. The panther's underbelly is a creamy white, and it has black tips on the tail and ears. Florida panthers lack the ability to roar, and instead make distinct sounds that include whistles, chirps, growls, hisses, and purrs. Florida panthers are average-sized for the species, being smaller than cougars from colder climates, but larger than cougars from the tropics. Adult female Florida panthers weigh 29–45.5 kg (64–100 lb), whereas the larger males weigh 45.5–75 kg (100–165 lb). Total length is from 1.8 to 2.2 m (5.9 to 7.2 ft) and shoulder height is 60–70 cm (24–28 in). Male panthers, on average, are 9.4% longer and 33.2% heavier than females because males grow at a faster rate than females and for a longer time.

== Taxonomic status ==
It was described as a distinct cougar subspecies (Puma concolor coryi) in the late 19th century. The Florida panther had for a long time been considered a unique cougar subspecies, with the scientific name Felis concolor coryi proposed by Outram Bangs in 1899. A genetic study of cougar mitochondrial DNA showed that many of the purported cougar subspecies described in the 19th century are too similar to be recognized as distinct. It was reclassified and subsumed to the North American cougar (P. c. couguar) in 2005. Despite these findings, it was still referred to as a distinct subspecies P. c. coryi in 2006.

In 2017, the Cat Classification Taskforce of the Cat Specialist Group revised the taxonomy of Felidae, and now recognises all cougar populations in North America as P. c. couguar.

== Behavior and ecology ==
=== Habitat ===
The Florida panther lives in pinelands, tropical hardwood hammocks and mixed freshwater swamp forests. Its range includes the Big Cypress National Preserve, Everglades National Park, Florida Panther National Wildlife Refuge, Picayune Strand State Forest, as well as rural communities in the counties of Collier, Hendry, Lee, Miami-Dade, and Monroe County. It is the only confirmed cougar population in the Eastern United States, and currently occupies 5% of its historic range. In the 1970s, an estimated 20 Florida panthers remained in the wild, but their numbers had increased to an estimated 230 by 2017.

=== Diet ===
The Florida panther is a large carnivore whose diet consists both of small animals, such as raccoons, armadillos, nutrias, hares, mice, and waterfowl, and larger prey such as storks, white-tailed deer, feral pigs, and small American alligators. The Florida panther is an opportunistic hunter, and has been known to prey on livestock and domesticated animals, including cattle, goats, horses, pigs, sheep, chickens, dogs, and cats. When hunting, panthers shift their hunting environment based on where the prey base is. Female panthers frequently shift both their home range and movement behavior due to their reproductive rates. Male panthers have a home range of around 200 square miles (520 km^{2}) and female panthers have a home range of around 75 square miles (190 km^{2}).

According to a 2022 study from the University of Georgia, Florida panthers are now the main cause of death for white-tailed deer in Southwest Florida. Of 241 deer captured and fitted with GPS collars during the study, 96 were killed by Florida panthers. This shows improved health (and therefore ability to hunt) in the endangered panther population. The panthers are also competing with the Burmese pythons. With the snakes eating the panther's food, it is making it harder for them to hunt and stay alive.

=== Early life ===
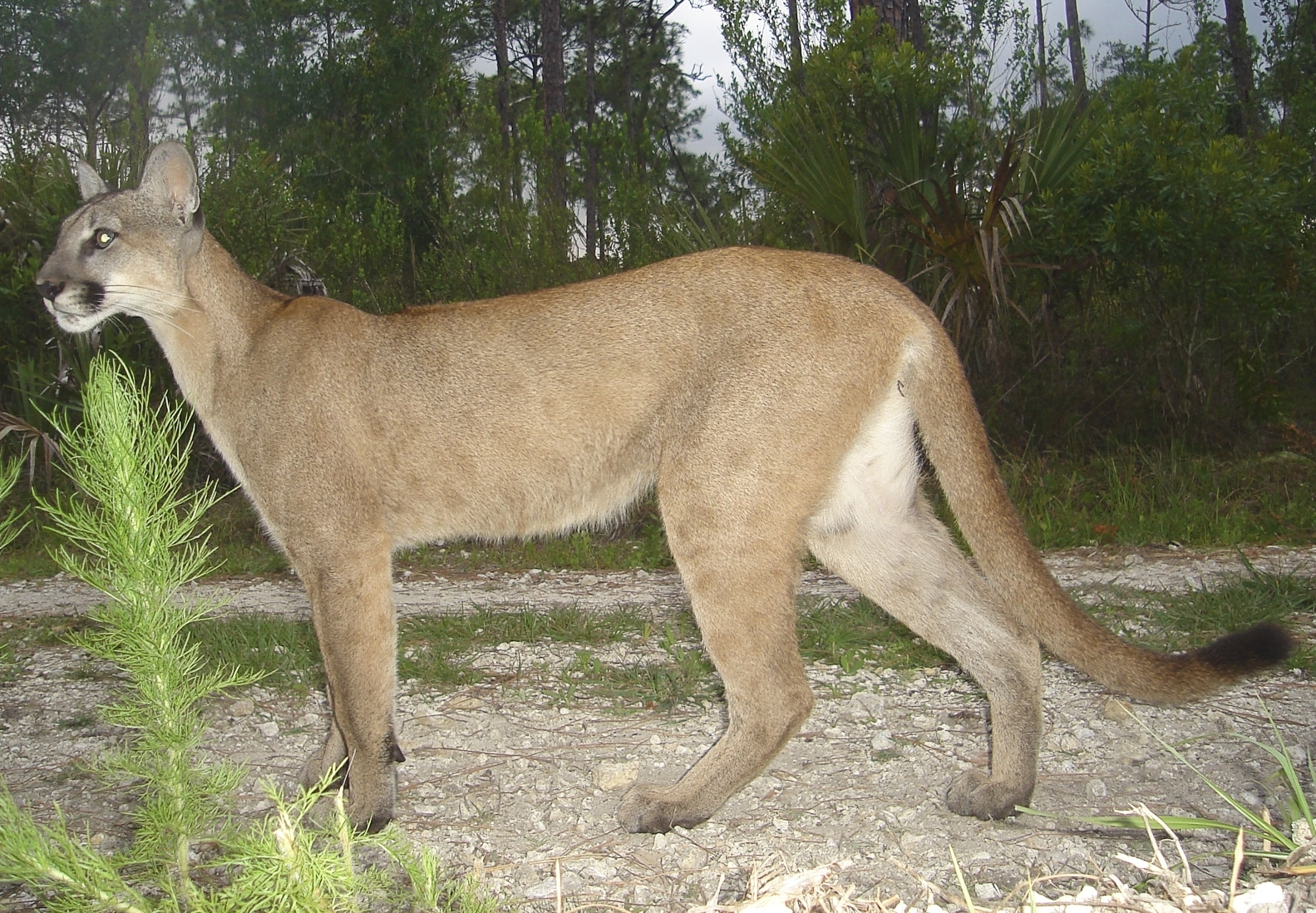
A juvenile

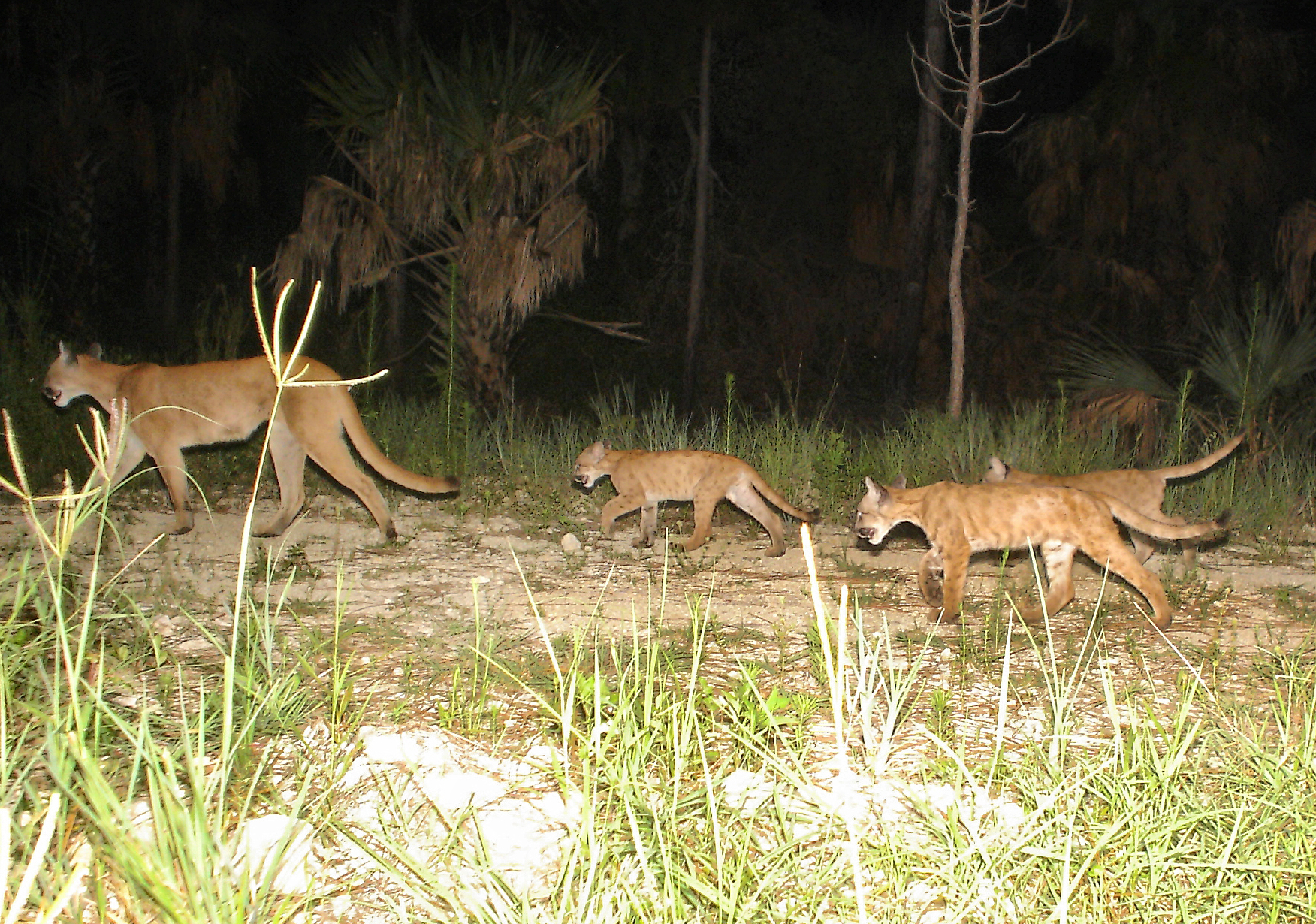
A mother with three cubs

Panther kittens are born in dens created by their mothers, often in dense scrub. The dens are chosen based on a variety of factors, including prey availability, and have been observed in a range of habitats. Kittens will spend the first 6–8 weeks of life in those dens, dependent on their mother. In the first 2–3 weeks, the mother spends most of her time nursing the kittens; after this period, she spends more time away from the den, to wean the kittens and to hunt prey to bring to the den. Once they are old enough to leave the den, they hunt in the company of their mother. Male panthers are not encountered frequently during this time, as female and male panthers generally avoid each other outside of breeding. Kittens are usually 2 months old when they begin hunting with their mothers, and 2 years old when they begin to hunt and live on their own.

=== Lifespan ===
Florida panthers can typically live up to 20 years but some individuals might live longer. Male panthers often have a shorter lifespan due to fights with other panthers over territory and females, and they travel more widely exposing them to accidents such as with vehicles and encounters with people.

== Threats ==
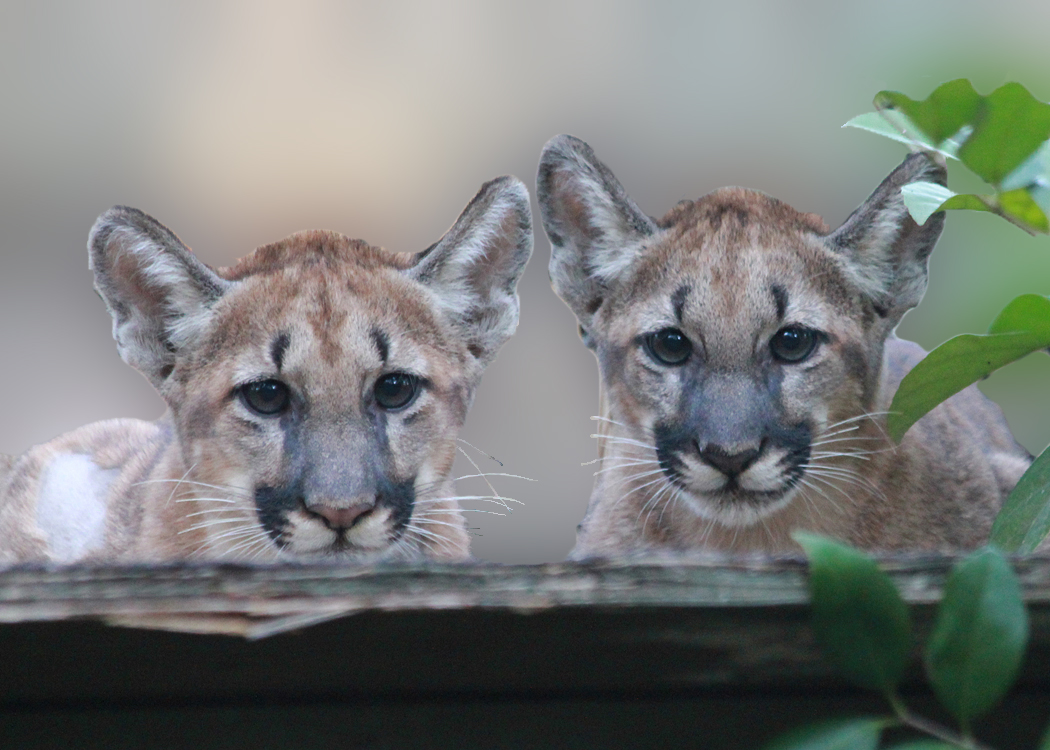
Two young panthers at White Oak in Nassau County, Florida

The biggest threat to the species is habitat loss. The two highest causes of mortality for individual Florida panthers are automobile collisions and territorial aggression between Florida panthers.

=== Habitat loss ===
Primary threats to the population as a whole include habitat loss, habitat degradation, and habitat fragmentation. A crucial requirement for Florida panthers is the need for dense vegetation that provides concealment for resting, hunting, and raising kittens. This vegetation allows panthers to stalk prey, avoid conflicts, and protect their cubs. This loss through development or habitat thinning can directly affect their ability to survive. The FWC explains that even areas with sufficient prey may become unsuitable if vegetation is stripped too thin.

Southern Florida is a fast-developing area, and many developments such as Ave Maria near Naples, have become extremely controversial for their location in prime panther habitat, and for the roads surrounding them that kill panthers at an increasing rate.

Fragmentation by major roads has severely segmented the sexes of the Florida panther, as well. In a study done between 1981 and 2004, most panthers involved in car collisions were found to be male. However, females are much more reluctant to cross roads. Therefore, roads separate habitat, and adult panthers.

The space that they have to travel in has shrunk to 2 million acres. In its place are homes and roads that they have to compete with.

Development, as well as the Caloosahatchee River, are major barriers to natural population expansion. While young males wander over extremely large areas in search of an available territory, females occupy home ranges close to their mothers. For this reason, panthers are poor colonizers and expand their range slowly, despite occurrences of males far away from the core population.

=== Vehicle collisions ===
Vehicle collisions are the leading cause of individual panther mortality. Florida panthers live in home ranges between 190 and 500 square kilometres (73 and 193 mi^{2}). Within these ranges are many roads and human constructions, which are regularly traveled on by Florida panthers and can result in their death by vehicular collision. The number of Florida panthers killed by vehicular collisions has increased in recent years, and traffic collisions were responsible for the majority of recorded panther deaths each year between 2014 and 2021. Males are killed at a higher ratio (60%) because they travel more widely. Eighty-percent of panthers that are killed in vehicle collisions are young, four years of age or less.

=== Intraspecies aggression ===
Territorial aggression between Florida panthers is the second leading cause of individual panther mortality.

=== Competition with invasive snakes ===
Florida's invasive snakes like Burmese pythons are a leading threat to panthers. These snakes are known to consume large animals like deer and alligators. Snakes also eat the animals panthers depend on for their own survival. After the introduction of the pythons, resulting from the exotic pet trade in Florida, large mammals have decreased by an average of 90% since 1990 levels. Specific figures on the decline in panthers is not known.

=== Pollution ===
Exposure to a variety of chemical compounds in the environment has caused reproductive impairment to Florida panthers. Tests show that the differences between males and females in estradiol levels are insignificant, which suggests that males have been feminized due to chemical exposure. Feminized males are much less likely to reproduce, which represents a significant threat to a subspecies that already has a low population count and a high level of inbreeding. Chemical compounds that have created abnormalities in Florida panther reproduction include herbicides, pesticides, and fungicides such as benomyl, carbendazim, chlordecone, methoxychlor, methylmercury, fenarimol, and TCDD.

Mercury pollution poses a serious risk to Florida panthers. Scientists first became aware of the threat in 1989 when a female panther died and was later found to have high concentrations of mercury in her liver. Air pollution from metal-mining and smelting, coal-fired utilities, and incinerators deposit into the Everglades through rainfall. It is converted by bacteria into toxic methylmercury, which builds up in the food chain; from algae and periphyton, to insects, fish, raccoons, and panthers. Because panthers in parts of their range rely on raccoons or fish as a food source, their health is threatened when an abundant amount are consumed.

=== Corruption ===
Financial corruption and political changes pose a significant risk to panthers. According to a 2021 investigative report, "money and politics could doom the Florida panther".

==== David Maehr ====
In 2003, a corruption controversy emerged involving David Maehr, a leading Florida panther expert. Land developers hired Maehr, who then produced scientifically unsound papers that deliberately downplayed the importance of certain lands for panther survival. These flawed studies were then submitted to permitting agencies to justify development and forest-clearing projects, destroying habitat for the Florida panther.

After a whistleblower exposed Maehr's work, federal and state agencies appointed a panel of four experts called the Florida Panther Scientific Review Team (SRT). Tasked with evaluating the science used to guide panther recovery, the SRT identified serious problems with Maehr's literature, including poor citations and misrepresented data used to support unsound conclusions. Subsequently, a Data Quality Act (DQA) complaint was filed by Public Employees for Environmental Responsibility (PEER) and Andrew Eller, a biologist with the U.S. Fish and Wildlife Service (USFWS). The complaint successfully demonstrated that government agencies had continued to use the incorrect information even after it was identified as flawed. As a result of the DQA ruling, the USFWS admitted to errors in the science it was using and reinstated the whistleblower. In two subsequent white papers, environmental groups contended that this reliance on incorrect data had led to improper permitting for habitat development and documented the link between the flawed science and financial conflicts of interest.

David Maehr was hired by developers, and his faulty science research gave those same developers the necessary permitting to clear forests needed by the panthers to retain a viable breeding population. In January 2006, USFWS released a new draft Florida Panther Recovery Plan for public review. The discredited Maehr left Florida and the field of panthers to study black bears in Kentucky; while on sabbatical in 2008, he died in a single-engine prop plane accident while doing a bear survey.

=== Poaching ===
Humans threaten the Florida panther directly through poaching and wildlife control measures.

Florida panthers, usually wandering males, have occurred as vagrants outside of Florida, where they face a much higher risk of mortality. In 2008, a Georgia man was sentenced to two years probation, fined, and handed a hunting ban during his probation for killing a Florida panther that had walked 600 miles (970 km) north to Troup County, Georgia. In 2014, a male panther was shot and killed in the Okefenokee Swamp in Georgia.

In a study using a predator-prey model of Florida panthers, cattle, and white tail deer, the panthers' hunt was found to impact to cattle farmers and the deer hunters in Florida. As of 2024, panthers are an endangered species and thus are protected by international law from hunting. Thus, farmers and hunters must adapt to the small population of panthers in Florida despite potential for human-wildlife conflict.

=== Disease ===
Antigen analysis on select Florida panther populations has shown feline immunodeficiency virus and puma lentivirus among certain individuals. The presence of these viruses is likely related to mating behaviors and territory sympatry. Although, since Florida panthers have lower levels of the antibodies produced in response to FIV, consistently positive results for the presence of infection is difficult to find.

In the 2002–2003 capture season, feline leukemia virus was first observed in two panthers. Further analysis determined an increase in FeLV-positive panthers from January 1990 to April 2007. The virus is lethal, and its presence has resulted in efforts to inoculate the population. While no new cases have been reported since July 2004, the virus does have potential for reintroduction.

In August 2019, Florida's Fish and Wildlife Conservation Commission identified, through the use of game cameras, eight endangered panthers affected by an apparent neurological disorder, but were unable to identify any potential infectious diseases that can affect felines and other species. A disease that affects them as well as bobcats is a weakness in the back legs. As seen on trial cameras, the way that they walk is unsteady.

=== Genetic depletion ===
Prior to the mid-1990s, the biggest threat to the survival of the species was inbreeding. The Florida panther has low genetic diversity due to a variety of environmental and genetic issues, due to having a wild population of about 20 panthers. This resulted in a gradual decline in the population size with subsequent increase in the likelihood of inbreeding depression. The lower genetic diversity and higher rates of inbreeding led to increased deleterious traits in the population, resulting in lower overall fitness of the Florida panther population. This also lowered the adaptive capacity of the population and increased the likelihood of genetic defects such as cryptorchidism and other complications to the heart and immune system. One of the morphological consequences of inbreeding was a high frequency of cowlicks and kinked tails. The frequency of cowlick in a Florida panther population was 94% compared to other pumas at 9%, while the frequency of a kinked tail was 88% as opposed to 27% for other puma subspecies. Due to conservation efforts (see Genetic diversity below) this threat is declining.

=== Human-wildlife conflict ===
There has never been a reported panther attack in Florida. In western states people have been attacked and fought back successfully with rocks, sticks, or even their bare hands.

== Conservation ==
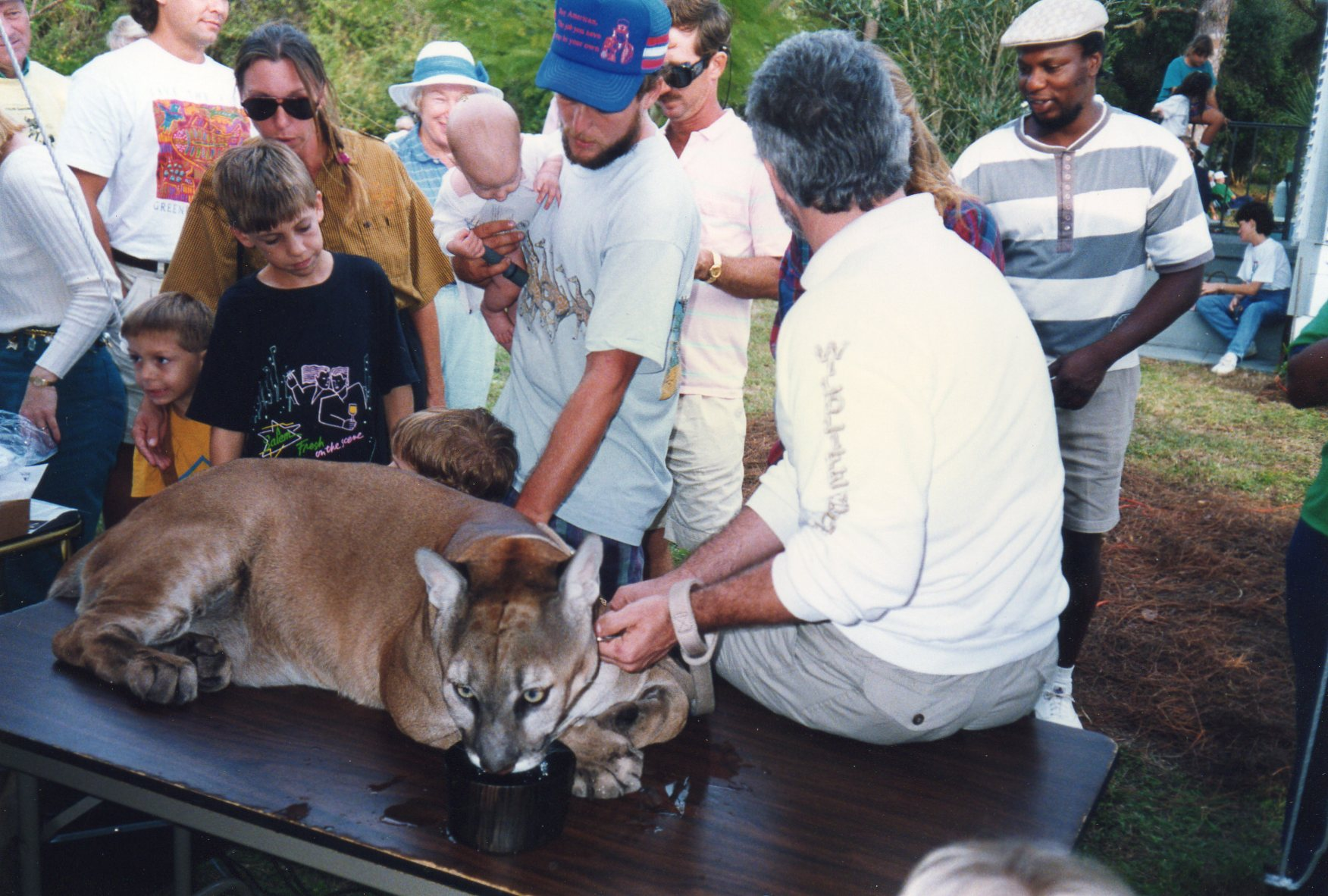
Panther at Audubon's Possum Long Nature Center, Stuart, Florida, September, 1992

=== Conservation programs ===
There are a number of official conservation plans and programs.

The Florida Panther Recovery Plan is the foundational federal-level document for panther conservation, mandated by the Endangered Species Act. First written in 1981 and last fully revised in 2008, it outlines the overarching strategy for the panther's survival and eventual removal from the endangered species list. It is managed by the United States Fish and Wildlife Service.

The Florida Panther Program is run by the Florida Fish and Wildlife Conservation Commission (FWC). It was originally called the Florida Panther Management Plan. It is the primary state-level conservation program. It consists of multiple plans including the Imperiled Species Management Plan, the Florida Panther Conservation Plan run by the Florida Department of Transportation (FDOT), and the Florida Panther Protection Program in eastern Collier County.

Habitat Conservation Plans (HCPs) are legally binding agreements between the USFWS and private entities (like landowners or developers) in South Florida. They are designed to allow for some development while ensuring that the impact on panther habitat is minimized and mitigated, often by preserving and managing other crucial lands.

Florida Panther Conservation Banks are a market-based tool where landowners are given financial incentives to protect and manage panther habitat on their property. They earn "credits" which can be sold to developers to offset habitat loss elsewhere. This helps to secure and maintain corridors and larger landscapes for panthers on private lands.

Recent legal analysis writes that recovery plans require having three self-sustaining Florida panther populations of at least 240 individuals each; a goal that may need genetic-rescue efforts to be successful. Experts suggest that introducing 5–10 pumas from outside populations every few decades could help maintain genetic diversity. The analysis also highlights the need to preserve the largely private Florida Wildlife Corridor and strengthen land-use policies and wildlife crossings to expand panther range.

=== Habitat conservation ===
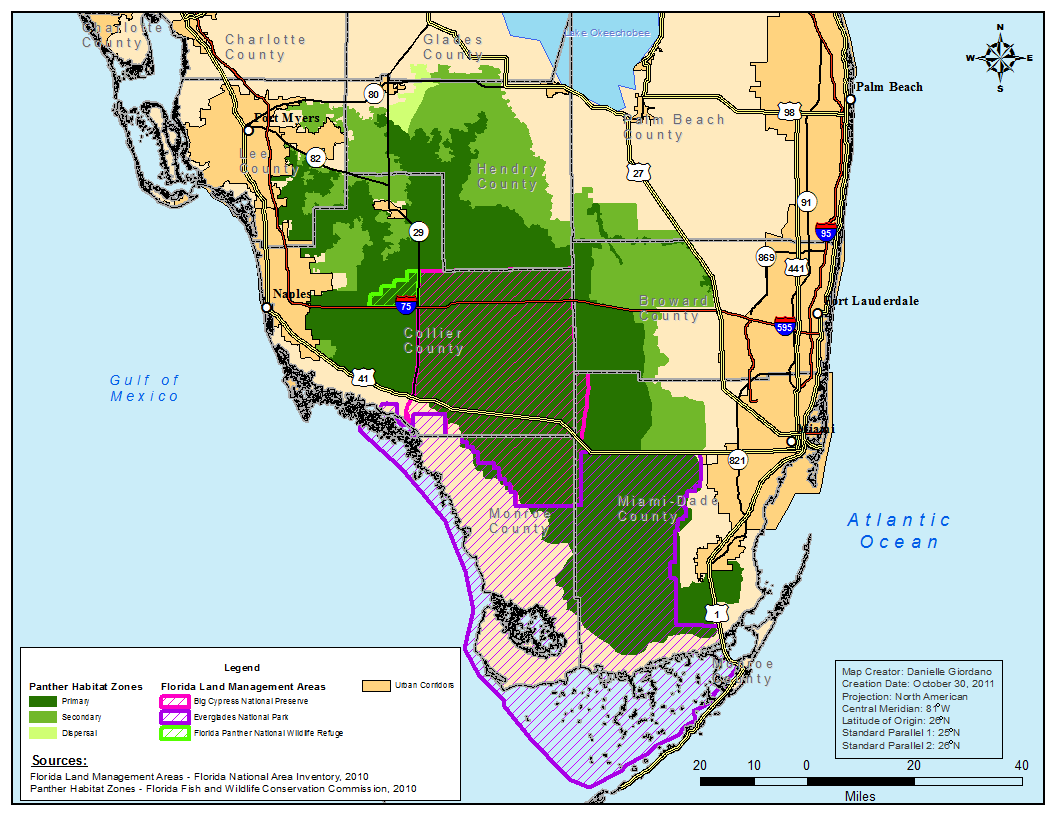
Habitat

The conservation of Florida panther habitats is especially important because they rely on the protection of the forest, specifically hardwood hammock, cypress swamp, pineland, and hardwood swamp. Conservation strategies for Florida panthers tend to focus on their preferred morning habitats. However, GPS tracking has determined that habitat selection for panthers varies by time of day for all observed individuals, regardless of size or gender. They move from wetlands during the daytime to prairie grasslands at night. The implications of these findings suggest that conservation efforts must be focused on the full range of habitats used by Florida panther populations. Female panthers with cubs build dens for their litters in an equally wide variety of habitats, favoring dense scrub, but also using grassland and marshland.

Conservation programs for the Florida panther can sometimes provide financial incentives to private landowners, allowing for further support of panther habitat. Research suggests that cattle ranchers are more likely to participate in these programs when incentive offset the costs of conservation and preserve their autonomy over land use. Cost-share agreements, tax concessions and payments for ecosystem services can encourage habitat protection of Florida panthers.

=== Genetic diversity ===
To increase genetic diversity of the Florida panther, eight pumas from Texas were introduced in the mid-1990s. This genetic rescue worked. It aided in reducing the inbreeding coefficient in the Florida panther population by creating more genetic variation. The results indicated that the survival rates of hybrid kittens were three times higher than those of purebred pumas. Due to the successes of this restoration effort, the genetic depletion of the Florida panther population is now not as much of a problem as it used to be, but is being monitored since the population is still in a fragile condition. Further research on this has been done over a period of forty years that includes the release of these eight pumas from Texas. From the years 1981 to 2021, data was collected from 612 Florida panthers that showed a significant decline in morphological and biomedical abnormalities such as the kinked tail, cowlick, cryptorchidism, and ASD (atrial septum defect). It has improved the genetic diversity of the panther population while keeping them genetically distinct from other populations of large cats. This research has proven that embarking on a genetic rescue for the Florida panther was a worthwhile endeavor that has benefited their population, though the panther still faces extinction threats from habitat loss and poaching. It opens the possibility of this method being used on other endangered species where it is applicable.

Research published in 2022 looked into the impacts of genetic admixture on the build-up of harmful mutations in Florida panthers. Genetic admixture resulted in a reduction in the number of harmful mutations due to lowering the proportion of panthers carrying two copies of specific variants. At the same time, other potentially harmful variants were introduced to Florida panthers due to admixture.

=== Traffic safety ===
Efforts to reduce vehicle collisions with the Florida panther include nighttime speed reduction zones, special roadsides, headlight reflectors, and rumble strips.

Another method of reducing collisions is the creation of wildlife corridors. The first wildlife crossings in Florida were installed in Collier County when the number of Panther deaths caused by vehicular collisions was discovered to have increased significantly since the 1990s. Because wildlife corridors emulate the natural environment, animals are more likely to cross through a corridor rather than a road because a corridor provides more cover for prey and predators, and is safer to cross than a road.

=== Rehabilitation ===
When incidents injure the panthers, federal and Florida wildlife officials take them to White Oak Conservation in Yulee, Florida, for recovery and rehabilitation until they are well enough to be reintroduced. Additionally, White Oak raises orphaned kittens and has done so for 12 individuals. Most recently, an orphaned brother and sister were brought to the center at 5 months old in 2011 after their mother was found dead in Collier County, Florida. After being raised, the male and female were released in early 2013 to the Rotenberger Wildlife Management Area and Collier County, respectively.

=== Endangered status ===
The Florida panther was formerly considered endangered or critically endangered by the IUCN, but it has not been listed since 2008. It was listed as Felis concolor coryi in 1967 under the Endangered Species Preservation Act of 1966, and continues to be protected as an endangered animal under the Endangered Species Act of 1973.

== Significance in culture and economy ==
Many native American tribes of the southeastern United States, including Cherokee, Seminole, and Miccosukee, consider the Florida panther as an animal of "great spiritual importance". Before European settlement, mountain lions occupied almost all of North America. Early settlers feared the animals and used a variety of names (such as “tygers,” lions, leopards, pumas, and catamounts) before eventually being recognized as New World cats.

Widespread hunting and trapping by settlers eventually eradicated them from the eastern United States except for a small population that survived in southwest Florida. In 1887, the state of Florida offered a bounty of $5 per panther pelt, the equivalent of over $150 in today’s dollars.

The panther has been a unique symbol in the state of Florida and for the United States. In 1982, the Florida panther was chosen by a vote of students throughout the state as the Florida state animal. The animal is the namesake of the Florida Panthers hockey team. In 2023, the Florida panther was featured on a United States Postal Service forever stamp as part of the Endangered Species set, based on a photograph from Joel Sartore's Photo Ark. The stamp was dedicated at a ceremony at the National Grasslands Visitor Center in Wall, South Dakota.

The Florida panther was also prominently featured in the 2022 documentary Path of the Panther, which highlights conservation efforts to protect it and share the importance of preserving wildlife corridors in Florida. The film played a role in raising public awareness and influencing the passage of the Florida Wildlife Corridor Act.
