= Altrincham Grammar School =

Altrincham Grammar School may refer to:

- Altrincham Grammar School for Boys
- Altrincham Grammar School for Girls
