= Everglades mink =

Conservation status
- Imperiled (NatureServe)

Scientific classification
- Kingdom: Animalia
- Phylum: Chordata
- Class: Mammalia
- Order: Carnivora
- Family: Mustelidae
- Genus: Neogale
- Species: N. vison
- Subspecies: N. v. evergladensis

Trinomial name
- Neogale vison evergladensis (Hamilton, 1948)

Synonyms
- Mustela vison evergladensis Hamilton, 1948; Neovison vison evergladensis (Hamilton, 1948)

Subspecies of mink

The Everglades mink (Neogale vison evergladensis) is a subspecies of the American mink (Neogale vison) native to the southern tip of Florida.

== Classification ==
The Everglades mink was first described as Mustela vison evergladensis in 1948 based on a single roadkill specimen. While traditionally considered to be its own subspecies, a 1989 study could not support the retention of the subspecies evergladensis, classifying it instead as a disjunct population of the subspecies mink. More recent genetic analysis has found N. v. evergladensis to be distinct and diagnosable from other subspecies, including N. v. mink, and supports its subspecies status.

== Distribution ==
Everglades mink inhabit the Fakahatchee Strand, Big Cypress Swamp, and the freshwater marshes of the Everglades in Florida's Collier, Miami-Dade, and Monroe counties. Historically, it has been difficult to determine precise range of the Everglades mink as sightings are relatively rare. There was no record of Everglades mink occurrence within Everglades National Park from 1996 until 2011, when hair from an Everglades mink was found among the stomach contents of an American alligator in the park, confirming their continued presence there.

== Description ==
Everglades mink are notably smaller than southern mink and Florida mink. They typically reach a length of roughly 20 inches and a weight of 1.5 to 3.5 pounds. Everglades mink sport a silky dark brown coat of fur, often with white spots on the chin and chest. Their fur is softer and darker than that of the Florida mink.

== Behavior ==
Unlike temperate subspecies of American mink which breed in winter or spring, Everglades mink breed in autumn. They have an average gestation period of 51 days and an average litter size of four kits, which are typically weaned once they are five or six weeks old.

== Threats ==
The Everglades mink is the only American mink subspecies that is designated as threatened in the state of Florida. The subspecies faces serious pressure from factors such as changes in the natural water levels in the Everglades, encroachment of agricultural and urban areas into natural habitats, bioaccumulation of mercury, diseases such as canine distemper virus, invasive species such as the Burmese python, and the impact of climate change on the length of the wet season.
