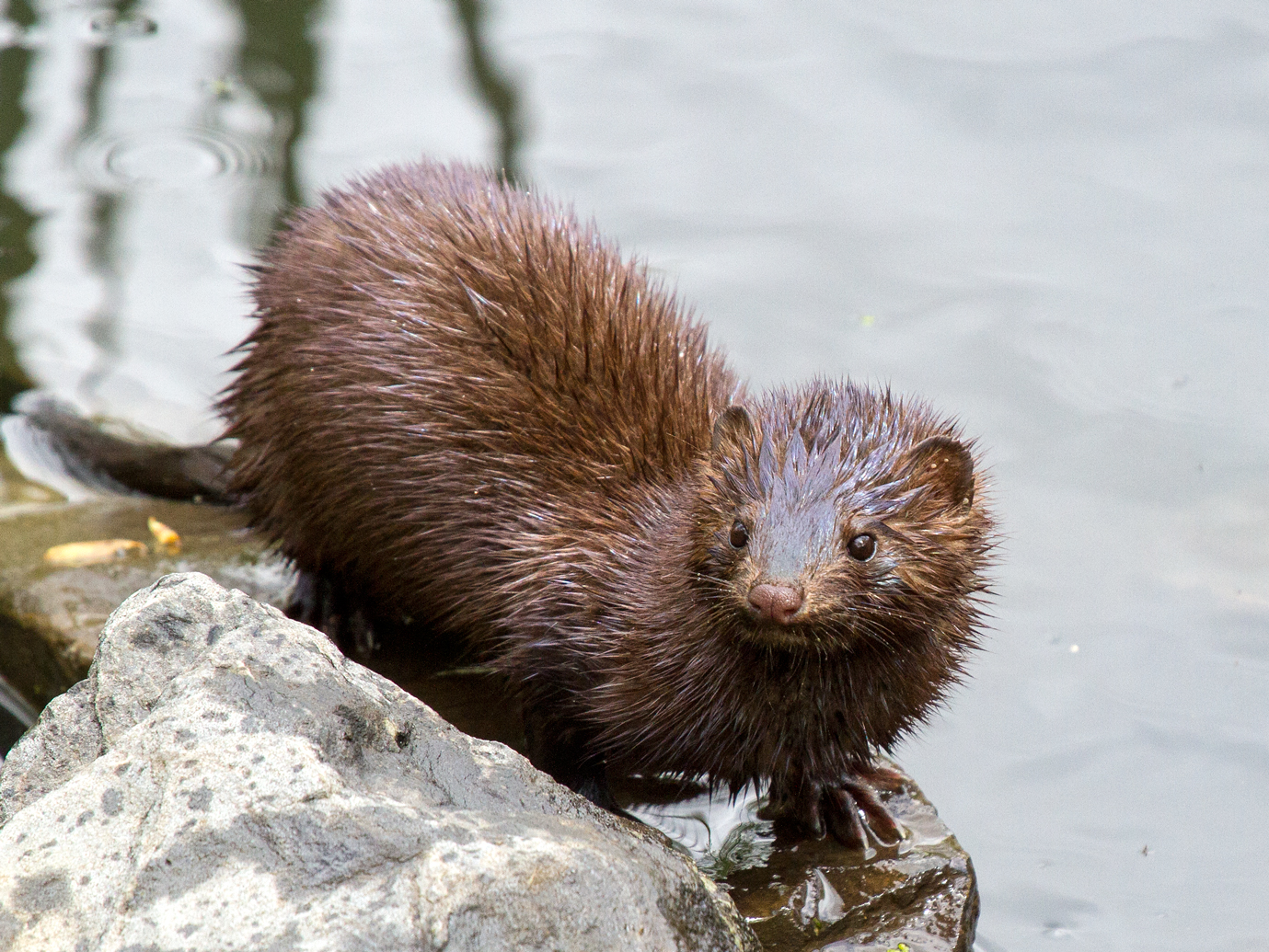
- Near Capisic Pond, Portland, Maine

Conservation status
- Least Concern (IUCN 3.1)

Scientific classification
- Kingdom: Animalia
- Phylum: Chordata
- Class: Mammalia
- Order: Carnivora
- Family: Mustelidae
- Genus: Neogale
- Species: N. vison

Binomial name
- Neogale vison (Schreber, 1777)

Subspecies
- 15, see text
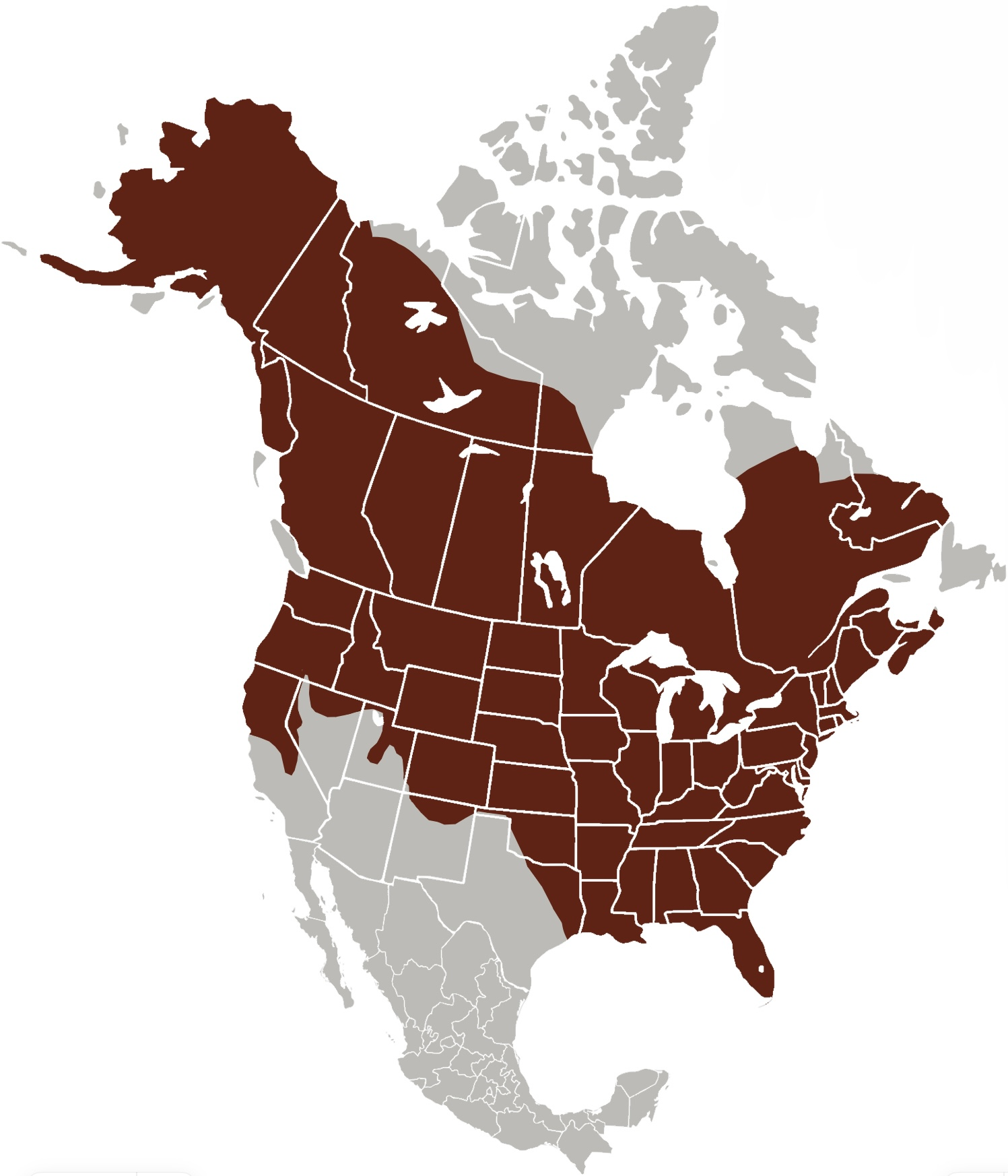
- American mink range in North America
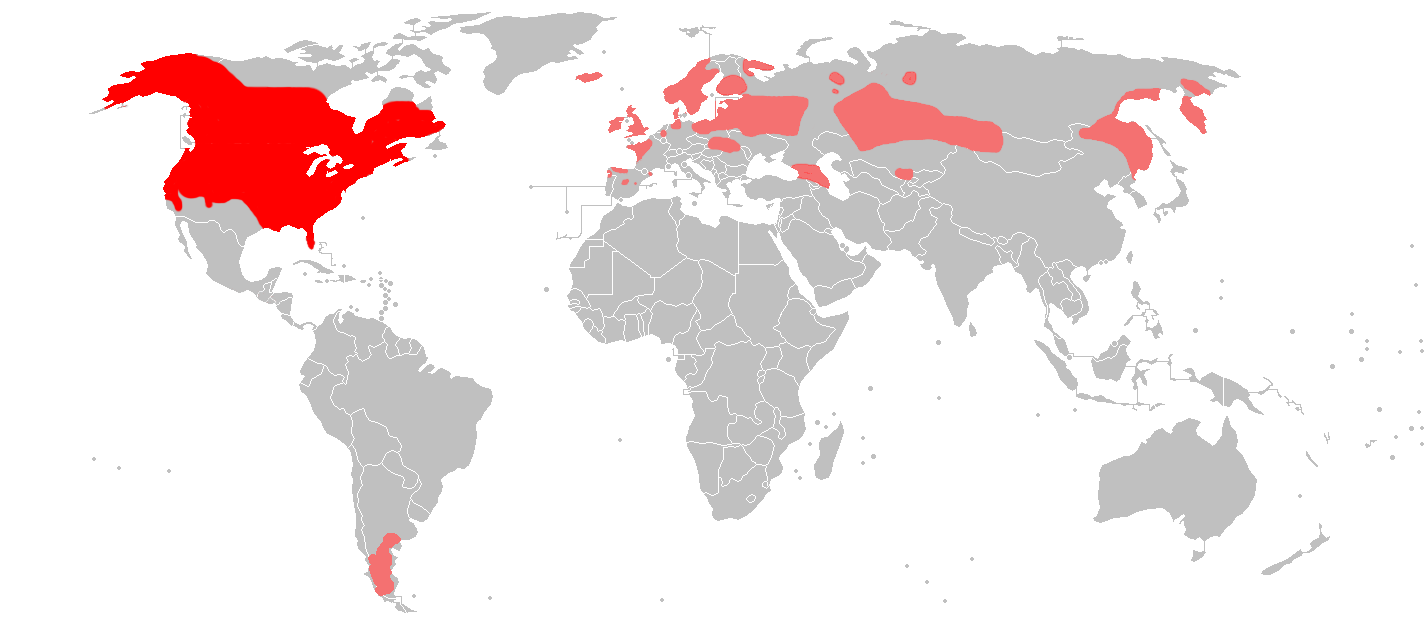
- Native (red) and introduced (pink) range of American mink

Synonyms
- Mustela vison; Vison vison; Neovison vison

= American mink =

Semiaquatic species of mustelid

The American mink (Neogale vison) is a semiaquatic species of mustelid native to North America, though human introduction has expanded its range to many parts of Europe, Asia, and South America. Because of range expansion, the American mink is classed as a least-concern species by the IUCN. The American mink was formerly thought to be the only extant member of the genus Neovison following the extinction of the sea mink (N. macrodon), but recent studies, followed by taxonomic authorities, have reclassified it and the sea mink within the genus Neogale, which also contains a few New World weasel species. The American mink is a carnivore that feeds on rodents, fish, crustaceans, frogs, and birds. In its introduced range in Europe it has been classified as an invasive species linked to declines in European mink, Pyrenean desman, and water vole populations. It is the animal most frequently farmed for its fur, exceeding the silver fox, sable, marten, and skunk in economic importance.

== Evolution ==
As a species, the American mink represents a more specialized form than the European mink in the direction of carnivory, as indicated by the more developed structure of the skull. Fossil records of the American mink go back as far as the Irvingtonian, though the species is uncommon among Pleistocene animals. Its fossil range corresponds with the species' current natural range. The American minks of the Pleistocene did not differ much in size or morphology from modern populations, though a slight trend toward increased size is apparent from the Irvingtonian through to the Illinoian and Wisconsinan periods.

Although superficially similar to the European mink, studies indicate the European mink's closest relative is the Siberian weasel (kolonok) of Asia. The American mink has been recorded to hybridize with European minks and polecats in captivity, though the hybrid embryos of the American and European minks are usually reabsorbed.

=== Subspecies ===
As of 2005, 15 subspecies are recognised:

Subspecies	Trinomial authority	Description	Range	Synonyms
Eastern or little black mink N. v. vison (Nominate subspecies)	Schreber, 1777	The smallest subspecies	Eastern Canada, west to Hudson Bay; south in the interior to the Catskill Mountains, New York and to northern Pennsylvania	altaica (Ternovskii, 1958) borealis (Brass, 1911) nigrescens (Audubon and Bachman, 1854) tatarica (Popov, 1949) winingus (Baird, 1858)
California lowland mink N. v. aestuarina	Ginnell, 1916	Resembles N. v. energumenos, but smaller and has paler, less dense fur	The lowlands of west-central California; west to Petaluma and Marin Counties	
Aniak mink N. v. aniakensis	Burns, 1964			
Western or Pacific mink N. v. energumenos	Bangs, 1896	A small and dark-coloured subspecies with dark sooty-brown fur. Males measure 24 inches (61 cm) in total length and 8.2 inches (21 cm) in tail length.	Western North America, from British Columbia south to the Sierra Nevada Mountains in California and the Rocky Mountains in New Mexico	
Vancouver Island mink N. v. evagor	Hall, 1932			
Everglades mink N. v. evergladensis	Hamilton, 1948		The southern tip of Florida	
Alaskan mink N. v. ingens	Osgood, 1900	The largest subspecies, it resembles N. v. energumenos, but is lighter in colour. Males measure 28.8 inches (73 cm) in total length and 7.2 inches (18 cm) in tail length.	Northern, western and central Alaska; the northern Yukon and the northwestern Mackenzie Mountains; south to the Alaska Peninsula and to Fort Good Hope	
Hudson Bay mink N. v. lacustris	Preble, 1902	It has dark chocolate-brown fur above with white on the chin and irregularly distributed on the breast and between the hind legs. Males measure 27 inches (69 cm) in total length and 8 inches (20 cm) in tail length.	The interior of Canada from Great Bear Lake and the western shores of Hudson Bay south through Alberta, Saskatchewan and Manitoba to southern North Dakota	
Mississippi Valley mink N. v. letifera	Hollister, 1913	It has a light brown coat with white spots on the chin, throat and breast. Males measure 26 inches (66 cm) in total length and 9.4 inches (24 cm) in tail length.	Northern Wisconsin and northern South Dakota south to northern Illinois, northern Missouri and southern Kansas	
East Canadian mink N. v. lowii	Anderson, 1945			
Atlantic salt marsh mink or Florida Mink; N. v. lutensis	Bangs, 1898	A medium-sized subspecies, it has a pale russet to clay- or reddish-brown coat. Males measure 23 inches (58 cm) in total length and 8 inches (20 cm) in tail length.	The coasts of the southeastern United States from South Carolina to Florida	
Kenai mink N. v. melampeplus	Elliot, 1904	Darker than energumenos, it has dark chocolate-coloured fur with slightly paler underparts and a white spot on the chin. Males measure 28 inches (71 cm) in total length and 7.2 inches (18 cm) in tail length.	The Kenai Peninsula and Cook Inlet	
Common mink N. v. mink	Peale and Palisot de Beauvois, 1796	A larger and more robust form than N. v. vison; it has similar colouration. Males measure 25.5 inches (65 cm) in total length and 8.5 inches (22 cm) in tail length.	The Eastern United States, from the coast of New England south to North Carolina and in the interior to central Georgia and Alabama; westward through southern Pennsylvania and Ohio to Missouri and northeastern Texas	lutreocephala (Harlan, 1825) rufa (Hamilton-Smith, 1858)
Island mink N. v. nesolestes	Heller, 1909	Intermediate in size between N. v. ingens and N. v. energumenos, it has rather dark fur. The fur is Van Dyke brown, lighter on the cheeks and sides and darker on the tail. The underparts are walnut brown and white on the chin, with irregular white spots or areas on the throat, chest, inner legs and abdomen. Males measure 24.5 inches (62 cm) in total length and 7.3 inches (19 cm) in tail length.	Admiralty Island in the Alexander Archipelago	
Southern mink N. v. vulgivaga	Bangs, 1895	It resembles N. v. mink, but is paler and smaller, with rich and lustrous light brown fur which darkens at the end of the tail. Males measure 24.5 inches (62 cm) in total length and 7.5 inches (19 cm) in tail length.	The coasts of Louisiana and Mississippi	

== Genomics ==
A chromosome-level genome assembly of Neogale vison was published in 2022. The gap-free assembly spans approximately 2.7 Gb, with 98.6% of the sequence assigned to 15 chromosomes, and has a BUSCO completeness score of 96.5%. It contains 25,377 predicted genes. A haplotype-resolved chromosome-scale assembly was published in 2025 from a female specimen collected in England. The two haplotypes span approximately 2.7 Gb each, with 98.7% of each haplotype assigned to 15 chromosomal pseudomolecules, including the X chromosome. The primary haplotype has a BUSCO completeness score of 94.9%, and genome annotation identified 19,566 predicted protein-coding genes.

== Description ==
=== Build ===
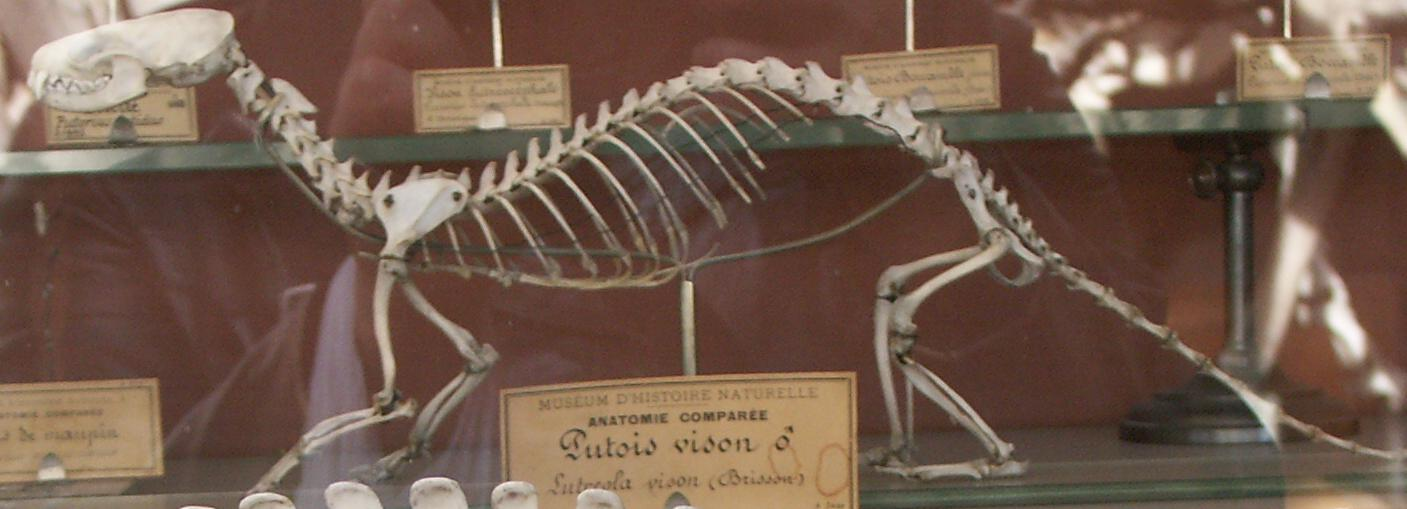
Skeleton of an American mink from the Muséum national d'histoire naturelle

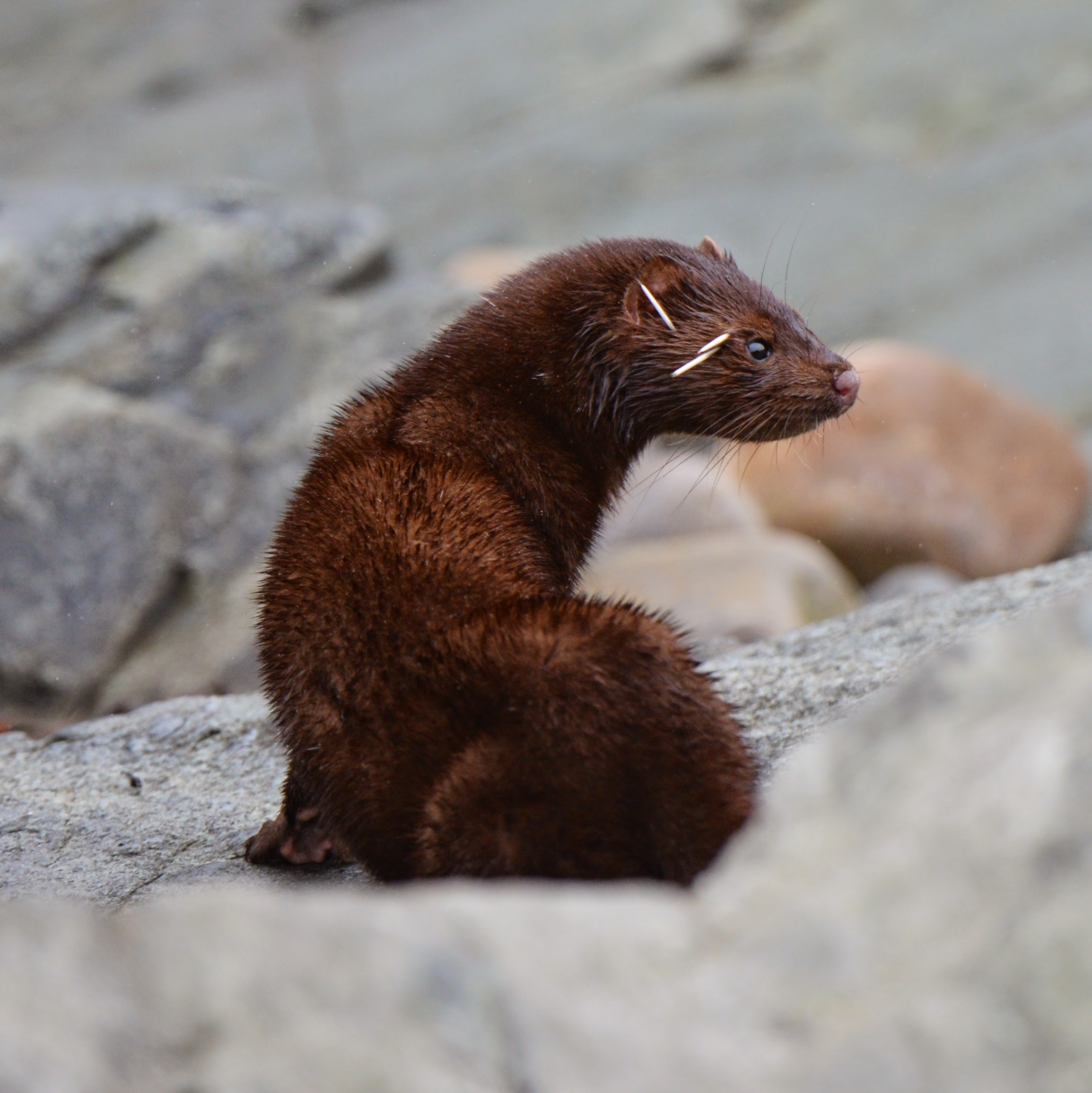
American mink with porcupine quills in its face. Yarmouth, Nova Scotia

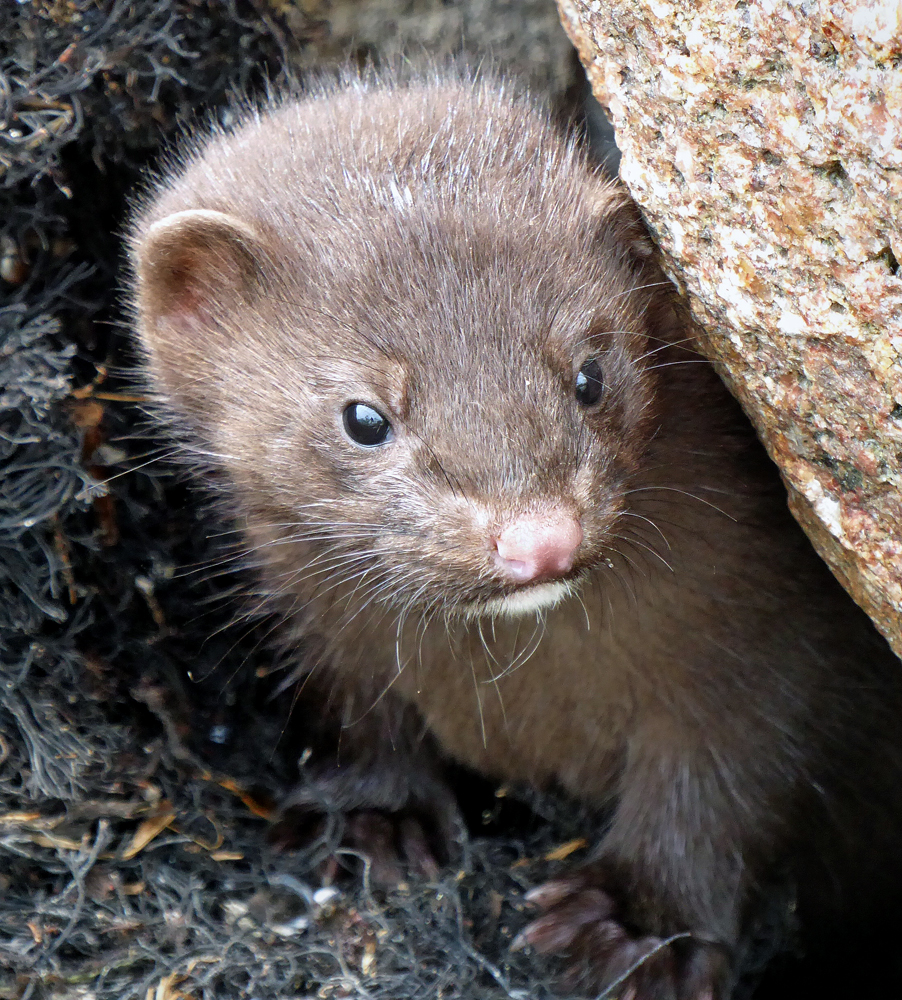
A juvenile American mink.

The American mink differs from members of the genus Mustela (stoats and weasels), as well as the other members of Neogale, by its larger size and stouter form, which closely approach those of martens. It shares with martens a uniformly enlarged, bushy and somewhat tapering tail, rather than a slender, cylindrical tail with an enlarged bushy tip, as is the case in stoats. The American mink is similar in build to the European mink, but the tail is longer (constituting 38–51% of its body length).

The American mink has a long body, which allows the species to enter the burrows of prey. Its streamlined shape helps it to reduce water resistance while swimming. The skull is similar to that of the European mink, but is more massive, narrower, and less elongated, with more strongly developed projections and a wider, shorter cranium. The upper molars are larger and more massive than those of the European mink. The dental formula is 3.1.3.13.1.3.2.

Domestic mink, which are bred in fur farms and are substandard genetically, have 19.6% smaller brains, 8.1% smaller hearts, and 28.2% smaller spleens than wild mink. The feet are broad, with webbed digits. They generally have eight nipples, with one pair of inguinal teats and three pairs of abdominal teats. The adult male's penis is 2.2 in (5.6 cm) long, and is covered by a sheath. The baculum is well-developed, being triangular in cross section and curved at the tip.

Males measure 13–18 in (34–45 cm) in body length, while females measure 12–15 in (31–37.5 cm). The tail measures 6–10 inches (15.6–24.7 cm) in males and 6–8 in (14.8–21.5 cm) in females. Weights vary with sex and season, with males being heavier than females. In winter, males weigh 1–3 lb (500–1,580 g) and females 1–2 lb (400–780 g). Maximum heaviness occurs in autumn.

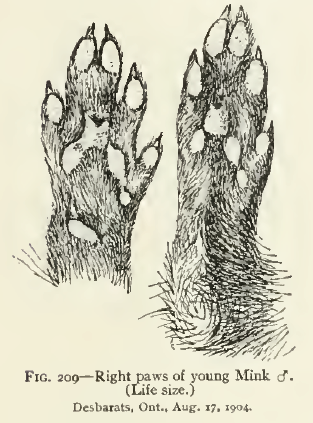
American mink paws, as illustrated by Ernest Thompson Seton

=== Fur ===
The American mink's winter fur is denser, longer, softer, and more close-fitting than that of the European mink. The winter fur's tone is generally very dark blackish-tawny to light-tawny. Colour is evenly distributed over all the body, with the under side being only slightly lighter than the back. The guard hairs are bright and dark-tawny, often approaching black on the spine. The underfur on the back is very wavy and greyish-tawny with a bluish tint. The tail is darker than the trunk and sometimes becomes pure black on the tip. The chin and lower lip are white. Captive individuals tend to develop irregular white patches on the lower surface of their bodies, though escaped individuals from Tartaria gradually lost these patches. The summer fur is generally shorter, sparser and duller than the winter fur. The thick underfur and oily guard hairs render the pelage water-resistant, with the length of the guard hairs being intermediate between those of otters and polecats, thus indicating the American mink is incompletely adapted to an aquatic life. It moults twice a year, during spring and autumn. It does not turn white in winter. A variety of different colour mutations have arisen from experimental breeding on fur farms.

=== Locomotion ===
On land, the American mink moves by a bounding gait, with speeds of up to 6.5 km/h (4.0 mph). It also climbs trees and swims well. During swimming, the mink propels itself primarily through undulating movements of the trunk. When diving, it undergoes bradycardia, which is likely an adaptation to conserve oxygen. In warm water (24 °C (75 °F)), the American mink can swim for 3 hours without stopping, but in cold water it can die within 27 minutes. It generally dives to depths of 12 in (30 cm) for 10 seconds, though depths of 3 m lasting 60 seconds have been recorded. It typically catches fish after five- to 20-second chases.

=== Senses and scent glands ===
The American mink relies heavily on sight when foraging. Its eyesight is clearer on land than underwater. Its auditory perception is high enough to detect the ultrasonic vocalisations (1–16 kHz) of rodent prey. Its sense of smell is comparatively weak. Its two anal glands are used for scent marking, either through defecation or by rubbing the anal region on the ground. The secretions of the anal glands are composed of 2,2-dimethyl thietane, 2-ethylthietane, cyclic disulfide, 3,3-dimethyl-1,2-dithiacyclopentane, and indole. When stressed, the American mink can expel the contents of its anal glands at a distance of 12 in (30 cm). Scent glands may also be located on the throat and chest. The smell produced by these scent glands was described by Clinton Hart Merriam as more unbearable than that produced by skunks, and added it was "one of the few substances, of animal, vegetable, or mineral origin, that has, on land or sea, rendered me aware of the existence of the abominable sensation called nausea".

== Behavior ==
=== Social and territorial behaviours ===
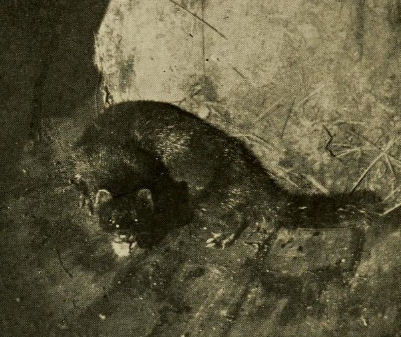
Southern mink (N. v. vulgivagus) in a threatening posture

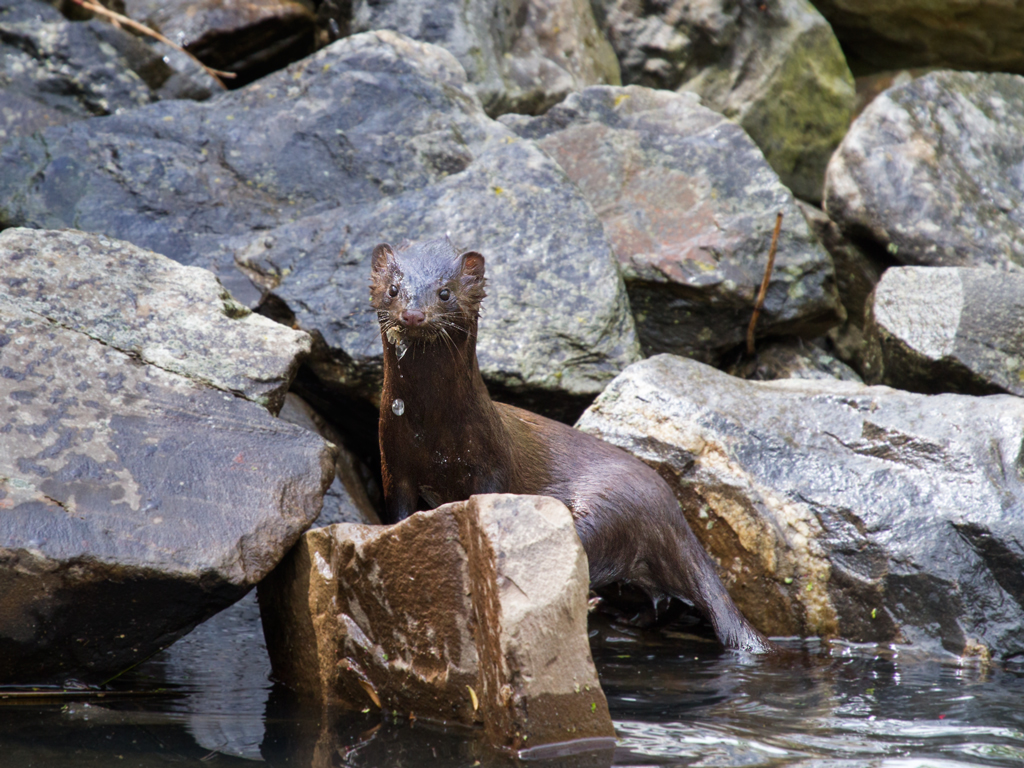
American mink emerges from a pond in Portland, Maine.

American mink territories are held by individual animals with minimal intrasex overlap, but with extensive overlap between animals of the opposite sex. Most territories are in undisturbed, rocky coastal habitats with broad littoral zones and dense cover. Some are on estuaries, rivers and canals near urban areas. Home ranges are typically 1–6 kilometres (0.62–3.73 miles) long, with male territories larger than females'. As long as it is close to water, the American mink is not fussy about its choice of den. Mink dens typically consist of long burrows in river banks, holes under logs, tree stumps, or roots and hollow trees, though dens located in rock crevices, drains, and nooks under stone piles and bridges are occasionally selected. The burrows they dig themselves are typically about four inches in diameter and may continue along for 10–12 feet (300–370 cm) at a depth of 2–3 feet (61–91 cm). The American mink may nest in burrows dug previously by muskrats, badgers and skunks, and may also dig dens in old ant hills. The nesting chamber is at the end of a four-inch tunnel, and is about a foot in diameter. It is warm, dry, and lined with straw and feathers. The American mink's dens are characterized by a large number of entrances and twisting passages. The number of exits varies from one to eight.

The American mink normally only vocalises during close encounters with other minks or predators. The sounds it emits include piercing shrieks and hisses when threatened and muffled chuckling sounds when mating. Kits squeak repeatedly when separated from their mothers. Ernest Thompson Seton reported hearing minks growl and snarl when confronting a threat. During aggressive interactions, mink assert their dominance by arching their backs, puffing up, lashing out their tails, and stomping and scraping the ground with their feet, while also opening their mouth in a threat-gape. Should this be unsuccessful, fights may result, with injuries to the head and neck.

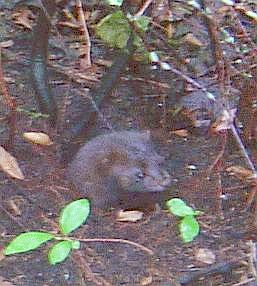
American mink in a burrow

=== Reproduction and development ===
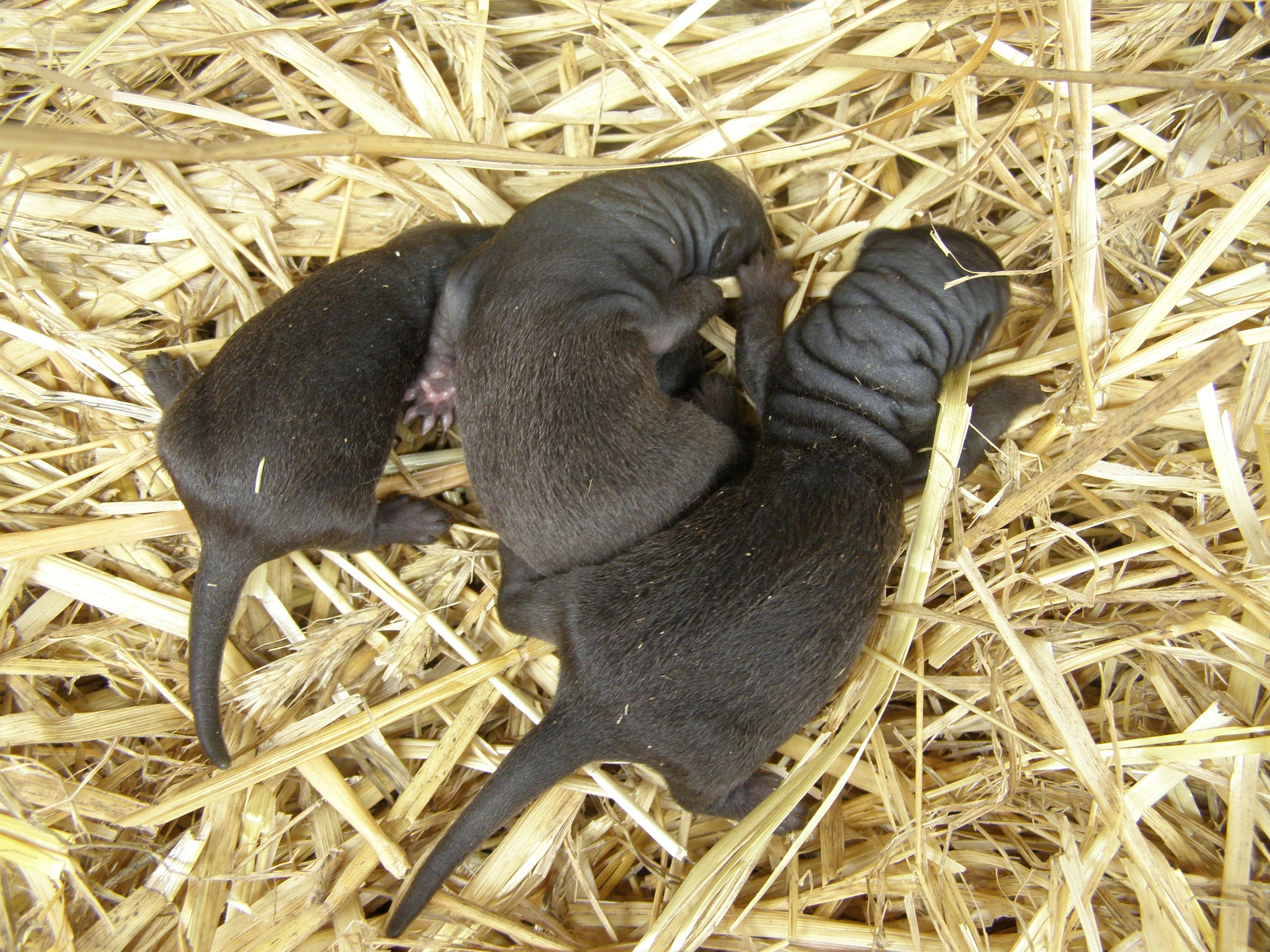
American mink kits in Poland

The American mink is a promiscuous animal that does not form pair bonds. The start of mating season ranges from February in its southern range to April in the north. In its introduced range, the American mink breeds one month earlier than the European mink. Males commonly fight during the mating season, which may result in the formation of loose, temporary dominance hierarchies governing access to receptive females. The mating season lasts for three weeks, with ovulation being induced by the presence of males. The mating process is violent, with the male typically biting the female on the nape of the neck and pinning her with his forefeet. Mating lasts from 10 minutes to four hours. Females are receptive for seven- to 10-day intervals during the three-week breeding season, and can mate with multiple males. Along with the striped skunk, the American mink is among the only mammals to mate in spring that have a short delay before implantation. This delayed implantation allows pregnant minks to keep track of environmental conditions and select an ideal time and place for parturition.

The gestation period lasts from 40 to 75 days, with actual embryonic development taking place for 30–32 days, indicating implantation delay can last from eight to 45 days. The young are born from April to June, in litters consisting of four kits on average. The litters are often multiply sired. Exceptionally large litters of 11 kits have been recorded in Tartaria and 16 in the United States. The kits are blind at birth, weighing six grams and possessing a short coat of fine, silver-white hairs. The kits are dependent on their mother's milk, which contains 3.8% lipids, 6.2% protein, 4.6% lactose and 10.66% mineral salts. Their eyes open after 25 days, with weaning occurring after five weeks. The kits begin hunting after 8 weeks of age, but stay close to their mother until autumn, when they become independent. Sexual maturity is attained during the kit's first spring, when they are about 10 months old.

=== Diet ===
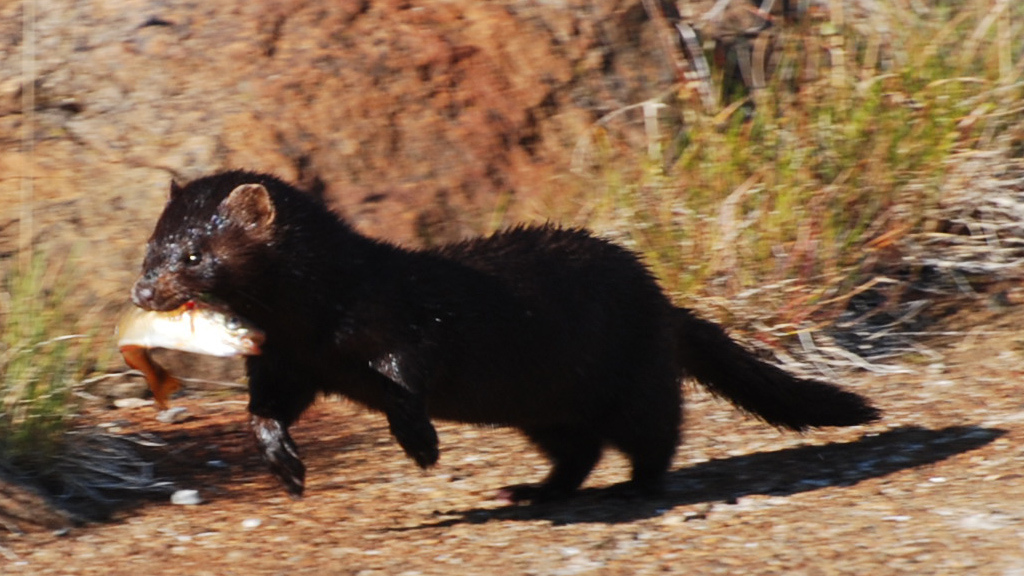
American mink with fish, at Litløy Lighthouse in Norway

The American mink is a carnivorous animal that feeds on rodents, fish, crustaceans, amphibians, and birds. It kills vertebrate prey by biting the back of the head or neck, leaving canine puncture marks 9–11 mm (0.35–0.43 in) apart. The American mink often kills birds, including larger species like seagulls and cormorants, by drowning. In its natural range, fish are its primary prey. Although inferior to the North American river otter in hunting fish, Audubon and Bachman once reported seeing a mink carrying a foot-long trout. Mink inhabiting the prairie sloughs primarily target frogs, tadpoles, and mice. It is a formidable predator of muskrats, which are chased underwater and killed in their own burrows. Among the rodents killed by the American mink in its native range are rats and mice of the genera Hesperomys, Microtus, Sigmodon, and Neotoma. Marsh rabbits are frequently taken in marshy or swampy tracts.

In Tartaria, the American mink's most important food items are voles, fish, crustaceans, frogs, and aquatic insects. In winter, aquatic foods predominate, while land-based prey increases in importance during the spring. Within the Altai Mountains, the American mink feeds predominantly on mammals such as rodents, shrews, and moles, as well as birds, reptiles, amphibians, and fish. Among the 11 different bird species preyed upon by minks in Altai are dippers and pine grosbeaks. Among fish, small species predominate in the diet of minks in Altai, and include minnows, gudgeons, and wide-headed sculpins. In the Sverdlovsk and Irkutsk Oblasts, mouse-like rodents are their most important foods, followed by birds, fish and insects. In the Russian Far East, where crustaceans are scarce, the American mink feeds extensively on amphipods. In the British Isles, dietary composition varies seasonally and regionally. European rabbits are the most commonly taken prey in areas where they are common, especially in summer. A range of small rodents and insectivores are preyed upon, but to a lesser degree. European hares are occasionally attacked. Minks in Britain prey on several bird species, with ducks, moorhens, and coots being most frequently targeted on lakes and rivers, while gulls are taken in coastal habitats. Marine species preyed upon in Britain include European eels, rock-pool fish such as blenny, shore crabs and crayfish. American minks have been implicated in the decline of the water vole in the United Kingdom and linked to the decline of waterfowl across their range in Europe. They are now considered vermin in much of Europe and are hunted for the purpose of wildlife management. In South America's Cape Horn Biosphere Reserve, mammals, including both native and exotic rodents, are the American mink's main prey throughout the year, though birds are of equal importance during their summer nesting periods.

The American mink may pose a threat to poultry. According to Clinton Hart Merriam and Ernest Thompson Seton, although the American mink is a potential poultry thief, it is overall less damaging than the stoat. Unlike the stoat, which often engages in surplus killing, the mink usually limits itself to killing and eating one fowl during each attack. Studies in Britain indicate poultry and game birds only constitute 1% of the animals' overall diets; small mammals, especially rabbits, tend to dominate, followed by fish and birds, especially moorhens and coots.

=== Relationships with other predators ===
The American mink replaces and sometimes kills the European mink wherever their ranges overlap. The decline of European mink populations seems to coincide with the spread of the American mink, but "The early declines in Central Europe and later in Finland took place before the spread of the American mink." The diets of the American mink and European otter overlap to a great extent. In areas where these two species are sympatric, competition with the otter for fish causes the American mink to hunt land-based prey more frequently.

Large birds of prey, such as bald eagles (Haliaeetus leucocephalus) and great horned owls (Bubo virginianus) occasionally hunt American mink. In Finland, white-tailed eagles (Haliaeetus albicilla) have become the main natural control and may inhibit the mink from breeding via heavy predation. Eurasian eagle-owls (Bubo bubo) also can be predators of mink in the introduced regions.

In Florida (specifically southern Florida), American minks may be eaten by some growth stage of invasive snakes such as Burmese pythons, reticulated pythons, Southern African rock pythons, Central African rock pythons, boa constrictors, yellow anacondas, Bolivian anacondas, dark-spotted anacondas, and green anacondas.

== Intelligence ==
An early behavioral study was performed in the 1960s to assess visual learning ability in minks, ferrets, skunks, and house cats. Animals were tested on their ability to recognize objects, learn their valences and make object selections from memory. Minks were found to outperform ferrets, skunks, and cats in this task, but this letter (short paper) fails to account for a possible conflation of a cognitive ability (decision making, associative learning) with a largely perceptual ability (invariant object recognition).

== Range ==
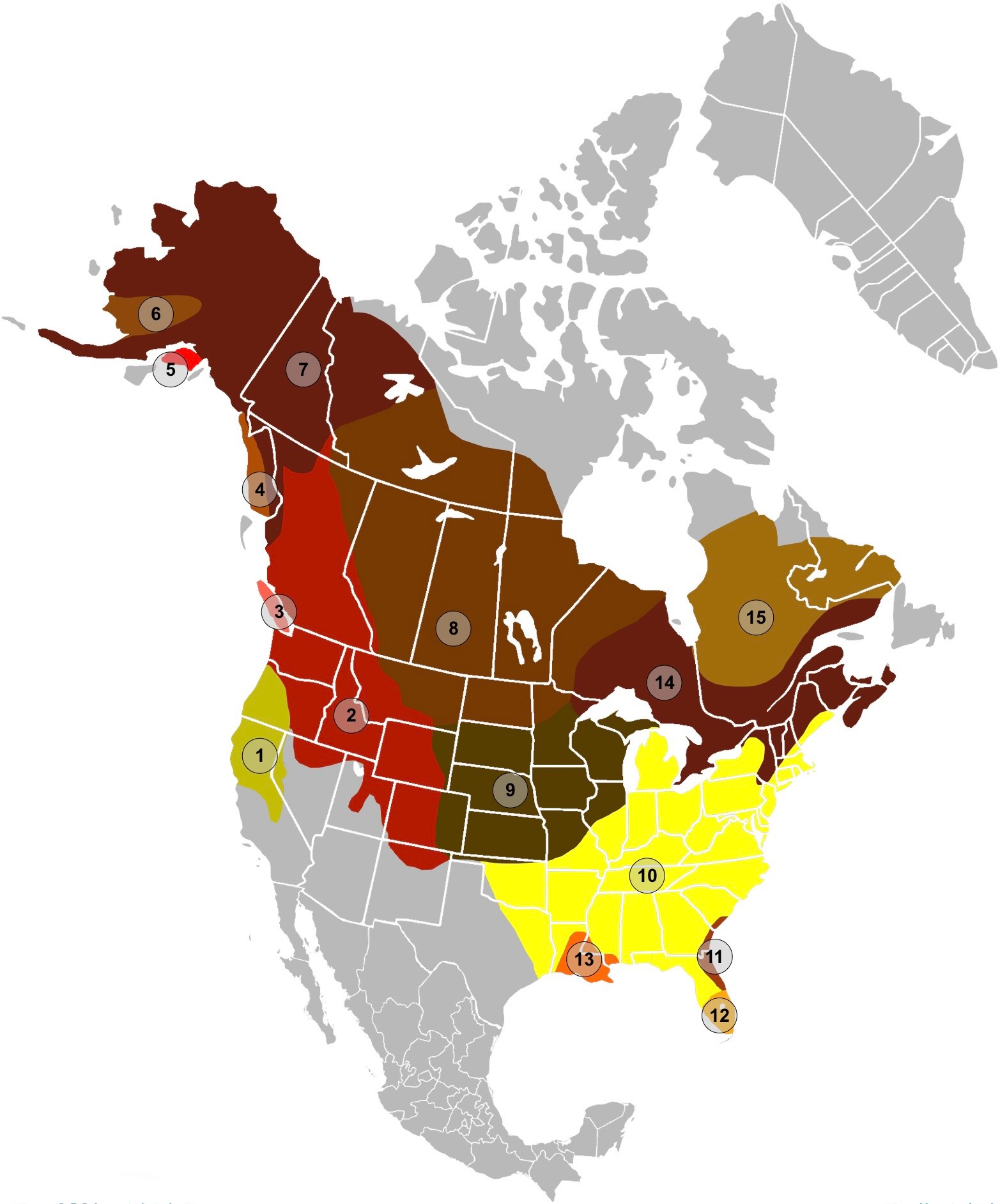
Distribution of the 15 mink subspecies: (1) California lowland mink, (2) western mink, (3) Vancouver Island mink, (4) island mink, (5) Kenai mink, (6) Aniak mink, (7) Alaskan mink, (8) Hudson Bay mink, (9) Mississippi Valley mink, (10) common mink, (11) Florida mink, (12) Everglades mink, (13) Louisiana mink, (14) eastern mink, (15) East Canadian mink

=== Natural ===
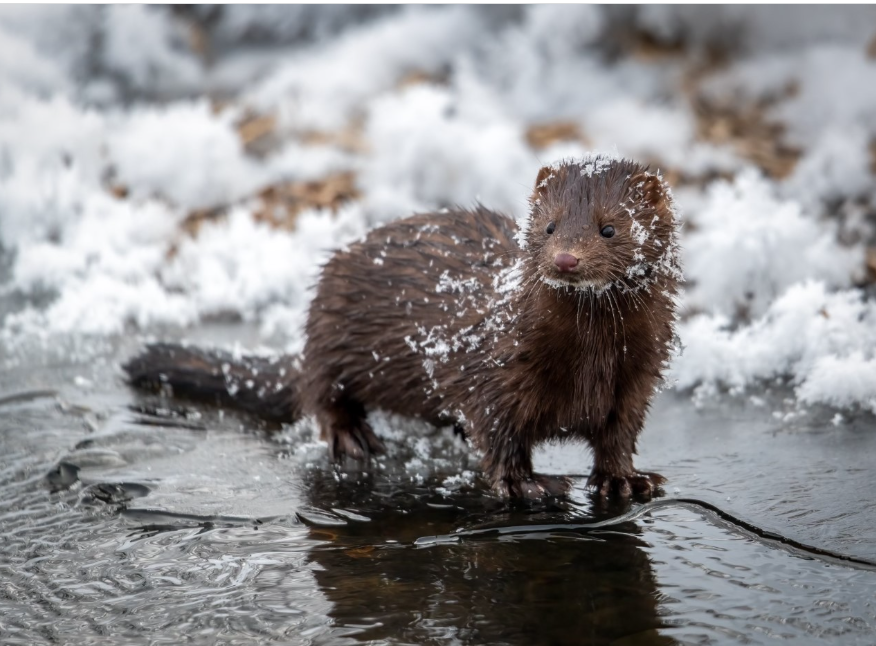
Kenai National Wildlife Refuge, Alaska.

The species' natural range encompasses most of North America, from Alaska, through Canada and further into the United States except Arizona and the more arid areas of California, Nevada, Utah, New Mexico, and West Texas.

=== Introduced ===
Introductory video about the American mink invasion on the island of Navarino, Chile.

==== Argentina ====
The American mink was deliberately introduced for commercial fur production in several provinces of Patagonia in 1930. The animals escaped or were released from farms in Chubut Province and now occur in the Chubut and Río Negro Provinces and Tierra del Fuego. In Argentina the mink is one of the major menaces of the Hooded grebe, which risks becoming extinct.

==== South Chile ====
In Chile, American minks were introduced to Magallanes Region in the 1930s. Ever since minks were freed into nature during the crisis of the fur industry the mink has expanded its range across Chile. Actually it ranges from Araucanía Region in the north to Magallanes Region in the south. However, there are isolated territories in between where the mink is not found, probably due to biogeographic barriers. One of the latest areas where the mink has been found is Chiloé Archipelago,- minks were reported there for the first time 2013, making scientists suspect they may have arrived on a ship.

==== Western Europe ====
Feral American minks in Europe are thought to be of domesticated stock derived from the N. v. vison, N. v. melampeplus and N. v. ingens subspecies. The first specimens were imported to Europe in 1920 for fur-farming purposes. The American mink was introduced in Italy in the 1950s, and currently resides mostly in the northeastern part of the Italian Peninsula. The majority of these populations do not appear to be self-sufficient, though minks in the Monti Prenestini and Simbruini in Lazio have reproduced successfully.

Escapees of fur farms established a self-sustaining and expanding population on the Iberian Peninsula by the second half of the 20th century. In 2013, the Spanish government announced a plan to eradicate the species, as a means to protect the falling populations of European mink and other endangered species affected such as the Pyrenean desman.

The first mink farm in Norway was built in 1927, with escapees establishing wild populations within 30 years of its establishment. The first feral mink populations arose in 1930, establishing territories in southwestern Norway. These feral minks, augmented by further escapees, formed the basis of a strong population in Hordaland by the end of World War II. Feral mink colonised eastern Norway in 1930 and had become established in most southeastern counties in the early 1940s. By 1950, feral mink reached central Norway, with further populations occurring in the northern counties of Nordland and Troms. During the post-World War II period until 1965, mink had colonised most of the country. In modern times, the American mink occupies all of the Norwegian mainland, but is absent on some islands.

The American mink was first imported to Great Britain in 1929, though a series of escapes and releases led to the establishment of a self-sufficient feral population in Devon by the late 1950s, and others by the early 1960s. In Ireland, the American mink was not farmed until the early 1950s, thus feral populations established themselves there much later. The species is now widespread in mainland Great Britain and Ireland, though some places remain uncolonised. It has established itself on a few islands, including Arran and Lewis and Harris. Until 2005, mink hunting with packs of hounds occurred in the UK. The total mink population in Great Britain is estimated at 110,000 (England: 46,750; Scotland: 52,250; Wales: 9,750). This population may be declining as European otter numbers increase. There are no estimates for the mink population in Ireland, but it is thought to be low, because of Ireland's strong otter population.

==== Former USSR ====
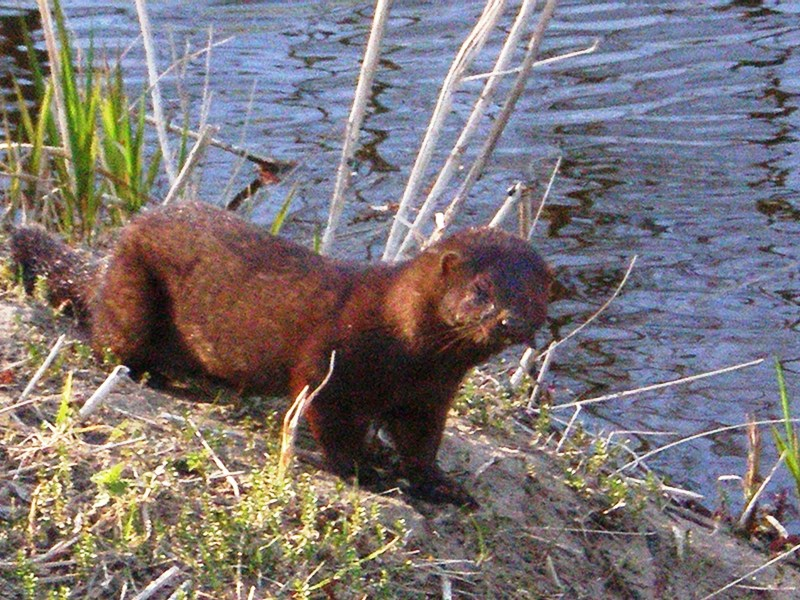
An American mink in Lithuania's Kėdainiai district

In 1933, American minks were released into the Voronezh Oblast in European Russia. Until 1963, more minks were introduced in various quantities in the Voronezh and Arkhangelsk Oblasts, Karelia, in Kalininsk, Gorkovsk, Volgograd and Chelyabinsk Oblasts, and into Tatarstan and Bashkir, as well as the Lithuanian and Byelorussian SSRs. Beyond the Urals, American minks were introduced in the Sverdlovsk, Tyumen, Omsk, Kemerovo, Novosibirsk, Chita and Irkutsk Oblasts, in the Altai and Krasnoyarsk Krai, in the Tuvan, Buryat and Yakut Autonomous Soviet Socialist Republics, into the Magadan, Kamchatka and Amur Oblasts, into the Khabarovsk and Primorsky Krai, into the Chukotka Autonomous Okrug and several other locations, including Sakhalin and Urup Island. In the Caucasus region, American minks were released into North Ossetia. In Central Asia they were released in the Tien Shan region. Originally, captive-bred minks were used, but wild specimens were later released to facilitate the species' acclimatisation within Soviet territories. Several years after the first release, introductions into the ranges already held by native European minks were discontinued, with most releases from then on taking place in Siberia and the Far East. Although considerable areas were occupied by the American mink by the early 1960s, the species' Soviet range was never continuous, as most released populations were isolated from one another.

==== Iceland ====
The species has been present in Iceland since the 1930s, and has become well established, despite it being heavily hunted since 1939. However, its population underwent a 42% decline during the years 2002–2006, which coincided with a decline in sand eel populations resulting in a drop in the seabird populations on which the minks feed.

==== Asia ====
American mink is considered as one of the most widespread invasive species in China, especially in Northeastern area. Minks are introduced in some prefectures Japan as well, especially being problematic in Hokkaido, and regulated by law.

== Diseases and parasites ==
The American mink often carries light tick and flea infestations. Tick species known to infest minks include Ixodes hexagonus, Ixodes canisuga, Ixodes ricinus, and Ixodes acuminatus. Flea species known to infest minks include Palaeopsylla minor, Malaraeus penicilliger, Ctenopthalmus noblis, Megabothris walkeri, Typhloceras poppei, and Nosopsyllus fasciatus. Endoparasites include Skrjabingylus nasicola and Troglotrema acutum. Trematode Metorchis conjunctus can also infect American minks.

Transmissible mink encephalopathy (TME) is a prion disease of mink, similar to BSE in cattle and scrapie in sheep. A 1985 outbreak of TME in Stetsonville, Wisconsin resulted in a 60% mortality rate for the minks. Further testing revealed this agent is transmissible between mink, cattle, and sheep. The Stetsonville outbreak may have been due to the mink being fed carcasses or otherwise consuming other infected animals.

Toxoplasma gondii has been recorded in American minks in southern Chile, with 59% seroprevalence in the 73 mink analyzed in one study. Southern river otters of the area were also found to have high T. gondii seroprevalence in this study, showing a high exposure of semiaquatic mustelids to the parasite in this part of Chile.

== Decline of wild mink ==
Because of numerous incidents of domestic mink escaping from fur farms and establishing themselves in the wild, concern has arisen among conservationists of the possible repercussions such escapes may have on natural wild mink populations. Domestic mink are larger than wild mink, which may cause problems with the ecosystem when they escape. Minks are solitary, territorial animals and are intolerant of other minks. In times of overpopulation, they control their own numbers by either killing each other through direct conflict or by causing weaker minks to be driven from territory until starvation sets in. When hundreds or thousands of released domestic minks flood an ecosystem, it causes a great disturbance for the wild minks, resulting in the deaths of the majority of the released mink and many of the wild ones from starvation or injuries incurred while fighting over territory. When a domestic mink survives long enough to reproduce, it may cause problems for the wild mink populations. The adding of weaker domestic mink genes into wild mink populations is believed by some to have contributed to the decline of mink populations in Canada.

A 2006 study in Denmark concluded, due to frequent escapes from existing mink farms, "Closing mink farms may result in a crash of the free-ranging population, or alternatively it may result in the establishment of a better-adapted, truly feral population that may ultimately outnumber the population that was present before farm closures." The study reported more information would be necessary to determine the outcome. Another Danish study reported a significant majority of the "wild" mink were mink which had escaped from fur farms. About 47% had escaped within two months, 31% had escaped prior to two months, and 21% "may or may not have been born in nature." The survival rate for recently released minks is reportedly lower than for wild minks, but if feral minks survive at least two months, their survival rate is the same as for wild minks. The authors suggest this is due to the rapid behavioural adaptation of the animals.

== Relationships with humans ==
=== Disease ===
The American mink and European mink have both been found to transmit SARS-CoV-2, the virus that causes COVID-19.

Since the 1980s, Rocky Mountain Laboratories has used American mink for disease models. Mink are not found in China but are a SARS-CoV-2 transmission model.

=== Fur use ===
American minks are primarily used in manufacturing fur coats, jackets, and capes. Pelts that are not able to be converted into these items are made into trimming for cloth and fur coats. Mink scarves and stoles are also manufactured. Jackets and capes are mostly made from small to medium-sized specimens, usually females and young males, while trimming, scarves and stoles are made from adult males. The most valuable peltries come from eastern Canada which, although the smallest, are the silkiest and darkest.

==== Trapping ====
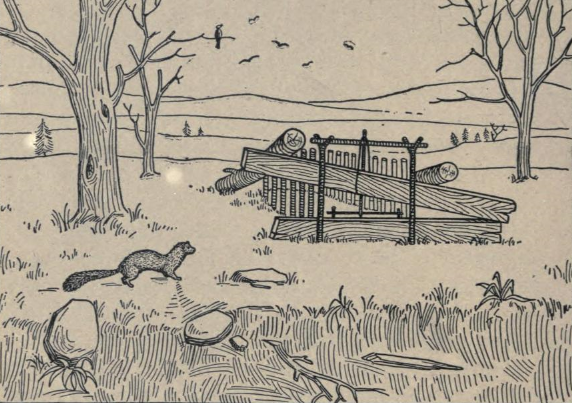
Illustration of an American mink approaching a board or log trap

Although difficult to catch, the American mink, prior to being commercially farmed, was among the most frequently trapped furbearers as, unlike other furbearing mammals, it did not hibernate in winter, and could thus be caught on a nightly basis even in the far north. Minks were legally trapped from early November to early April, when their pelts were prime. Minks caught in traps cling to life with great tenacity, having been known to break their teeth in trying to extricate themselves from steel traps. Elliott Coues described a trapped mink thusly:

One who has not taken a Mink in a steel trap can scarcely form an idea of the terrible expression the animal's face assumes as the captor approaches. It has always struck me as the most nearly diabolical of anything in animal physiognomy. A sullen stare from the crouched, motionless form gives way to a new look of surprise and fear, accompanied with the most violent contortions of the body, with renewed champing of the iron till breathless, with heaving flanks, and open mouth dribbling saliva, the animal settles again, and watches with a look of concentrated hatred, mingled with impotent rage and frightful despair. The countenance of the Mink, its broad, low head, short ears, small eyes, piggish snout, and formidable teeth, is always expressive of the lower and more brutal passions, all of which are intensified at such times. As may well be supposed, the creature must not be incautiously dealt with when in such a frame of mind.

One Native American method involved using a bait (usually a slit open chicken carcass filled with fish oil and oysters) tied to a rope and dragged around an area laden with traps. A mink would thus follow the trail into one of the traps. Another indigenous method involved placing traps scented with muskrat and female mink musk on top of disused muskrat dens by water bodies. Attracted by the scent of food and a female, the mink would get caught in the trap and drown. On the American prairies, only the steel trap was used, due to the lack of timber.

==== Farming ====
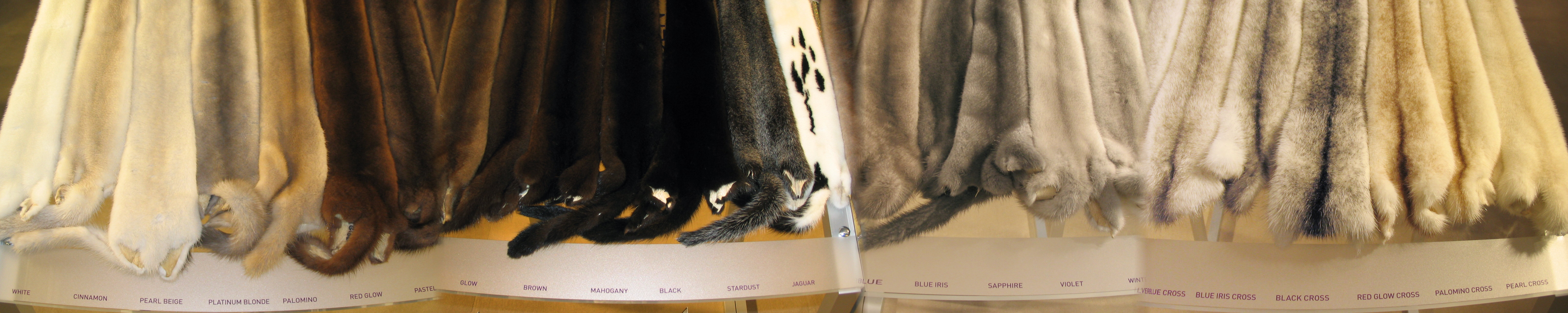
Various American mink colour mutations

Breeding American minks for their fur began in the late 19th century, as increasing enthusiasm for mink pelts made the harvesting of wild minks insufficient to meet the new demands. American minks are easily kept in captivity, and breed readily. In 2005, the US ranked fourth in production behind Denmark, China and the Netherlands. Minks typically breed in March, and give birth to their litters in May. Farmers vaccinate the young kits for botulism, distemper, enteritis, and, if needed, pneumonia. They are harvested in late November and December. Methods for killing animals on fur farms, as on all farms, are detailed in the American Veterinary Medical Association's Report on Euthanasia which is used as a voluntary guideline for state departments of agriculture which have jurisdiction over all farms raising domesticated livestock, including minks. In the past, some mink farms successfully provided pools of water for the mink to swim; however, this practice is unheard-of in modern mink production. Minks are motivated to access swimming water, and the absence of water is a source of frustration on modern farms. The ideal diet for farm-bred minks consists of four to five ounces of horse meat and a quarter-pint of milk once daily.

==== Colour mutations ====
Selective breeding has produced a number of different colour shades in mink peltries, ranging from pure white, through beiges, browns, and greys, to a brown that is almost black. The two standard strains are brown and "black cross" which, when paired, produce numerous colour variations. When an albino mink is born, it is standard procedure in fur farms to breed it to other colour mutations to produce grey and light-brown pastel shades. The following graph is a simplification of the main colour strains:

Colour variant	Image	Description
Pastel		Pale brown and beige fur with darker guard hairs of various hues
Royal pastel		Same as above, but with a bluish cast
Silverblu		Bluish grey fur fibre and guard hairs which are sometimes white-tipped, giving a silvery blue tone, pelts of this type with a brownish cast are less valuable.
Breath of spring		Also known as "platinum", this variety has a brighter bluish cast than the Silverblu type.
Blufrost		Pale brown fur fibre interspersed with dark brown guard hair, sprinkled with white guard hairs
Kohinur		Also known as "black cross", this variety has white or cream-coloured fur fibre with a sprinkling of blackish guard hairs throughout the body, with the greatest concentrations being on the back and shoulders.
Cerulean		Also known as "sapphire", this variety has bluish-grey fur fibre with mauve, blue-grey guard hair, with the greatest depth of colour being on the back.
Steel blue		Dull battleship grey guard hair, with lighter shaded fur fibre
Lutetia		Also known as "Aleutian", this variety has gun-metal grey fur fibre and guard hair.

=== As pets ===
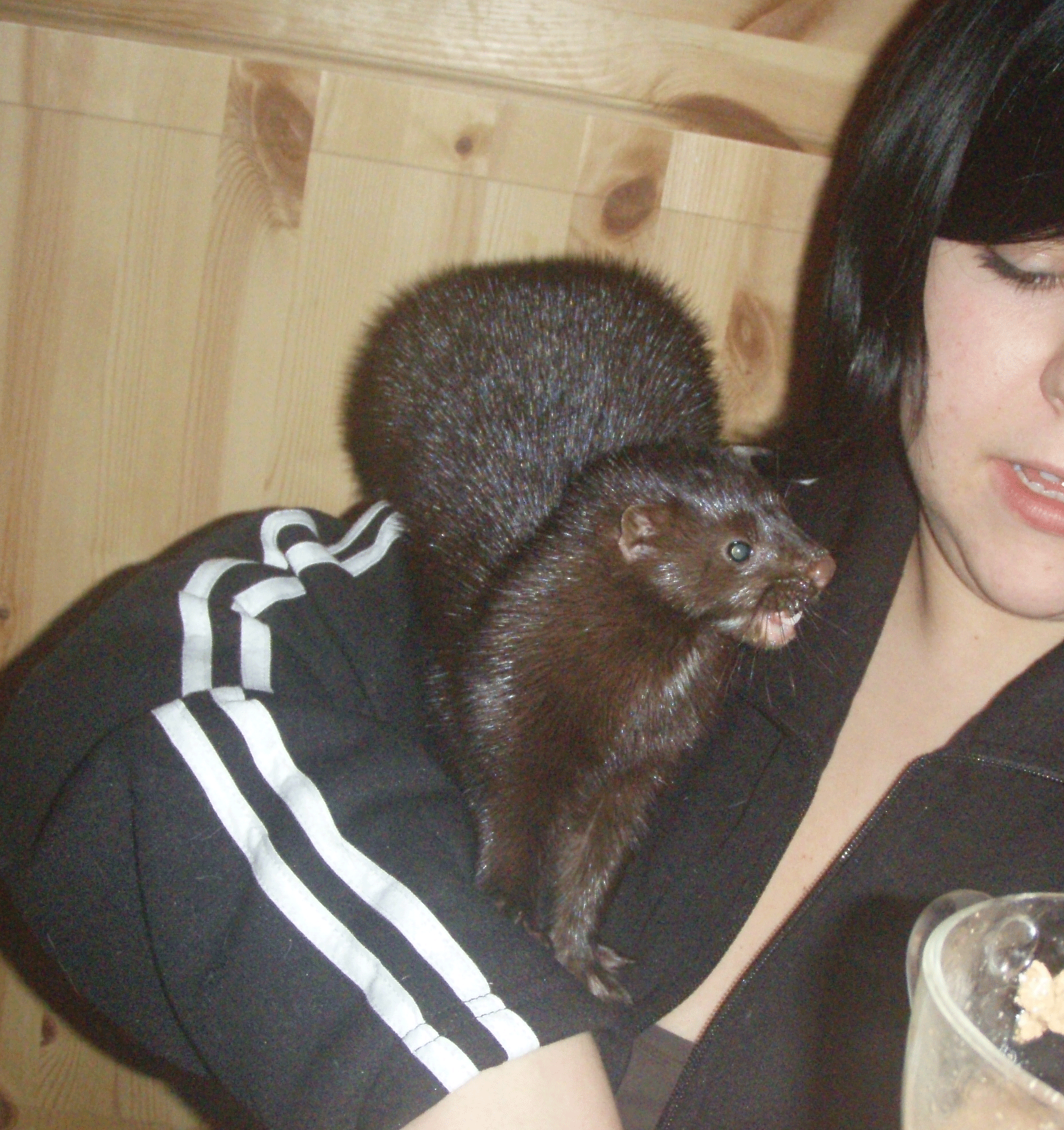
Mink as pet

Wild mink can be tamed if caught young, but can be difficult to handle and are usually not handled bare-handed. In the late 19th century, tame American minks were often reared for ratting, much as ferrets were used in Europe. Some modern ratters have revived this practice using farm-raised mink, sometimes alongside ratting dogs. They are sometimes more effective ratters than terriers, as they can enter rat holes and drive rats from their hiding places.

When mink of wild stock are confined with tame ones, the wild invariably dominate the tamed mink. They have also been known to dominate cats in confrontations. Although intelligent, minks are not quick to learn tricks taught to them by their owners. Because of their fondness for bathing, captive American minks may enter kettles or other open water-containing vessels.

Although domestic minks have been bred in captivity for almost a century, they have not been bred to be tame. Domestic minks have been bred for size, fur quality, and color. However, the U.S. Fur Commission claims "mink are truly domesticated animals", based on the number of years they have been kept on fur farms.

=== Literature ===
As an invasive species in the United Kingdom, minks have been the subject of at least two novels. Ewan Clarkson's 1968 Break for Freedom (published as Syla, the Mink in the US) tells the story of a female mink escaped from a fur farm in a realistic style. On the other hand, A.R. Lloyd's 1982 Kine is a heroic fantasy with the minks as villains and the weasels and other indigenous animals as heroes.

== Indigenous names ==
- Abenaki language
  - Western Abnaki: mosbas
  - Penobscot: mósəpehso
- Alabama: sakihpa
- Aleut: ilgitux̂
- Arapaho: no'eihi'
- Arikara: eérux
- Assiniboine: íkusana
- Blackfoot: aapssiiyai'kayi or soyii'kayi
- Cayuga: jǫ́ˀdagaˀ
- Cherokee: svki
- Chickasaw: okfincha
- Comox: qayχ
- Cree: sâkwes
  - Plains Cree: sâkwês ᓵᑫᐧᐢ
  - Swampy Cree: šâkwêšiw ᔖᑴᔑᐤ
  - Moose Cree: shakweshiw ᔕᑴᔑᐤ
  - Naskapi: achikaas ᐊᒋᑲᔅ
  - Innu: atshakash
  - James Bay Cree: achikaash ᐊᒋᑳᔥ
- Crow: baapúxtakbialee
- Dakelh
  - Nadleh Whut'en: telhjoos
  - Nak'azdli: techus
- Dane-zaa: taadle
- Dënesųłinë́: tthełjus
- Gitxsan: lis'in
- Halkomelem
  - Hul'q'umi'num: chuchi'q'un'
  - Halqeméylem: ts'qáyex̱iya
- Heiltsuk–Oowekyala: kvənn̓à
  - Haíɫzaqv: kvṇ̓á
- Hidatsa: nagcúa
- Ho-Chunk: jająksík
- Kaska: tets'ūtl'ęhį̄
- Koasati: sa•kih•pa
- Ktunaxa: ʔinuya
- Kwak̓wala: ma̱tsa
- Lakota: ikhúsą
- Lenape
  - Munsee: wiiníingwus
  - Unami: wininkwës
- Lillooet: t̓sexyátsen
- Lushootseed
  - Northern Lushootseed: bəščəb
  - Southern Lushootseed: c̓əbal̕qid
- Menominee: sāhkih
- Miami-Illinois: šinkohsa
- Mi'kmaq: mujpej
- Mohawk: aió:hah
- Nisga'a: lisy̓een
- Nishnaabemwin: zhaangwesh
- Nlaka'pamuctsin: c̓əx̣lécn
- Nuxalk: t'uka
- Nuu-chah-nulth
  - Ehattesaht: č̕aastumc
  - Tseshaht: č̓aastimc
- Ojibwe: zhaangweshi
- Okanagan: c̓x̌licn
- Omaha–Ponca: íki skă
- Oneida: shotsya·káweˀ
- Onondaga: jyojá·ga·k
- Potawatomi: wnepshkwé
- Salish: c̓xlicn̓
- Senćoŧen: ćećiḵen
- Shashishalhem: ḵáyx̱
- Seneca: jío’da:ga’
- Secwepemc: ts'exlétsen
- Sm'álgyax: lis'yaan
- Tuscarora: θenę́·ku·t
- Tse'khene: tantl'ehe
- Umatilla: kuucpúu
- Witsuwitʼen: tëc'ohts'iy
- Wolastoqey-Passamaquoddy: ciyahkehs

== See also ==
- Aleutian disease
- European mink
- Sea mink
- Fur farming

== Sources ==
- Anthony, Harold Elmer (1928). "Field Book of North American Mammals". Nature. 124 (3135): 836. Bibcode:1929Natur.124S.836.. doi:10.1038/124836c0. hdl:2027/mdp.39015020808831. "Descriptions of every mammal known north of the Rio Grande, together with brief accounts of habits, geographical ranges, etc."
- Bachrach, Max (1953). Fur: A practical treatise (3rd ed.). New York, NY: Prentice-Hall.
- Coues, Elliott (1877). Fur-Bearing Animals: A monograph of North American mustelidae (Report). Washington, DC: Government Printing Office.
- Feldhamer, George A.; Thompson, Bruce Carlyle; Chapman, Joseph A. (2003). Wild Mammals of North America: Biology, management, and conservation. JHU Press. ISBN 978-0-8018-7416-1.
- Gates, William Gilford (1915). The Propagation of Mink and Marten. Spokane, Shaw, & Borden Co.
- Harding, Arthur Robert (1906). Mink Trapping. Columbus, OH: A.R. Harding (self published). "A book of instruction giving many methods of trapping"
- Merriam, C. Hart (1886). The Mammals of the Adirondack Region, Northeastern New York. New York, NY: Holt. "With an introductory chapter treating of the location and boundaries of the region, its geological history, topography, climate, general features, botany and faunal position"
- Harris, Stephen; Yalden, Derek (2008). Mammals of the British Isles (4th, revised ed.). Mammal Society. ISBN 978-0-906282-65-6.
- Heptner, V.G.; Sludskii, A.A. (2002). Mammals of the Soviet Union. Vol. II, part 1b, Carnivores (Mustelidae and Procyonidae). Washington, DC: Smithsonian Institution Libraries and National Science Foundation. ISBN 978-90-04-08876-4.
- Kurtén, Björn (1980). Pleistocene Mammals of North America. New York, NY: Columbia University Press. ISBN 978-0-231-03733-4.
- Seton, Ernest Thompson (1909). Life-Histories of Northern Animals: An account of the mammals of Manitoba. New York, NY: Scribner.
- Stone, Witmer; Cram, William Everett (1902). "American animals". Nature. 124 (3135): 836. Bibcode:1929Natur.124S.836.. doi:10.1038/124836c0. hdl:2027/mdp.39015020808831.
