= Women Against Feminism =

Informal antifeminist movement

Women Against Feminism is an anti-feminist online movement using the hashtag #WomenAgainstFeminism. Beginning in the summer of 2014, the movement gained extensive media coverage in the United States and United Kingdom.

== Origin and content ==
The Women Against Feminism campaign began on Tumblr in July 2013, presumably in response to the "Who Needs Feminism" campaign. Users of the hashtag #WomenAgainstFeminism believe that feminism is misandrist (man-hating); they deny that sexism exists and that women are oppressed by men. The Tumblr blog "Women Against Feminism" depicts women displaying handwritten anti-feminist messages; the main themes are that feminism is a form of surveillance, that feminism is anti-male, and that feminism harms women's individual ability to speak and act for themselves. Posts often begin with the statement, "I don't need feminism because", followed by their reason(s). Paula McDonald and Diane White argue that such messages stem from neoliberal attitudes that lead women to believe that they are at a disadvantage due to personal issues rather than societal problems.

According to the BBC, the movement is an online community that use social media to brand feminism as a "toxic" movement. Following on the original creator of the "Women Against Feminism" Tumblr page is an American woman who has chosen to remain anonymous because of online harassment and backlash she has faced for her ideas. Furthermore according to The Daily Dot, the campaign gathered steam in July and August 2014, when several prominent columnists and bloggers brought media attention to it.

A quantitative content analysis by political scientist Oana Crusmac found that women contributing to the "Women Against Feminism" blog typically believe that feminists hate men, that feminism destroys traditional gender roles and thus undermines traditional family structures, that feminists want special privileges for women, and that feminism encourages a lack of personal accountability. traditional gender roles are destroyed and it doesn't consider the "traditional family," feminism does not mean equality, and that women need others to solve their own problems.

== Reception ==
As of 19 August 2014, the campaign's Facebook page had garnered 21,000 likes.

In an op-ed for The Globe and Mail, journalist Margaret Wente writes that she supports Women Against Feminism, saying she believes modern feminism has become a belief system that presents a distorted view of reality based on misandry and victim-culture, and that she questions the existence of rape culture.

A commentator for Time magazine writes: "Most of the posts include some reiteration of the central misunderstanding about feminism, that a core belief of feminism involves hating men." A commentator for The Irish Independent says that "being anti-feminism is like being pro-apartheid, or a big fan of social injustice, but no one would think it's cute to hold up a sign saying that". Independent researcher Mackenzie Cockerill states that "[a] global culture of misogyny is growing and flourishing thanks to the internet and its unprecedented potential for connecting people and their ideas."

Commenting on the campaign, Anette Borchorst, professor and researcher in sex and gender in the Department of Political Science, Aalborg University, stated that "there have always been disagreements and debates within feminism and those debates help to advance the movement." She added that, "Feminism has always generated debate among women and it is difficult to imagine a feminist world-view that everyone can agree on."

Beulah Maud Devaney's September 2015 column on openDemocracy compares Women Against Feminism to the history of women's opposition to feminism dating back to the late 1700s, suggesting that a modern anti-feminist campaign will be just as ineffective in combating the feminist movement as preceding efforts. Devaney asserts that Women Against Feminism mainly represents the view of privileged women who want to maintain the status quo and are, thus, deliberately misrepresenting what feminism stands for. According to Devaney, "As intersectional feminism becomes more popular it is, sadly, to be expected that some white, straight, cis first world women will see the emphasis on their own privilege as an attack. In a similar way feminist calls for a more inclusive beauty standard and appreciation of multiple body types can be read as an attempt to undermine the received wisdom that 'skinny white girl' is the ideal aesthetic." Devaney adds that Women Against Feminism has failed to stem public support for the feminist agenda, that its influence is minor, and that its arguments are "easy to dismiss." Devaney concludes, however, that the anti-feminism it represents deserves closer examination.

In October 2015, Angela Epstein mentioned the blog in an editorial criticizing feminists for being unpleasant to women who disagree with them. Epstein argues that feminists have lost their cause and are fighting unnecessary battles and overplaying issues such as women's "self-imposed glass ceiling". Recounting her experience of receiving insulting messages after sharing her stance on modern feminism with BBC News, she states, "I don't expect all women to agree with me. But there are many who do. Look no further than the proliferation of websites such as Women Against Feminism."

Crusmac argues that social representation of feminism within WAF is not based on lack of information, but rather on a stereotypical understanding of the concept. Crusmac's work also argues that "WAF contributors do not quality as post-feminists" as "While post-feminists can be easily identified and characterised by the already famous expression 'I am not a feminist, but ...', WAF contributors categorically reject any feminist resemblance and instead prefer either to be labelled as 'humanist' or 'egalitarian', either [sic] to be strong supporters of the traditional gender roles." Crusmac's research also reveals that social representation of feminism in the on-line group WAF has "numerous common elements with the way the second wave was stereotyped by the 80s media backlash against feminism, such as: feminism is an ideology that demonizes men and does not wish equality (which is a goal already accomplished), but special treatment and privileges for women, thereby ignoring the individual contribution in shaping success or decision making. Moreover, in the same direction in common with the negative illustration of the 80s, feminism is seen as a threat to family and womanhood, and as a promoter of promiscuity."

== See also ==
- Hashtag activism – Use of hashtags for internet activism
- NotAllMen – Hashtag and popular Internet meme
- Men's rights movement – Social advocacy movement
- Straw feminism – Distortion or fabrication of feminist arguments
