= YesAllWomen =

Online feminist movement

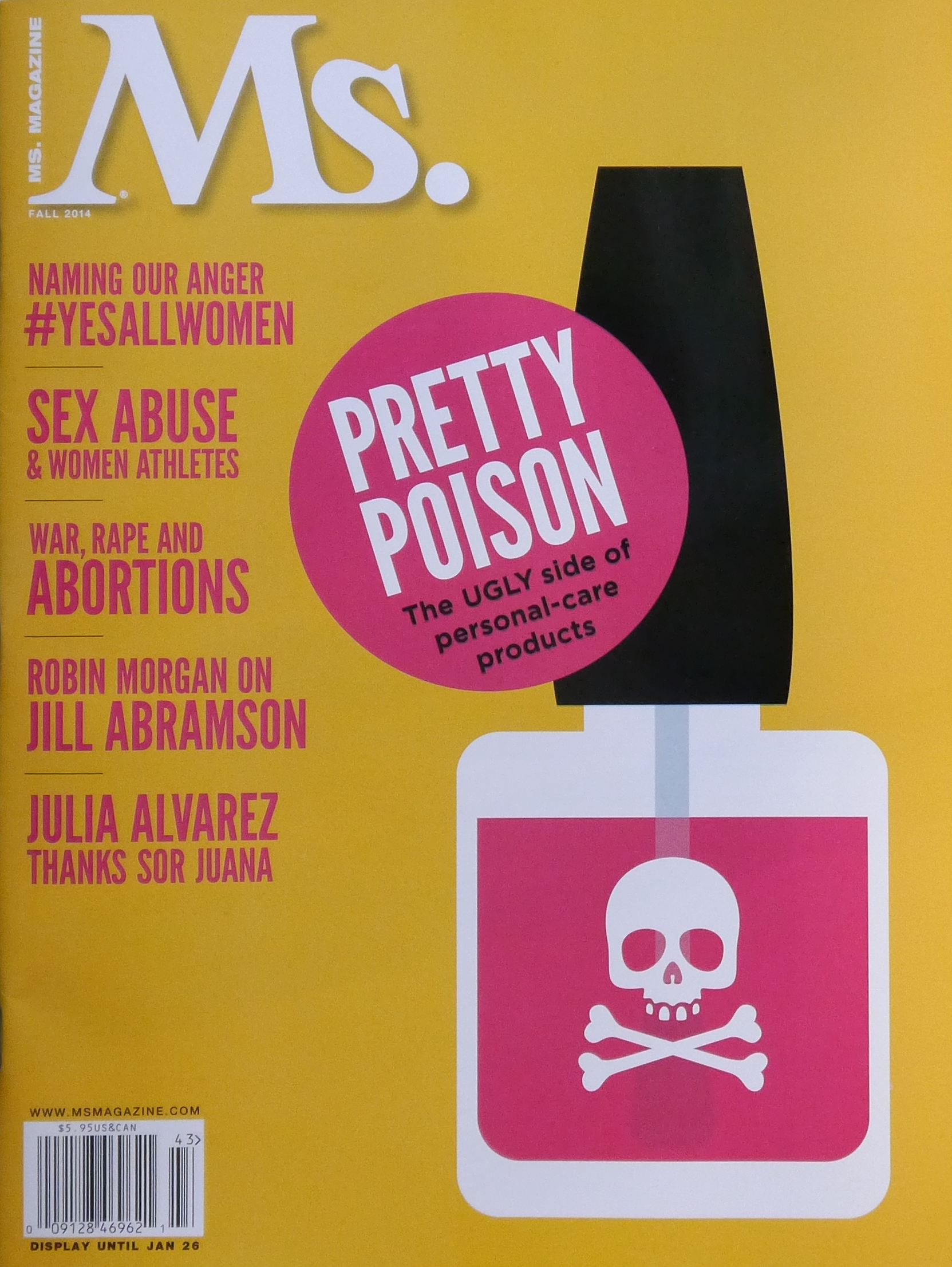
#YesAllWomen featured on the cover of the fall 2014 issue of Ms. magazine

#YesAllWomen is a Twitter hashtag and social media campaign in which users share examples or stories of misogyny and violence against women. First used in online conversations about misogyny following the 2014 Isla Vista killings, the hashtag was popular in May 2014, and was created partly in response to the Twitter hashtag #NotAllMen. #YesAllWomen reflected a grassroots campaign in which women shared their personal stories about harassment and discrimination. The campaign attempted to raise awareness of sexism that women experience, often from people they know.

== Origin ==
Following a killing spree in Isla Vista, California that left six people dead and fourteen others wounded, the killer's Internet activity was described as misogynistic, and hatred of women was cited as a factor in his crimes. In the wake of the killings, some Twitter users made the argument that "not all men" are like this, or would commit such crimes. Others responded by satirizing those arguments and deeming them defensive and an attempt to deflect from uncomfortable topics such as violence against women and sexism.

In reaction to the hashtag "#NotAllMen," an anonymous Twitter user then created "#YesAllWomen" to express that all women are affected by sexism and misogyny, even though not all men are sexist. Some sources have reported that the hashtag creator appears to be twitter user @gildedspine, which was confirmed when The Toast published a reflection piece by her on the hashtag's anniversary in 2015. The hashtag quickly became used by women throughout social media to share their experiences of sexism and harassment. Some tweets included "'I have a boyfriend' is the easiest way to get a man to leave you alone. Because he respects another man more than you. #yesallwomen", "I shouldn't have to hold my car keys in hand like a weapon & check over my shoulder every few seconds when I walk at night #YesAllWomen", and "Because every single woman I know has a story about a man feeling entitled to access to her body. Every. Single. One. #YesAllWomen."

== Reach and impact ==
Within four days of the first use of #YesAllWomen, the hashtag had been tweeted 1.2 million times, surpassing predecessors that also drew attention to violence and sexism toward women. Four days after its first use, The Guardian commentator Jessica Valenti wrote that the YesAllWomen hashtag helped illustrate the prevalence of everyday sexism against women. Rebecca Solnit described it as a watershed moment "in which you could see change happen" and credited it for popularizing the concept of "sexual entitlement", which she characterized as male fury at women for not having met their emotional or sexual needs. In an interview with Democracy Now!, Solnit stated that the hashtag helped change the way that society talks about rape. Cynthia Calkins Mercado, an associate professor of psychology, told The Kansas City Star that the hashtag changed her mind about the prevalence of misogyny in American society, and has raised awareness of women's experiences. Writing in The New Yorker, Sasha Weiss called the campaign "a kind of memorial, a stern demand for a more just society", and praised Twitter as a powerful vehicle for activism.

=== Cartoon controversy ===
On June 1, 2014, cartoonists Michael Kupperman and David Rees were scheduled to release a political cartoon entitled "Testosterone Entitlement Theatre Presents: The Man-Babies in 'Hashtag Harassment!'" for The New York Times's Sunday installment's "See Something, Say Something" that satirized the men's rights movement's response to the hashtag. However, the newspaper believed that "the subject matter (male rage, online bullying & the hashtag #yesallwomen) was 'too sensitive'" to publish and refused to print it. In response to the editorial decision, both Kupperman and Rees uploaded the comic strip independently. That weekend, The New York Times published a different comic by Brian McFadden that tackled similar issues.

=== Criticism ===
Samantha Levine, a columnist at The Daily Beast, wrote that conflating dress code restrictions and men whistling at women with the Isla Vista killings risks women who have been victims of violence not being taken seriously when they use the hashtag. Emily Shire criticized some #YesAllWomen tweets as trivial in the context of the Isla Vista killings, citing examples such as "I've never seen a hot husband with a fat wife on a sitcom."

== See also ==
- Hashtag activism – Use of hashtags for internet activism
- Me Too movement – Social movement against sexual abuse and harassment
- Feminist separatism – Theory of women's separation from men
- NotAllMen – Hashtag and popular Internet meme
- Political lesbianism – Movement in lesbian feminism
- Stereotype – Generalized belief about people
- Who Needs Feminism – Social media photo campaign started by students at Duke University in 2012
- Women's rights in 2014 – Time period in Women's right movement
