= Altrincham Grammar School for Boys =

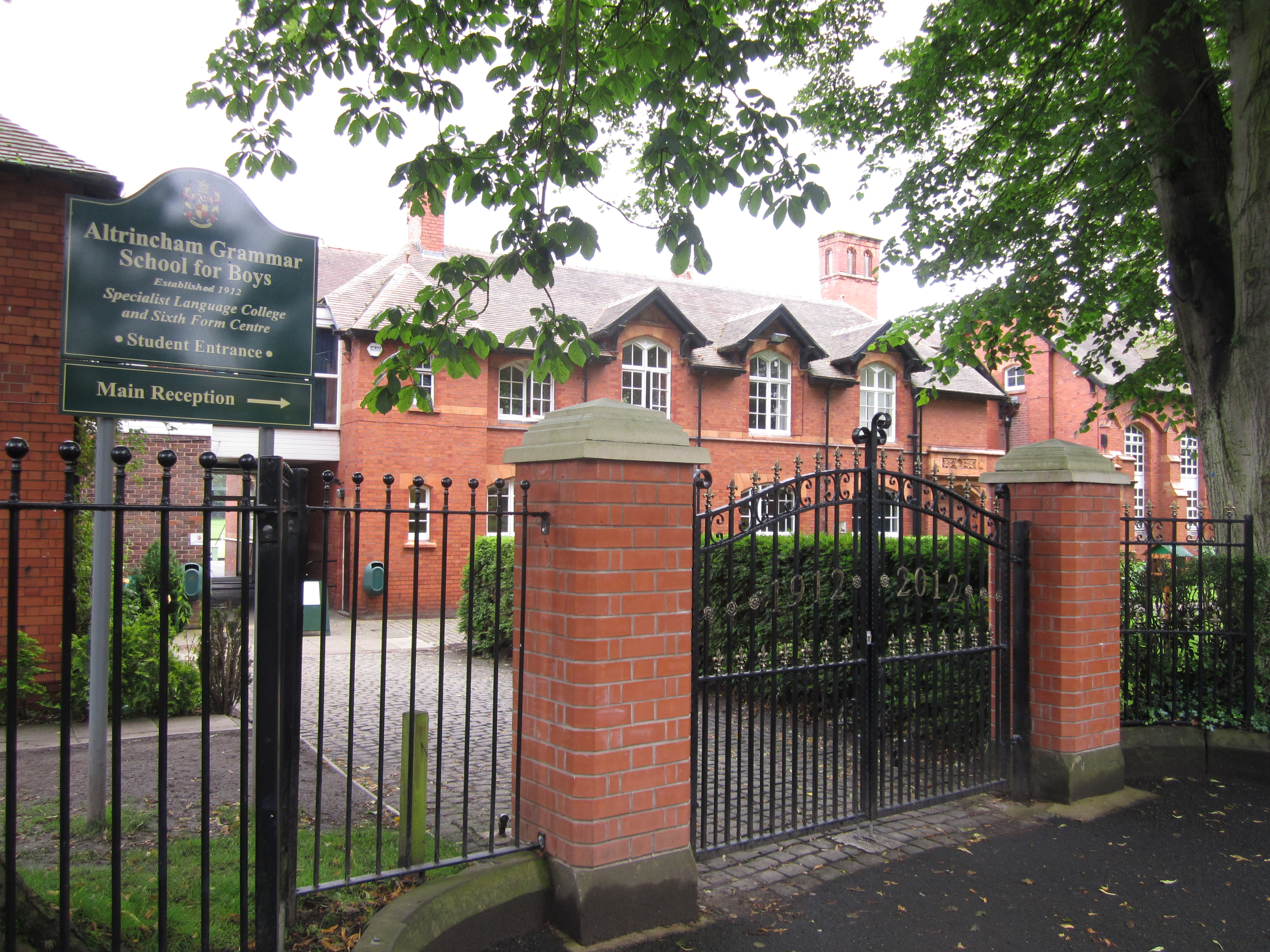

Location
- Marlborough Road; Altrincham, Greater Manchester, England, WA14 2RS; 53°22′37″N 2°21′04″W

Information
- Type: Grammar school; Academy
- Motto: Labor Omnia Vincit (Work Conquers All)
- Established: 1912
- Trust: Hamblin Education Trust
- Department for Education URN: 136458 Tables
- Ofsted: Reports
- Head Master: Ian Dicksee
- Gender: Boys
- Age: 11 to 18
- Enrolment: c.1400
- Houses: Tatton, Massey, Stamford, Bradbury
- Colours: Green and red
- Website: www.agsb.co.uk

Altrincham Grammar School for Boys is a selective boys' grammar school in Altrincham, Greater Manchester, England.

== Admissions ==
The school is a fully selective non-fee paying grammar school with admission via an entrance exam. Its previous status as a foundation school allowed for a degree of independence from the local education authority, until in 2011, under the government's education reforms, it attained Academy status.

== History ==
At the turn of the 20th century, the residential suburbs of Altrincham, Bowdon and Hale and neighbouring areas like Timperley, Sale, and Knutsford were expanding rapidly but they lacked a dedicated grammar school. Judge Bradbury, a passionate advocate for education, led the charge to establish a high-quality secondary school in the area.

The school was founded as Altrincham County High School for Boys (''as it was known until 1934'') in 1912 as a result of the Balfour Education Act, to provide secondary education (partly fee-paying) for an area which stretched from Sale to Knutsford.

Sir Alfred Hopkinson, the Vice Chancellor of Manchester University officially opened the school. The school had 57 pupils and 3 staff (Headmaster, Deputy and one Secretary), housed in the red brick building which still forms the central block of the school today.

The original building, designed by renowned architect Harry Beswick, was both practical and forward-thinking for its time. It was to be situated on a newly constructed road in Bowdon and included form rooms, a library, art and science spaces, a dining hall, and a gymnasium built to accommodate around 125 pupils.

- The south wing and the assembly hall were added in 1938 and the science block, gymnasium and workshops in 1964.
- In 1974, the school passed from the control of Cheshire County Council to the newly formed Trafford Metropolitan Borough Council. It remained under Trafford's control until 1996 when it became a grant-maintained school. In 1999, it became a foundation school.
- In 2003, the Department for Education and Skills (DfES) awarded the school specialist school status as a Language College.
- In 2013, a new physics centre was opened by the physicist Brian Cox, housing six laboratories, a staff room and a large preparation room.
- In 2019, a House System was introduced with four houses; Tatton, Bradbury, Stamford and Massey.
- In 2021, the school completed a new building with an additional nine classrooms (primarily used for English and Geology), a new library, extra toilets and a small staff room.
- In 2021, the annual charity event called 'UTSAV' first occurred. This event brought together hundreds of local students through performances, food, and a DJ. They raised over £2000 pounds in 2021, and since have raised over £30,000 across UTSAV 2022, 2023, 2024 and 2025, with the latter three being organised by a group called 'Trafford Hindu Society' with students from both Sale Grammar School and Altrincham Grammar School for Girls.
- In 2023, five new cricket nets and two new cricket strips were installed.

== Notable former pupils ==
- Paul Allott – former Lancashire and England cricketer and currently Director of Cricket at Lancashire
- Roger Ashton-Griffiths – film actor
- Alan Barnes – jazz musician
- Verner Bickley – colonial administrator
- Sir Graham Brady – former Conservative MP for Altrincham and Sale West and Chairman of the 1922 Committee
- Ian Brown – solo artist and lead singer of the indie rock band The Stone Roses (testified against former teacher Fred Talbot)
- Ewan Clarkson – author
- Nick Cohen – journalist and author
- Brendan Creed – Great Britain and England field hockey player
- Ashley Taylor Dawson – Hollyoaks actor
- Mark Foster – record-producer and DJ
- Ronald Gow – dramatist, who returned to the school to teach in the 1920s
- Prof Ian Hargreaves – Editor of The Independent from 1994 to 1996, and the New Statesman from 1996–8
- John Hopkins – conductor of the BBC Northern Orchestra from 1952 to 1957, founder of the New Zealand Youth Orchestra and Director of Music at the Australian Broadcasting Commission 1963–73
- Steve Jackson – Co-founder of Games Workshop and Lionhead
- Sir Ian Livingstone – Executive Chairman of Eidos Interactive, co-founder of Games Workshop and publisher of Tomb Raider and Lara Croft
- James Mazarelo – Great Britain and England field hockey player
- Prof John Morrill – Professor of British and Irish History at the University of Cambridge
- John Squire – Lead guitarist of the indie rock band The Stone Roses
- Anthony Taylor – Premier League referee
- Andrew Western – Labour MP for Stretford and Urmston and Minister for Transformation at the Department for Work and Pensions
- Simon Wolstencroft – Rock drummer with The Fall; also played with early incarnations of The Smiths and The Stone Roses

=== Former teachers ===
- Fred Talbot – weather forecaster (taught biology; convicted of indecent assault against two boys at the school)

== The Old Altrinchamians' Association ==
The Old Altrinchamians' Association is a former pupils' society with golf, football and cricket sections. The Association also holds an Annual Reunion Dinner and publishes an annual newsletter.

== Feeder schools ==
Most of the schools in the local area enter their qualifying students into the 11+ exams. The school does have a catchment area where pupils living nearby are prioritised over those living further away. The priority catchment area is defined as the Postal addresses of WA13/WA14/WA15/M33 and M23 which lie within the Trafford Local Authority. However, some students travel all the way from Warrington and Stockport and thus commute to and from school. Students use the local Hale railway station, Altrincham Interchange, and school bus routes to do this.
