= Who Needs Feminism? =

Social media photo campaign started by students at Duke University in 2012

Who Needs Feminism? is a social media photo campaign started by students at Duke University in 2012. The campaign attempted to shed light on misconceptions about feminism and to explore the continued need and relevance of feminism in today's society. The campaign was most successful in its outreach with Tumblr, but the campaign received attention of Facebook and Twitter as well.

== Origin ==
The Who Needs Feminism? campaign was conceived by sixteen Duke students as the final project for a class called "Women in the Public Sphere: History, Theory and Practice" taught by Dr. Rachel Seidman. The students wanted to address what they saw as misconceptions on Duke's campus about the feminist movement and its relevance in today's society. They also hoped to promote a dialogue on the topic within the Duke community, "hoping to address relevance of feminism to all different types of people," according to an interview done with GOOD worldwide.

According to their website, the members wanted to "explain what feminism is by allowing everyone to create their own definition." They started by creating posters which they placed around campus, showing young men and women from a variety of backgrounds holding up whiteboards with the words "I need feminism because...", to show that there is no "typical feminist," with the title of the campaign imposed on the poster. Subjects were chosen to demonstrate the importance of feminism to individuals from different genders, races, sexual orientations and backgrounds, reflecting the students' beliefs that "'typical feminists' don't exist" and that feminism is important for everyone, not just women. In addition to designing and hanging the posters, the students also wrote an Op-Ed piece for The Chronicle, Duke's student-run newspaper, explaining the project and their motivations.

The students also relied on social media as "the most popular way to get the word out right now." The students created interactive Tumblr, Facebook, and Twitter accounts for the project. Although they expected the Facebook account to serve as the main social media outlet for promoting the project, the Tumblr account "really took off." One student suggested that the site encouraged discussion without the moderation that the Facebook page required. The Who Needs Feminism? team reported that the Facebook page received over 4,200 likes within 36 hours of the project's launch, while the Tumblr account was viewed by almost 13,000 people in over 2,000 different cities.

=== Reactions ===
The campaign that began at Duke University spread to many colleges across the nation. But while the campaign did spark interest, it also experienced backlash. On Duke's campus, many of the posters were torn down or vandalized. Some of the vandals added signs to the posters reading "I need feminism because sandwiches can't make themselves," or "I need feminism because it's funny watching them try to play sports." The online outlets also experienced significant backlash in the comments made on the movement in general and individual submissions. One of the largest incidents of backlash was the Women against Feminism campaign that was created. This group took the original campaign's ideas of creating posters and changed the words to "I don't need feminism..." and posted them.

== Spread ==
After its start at Duke, a number of different colleges, universities, and other organizations instituted their own campaigns. The original Duke campaign created a start up guide to assist the efforts of other institutions to carry out a Who Needs Feminism? campaign.

In addition to colleges and universities, Who Needs Feminism has been adopted by a number of other institutions and organizations. For instance, feminists in India started their own Tumblr account to encourage submissions. Feminism in India, a digital feminist media platform, was founded by Japleen Pasricha, a research scholar at Jawaharlal Nehru University. Pasricha claimed that the movement was required to "unravel the F-word and demystify all the negativity surrounding it." Pasricha organised a campaign at Indira Gandhi Institute of Technology and Ambedkar University Delhi on April 15, 2014, which exceeded its goal of 100 photographs. Organisations such as the National Council of Women of New Zealand, North York Women's Centre, and National Young Feminist Leader Conference have started campaigns and shared the images through the original Who Needs Feminism? Facebook page. The group UK Feminista started their own Tumblr and Facebook page, soliciting submissions at events such as the Glastonbury Festival and encouraging people to start their own campaigns at schools and colleges.

As with the original campaign, these spin-off campaigns have received criticism and backlash. The efforts of students at Altrincham Grammar School for Girls to participate in the campaign led to what one student described as a "torrent of degrading and explicitly sexual comments" when their pictures were published online; some of the participants received threatening messages. Student Jinan Younis accused the school of failing to take action against the perpetrators and thus failing to support the participating students, while the school issued a statement recommending that students remove words or images they had placed online "that could compromise their safety or that of other students at the school."

== See also ==
- Domestic violence
- Glass ceiling
- Political lesbianism
- Rape culture
- Separatist Feminism
- Sexual harassment
- Women Against Feminism
- YesAllWomen
- Me too (hashtag)
