= Altrincham Grammar School for Girls =

Location
- Cavendish Road; Bowdon; Altrincham, Greater Manchester, WA14 2NL; England; 53°22′52″N 2°21′38″W

Information
- Type: Grammar school; Academy
- Motto: Fortiter, Fideliter, Feliciter; Bravely, Faithfully and Cheerfully
- Established: 1910
- Founder: Cliff Wright
- Department for Education URN: 137289 Tables
- Ofsted: Reports
- Chair: Martyn Wilshaw
- Headteacher: Stephanie Gill
- Gender: Girls
- Age: 11 to 18
- Enrolment: 1,350
- Also called: Altrincham Girls Grammar School; AGGS
- Website: https://aggs.bright-futures.co.uk/

Altrincham Grammar School for Girls, also known as Altrincham Girls Grammar School (AGGS) is a girls' grammar school with academy status in Bowdon, Greater Manchester, England. With about 1,250 students aged 11 to 18, it is the biggest single-sex grammar school in England.

== History ==
Altrincham Grammar School for Girls was founded in 1910. With many other schools, it was a product of the Education Act 1902, which set out to build schools to provide enhanced education for girls. Originally dual schools for girls and boys were envisaged for the site, which had been occupied by a substantial derelict house with spacious grounds, Bowdon Lodge. However, it was finally agreed that there was insufficient space for both, and the girls' school was built there and Altrincham County High School for Boys, now Altrincham Grammar School for Boys, was built elsewhere.

The building was designed to accommodate one hundred and eighty children, thirty of whom were of nursery age, and the school was opened on Monday, 4 July 1910. By September 1910, the school had sixty pupils. Three full-time and five part-time staff were employed. In 1931, the school's 21st anniversary, it lost most of its preparatory department. The headmistress for the first twenty-three years of AGGS was Miss Mary Howes Smith; she retired in 1933.

During the late 1960s the school expanded further, across Cavendish Road and into a large Victorian villa known as 'Breeze Hill'. The villa had extensive grounds, which the school put to good use with a number of Portakabin-like classroom structures. The rooms within the villa were also made into classrooms including a large art room which benefited from the light from the large Victorian windows. The pupils had to cross Cavendish Road, sometimes a number of times each day, and the road was fairly busy, causing safety issues.

In 1983, Fairlie was built on the opposite side of Cavendish Road. The school has had developments to the main school building as well, beginning with the science block at the East Wing was built, and continuing with a reception area and dining room, plus a science staffroom and four science labs. The west wing, with a library, was added in 2003. The most recent addition to AGGS is the new Breeze Hill, replacing an older building of the same name and including three geography and history rooms and an ICT suite as well as a room where courses and conferences for teachers from around the North-West are held.

In 2010 the school celebrated its centenary year; a centenary garden was built in commemoration.

In 2011, the headmistress from 1997 onward, Dame Dana Ross-Wawrzynski, set up the Bright Futures Educational Trust (originally the AGGS Academy Trust) This is a partnership between AGGS and disadvantaged schools around East Manchester which attempts to help failing schools improve their performance. It began with Cedar Mount High School, now Cedar Mount Academy, which is in Gorton, Manchester. Teachers from AGGS were sent on a temporary post to help teachers at Cedar Mount to improve their techniques.

Mary Speakman took over as headteacher in 2012, and Stephanie Gill in 2014.

In December 2017, the school announced it was introducing a gender-neutral policy in communications for the sake of transgender and gender-questioning students, and would transition away from describing pupils as "girls".

The school site has been used by many production companies; the BBC used the Main Hall for the CBBC show All at Sea and it was later used by Netflix as the school in the TV series, Safe.

== Results ==
AGGS is one of the highest achieving schools in England and has gained status as a language college. In 2022 Ofsted found school staff to "provide an exceptional quality of education for pupils". The report also stated that "pupils and students achieve exceptionally well across the curriculum". In 2023, 99.9% of GCSE grades were passed at grades 9-4, with 46.2% of all grades achieved being grade 9s - the highest grade available. A-Level grades for 2023 were similarly high, with 94.5% of all entries passed at grades A*-C, and 59.6% at grades A*-A. In the 2024 Sunday Times Parent Power guide, the school was named as the 10th best state school in the country.

== Feminist society controversy ==
In the 2010s students started a feminist society and engaged with a national campaign called Who Needs Feminism, which involved posting pictures online of themselves holding placards with statements about their feminist convictions. After students received threats and abuse online in response to the pictures, school management, which had initially been supportive, asked that they be taken down. One of the students then published an op-ed in The Guardian accusing the school of failing to protect its students. The school's statement in response said that they only "recommend[ed]" that the pictures be removed. The students' campaign has since gone national after coverage on BBC Radio 4's Woman's Hour.

== See also ==
Category:People educated at Altrincham Grammar School For Girls
