= Atlantic salt marsh mink =

Atlantic salt marsh mink Temporal range: Holocene–recent

Conservation status
- Vulnerable (NatureServe)

Scientific classification
- Kingdom: Animalia
- Phylum: Chordata
- Class: Mammalia
- Order: Carnivora
- Family: Mustelidae
- Genus: Neogale
- Species: N. vison
- Subspecies: N. v. lutensis

Trinomial name
- Neogale vison lutensis (Bangs, 1898)
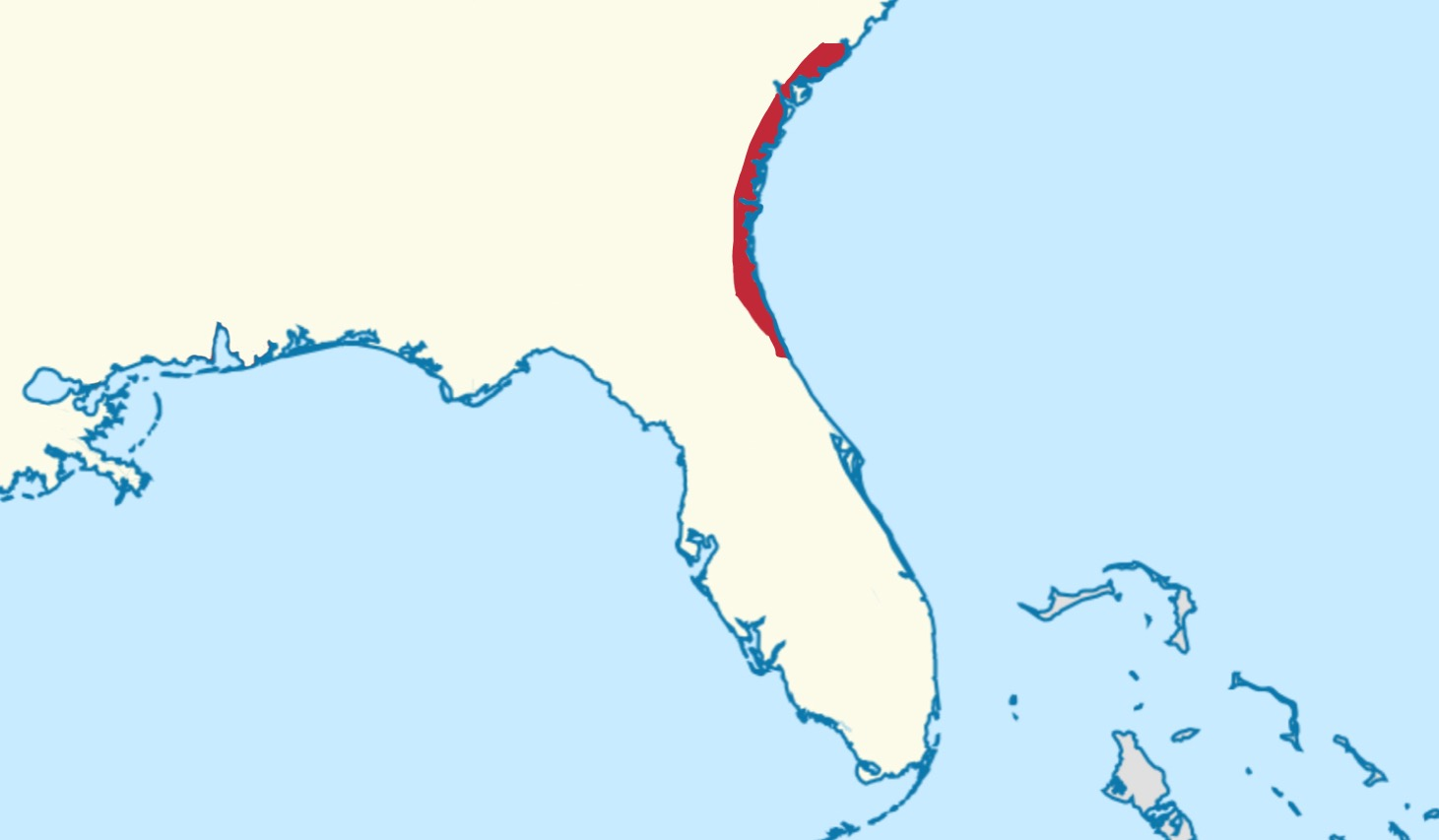
- Range in 2007

Subspecies of carnivore

The Atlantic salt marsh mink (Neogale vison lutensis), or Florida mink is a subspecies of the American mink (Neogale vison). The Atlantic salt marsh mink is one of four subspecies of mink found in Florida.

The mink have been tracked down "by using an upside-down bucket floating on a small raft", which proved to be more successful than the initial "spotlight" method.

== Geographic distribution ==
The Atlantic salt marsh mink is strictly found on the eastern coastal marshes of northern Florida, Georgia and southern South Carolina. They are mostly found in Nassau County and Duval County.

== Description ==
=== Build ===
The Atlantic salt marsh mink is different than other kinds of mink by its medium size and large head. The subspecies' teeth are large, and the only other kind of mink that has upper molars as large is the Southern mink of Louisiana (Neogale vison vulgivaga). Its tail is rather shorter than other kinds of mink.

=== Fur ===
The Atlantic salt marsh mink's fur generally more pale than other of other mink. Its colour ranges from "russet to clay or reddish brown".
