= NotAllMen =

Hashtag and popular Internet meme

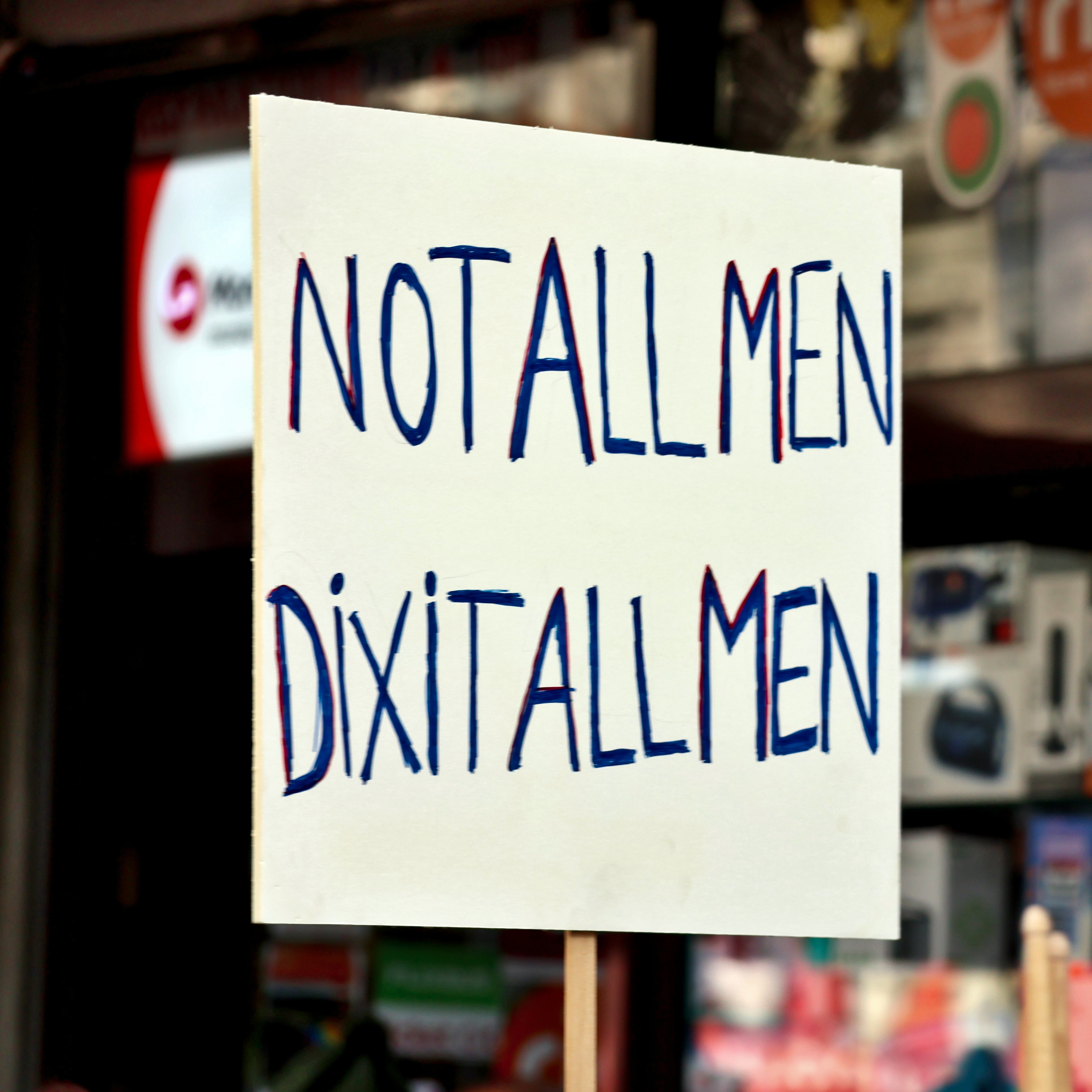
A NotAllMen sign at a 2026 women's right manifestation in Paris

The hashtag #NotAllMen is a feminist Internet meme. A shortening of the phrase "not all men are like that" (sometimes abbreviated NAMALT), it is a satirical parody of arguments used to deflect attention away from men in discussions of sexual assault, the gender pay gap, and other feminist issues.

== Origins and usage ==
=== Response to feminist discourse ===
The phrase "not all men are like that" has been in use online since the mid-2000s as a general defense of men. It was used as a catchphrase among men's rights activists (MRAs) in response to online discussions of misogyny or sexual abuse which they saw as blaming all men as perpetrators.

Jess Zimmerman writes that before 2013, "not all men" was absent from discussions of popular derailment tactics used in response to feminist discourse; in its place were phrases such as "'what about the men?' and 'patriarchy hurts men too'—pleas for inclusion, not for exemption". Zimmerman also highlights a use of the phrase dating to 1985 in Joanna Russ's novel On Strike Against God, where a character muses:

... that not all men make more money than all women, only most; that not all men are rapists, only some; that not all men are promiscuous killers, only some; that not all men control Congress, the Presidency, the police, the army, industry, agriculture, law, science, medicine, architecture, and local government, only some.

Writing at The Awl, John Herrman lists additional uses of the phrase as far back as 1863. In Charles Dickens' 1836 novel The Pickwick Papers, the character Miss Wardle says, "Men are such deceivers", to which another character replies, "They are, they are ... but not all men."

=== Popularization as a meme ===
Kelsey McKinney writes at Vox that the phrase "not all men" has been "reappropriated by feminists and turned into a meme meant to parody its pervasiveness and bad faith". Both the phrase and hashtag "#NotAllMen" have been used as a satire of defensive reactions by men. The first appearance of the meme in popular media was a satirical tweet by Shafiqah Hudson in 2013 that quickly went viral:

ME: Men and boys are socially instructed to not listen to us. They are taught to interrupt us when we– RANDOM MAN: Excuse me. Not ALL men."

The following year, the phrase was added to an image of the Kool-Aid man crashing through a wall, a Tumblr page featured images in which a speech bubble with the phrase "not all men" was added to images from movies such as the shark from Jaws and the chestburster from Alien, and artist Mattie Lubchansky created a webcomic with the character "Not-All-Man", in which the "defender of the defended" and "voice for the voiceful" breaks through a glass window to interrupt a pink-haired woman complaining about men. The comic was retweeted and reblogged tens of thousands of times, and shared by celebrities including Wil Wheaton, Paul F. Tompkins, Matt Fraction, and John Scalzi.

Other #NotAllMen-related memes include references to Aquaman, Adventure Time, and Magic: The Gathering. A 2024 study published in Humanities and Social Sciences Communications analyzed comments on Reddit and Twitter and found a transformative use of the hashtag #NotAllMen, finding that there were women and men supporters of both perpetrators and victims of gender-based violence. Many men in social media call out sexism, violence and discrimination, a fact that many feminist women value because their aim is to join as many people as possible in the fight to end all gender violence.

=== 2014 Isla Vista killings ===
#NotAllMen was already a Twitter hashtag before the 2014 Isla Vista killings, but it gained additional traction after the event, because of the hatred against women expressed by the killer. In response to the "not all men" argument, an anonymous Twitter user created the hashtag #YesAllWomen to express that all women are affected by sexism and misogyny. This newly created hashtag was used by women to share their experiences of sexual discrimination and attacks on social media.

=== Bengaluru incident ===
After reports of a mass molestation occurring at India's Bengaluru New Year's Eve celebration in 2017, #NotAllMen began trending on Twitter. This drew an angry reaction from women, with many Indian feminists and women strongly criticizing the hashtag while responding with their own hashtag #YesAllWomen.

== See also ==
- All Lives Matter – Counterslogan to Black Lives Matter
- Mansplaining – Act of explaining in a condescending manner
- Sealioning – Type of trolling or harassment
- Toxic masculinity – Social sciences concept
