= Ewan Clarkson =

English author

Ewan Clarkson (23 January 1929 – 19 April 2010) was an English author specialising in books about nature, particularly wild animals.

== Life and career ==
Clarkson was born in Workington on 23 January 1929. He was educated at Altrincham Grammar School and served in the Royal Army Medical Corps between 1947 and 1949.

Clarkson, who before becoming a full-time writer worked as a veterinary surgeon, was later to state that "for twenty-five years I laboured under the illusion that I was a scientist. I worked as a laboratory assistant after school to study for my Bachelor of Science. Then I was a veterinarian for the People's Dispensary for Sick Animals. When I realised that I became too emotionally involved with my charges [...] I rebelled against the objective, unemotional approach of the scientist and went to Devon where I could write". Before the publication of his first book he also worked as a beach photographer, rabbit farmer, and as a lorry driver for the Ministry of Defence at Denbury Camp, Newton Abbot.

His first book was Break for Freedom, also published in the United States as Syla, the Mink (1968), telling the story of a mink escaping from a fur farm in Devon, and showing the influence of Henry Williamson's stories about Devon wildlife. Clarkson gave a particular focus to the impact of man's activities on nature, a theme he developed in subsequent works, following Break for Freedom with Halic, the Story of a Grey Seal in 1970, and a number of other novels and non-fiction wildlife books. He was an early critic of the use of pesticides and several of his works explore the negative effects on the environment of intensive farming methods.

Clarkson's books often appeared on both adults' and children's lists, and he stated that education was one of the main purposes of his writing. Clarkson also wrote several books on animals aimed specifically at younger children, as well as many magazine articles about angling: an accomplished fisherman, he was regarded as a pioneer of saltwater fly fishing techniques.

Clarkson, who lived in Newton Abbot, died on 19 April 2010.

== Personal life ==
Clarkson married in 1951 and had two children.

== Selected bibliography ==
- Break for Freedom (1968) (U.S.A. Title: Syla, the Mink)
- Halic: The Story of a Gray Seal (1970)
- The Running of the Deer (1972)
- In The Shadow of the Falcon (1973)
- Wolf Country: A Wilderness Pilgrimage (1975)
- The Badgers of Summercombe (1977)
- Many-forked Branch (1980)
- The Wake of the Storm (1983)
- Ice Trek (1986)
- King of the Wild (1990)
- The Flight of the Osprey (1996)
