= C. africana =

C. africana may refer to:

- Chlamydoselachus africana, the southern African frilled shark, a shark species
- Clathrina africana, a sponge species
- Claviceps africana, a fungus sorghum pathogen species
- Cleopatra africana, a freshwater snail species
- Cnemaspis africana, a gecko species found in Central Africa
- Chrysomyza africana, a picture-winged fly species
- Constricta africana, a fungus species
- Coralliophila africana
- Cordia africana, a tree species
- Cunninghamella africana, a fungus species

== Synonyms ==
- Carissa africana, a synonym for Carissa spinarum, the conkerberry or bush plum, a large shrub species

== See also ==
- Africana (disambiguation)
