= C. floribunda =

C. floribunda may refer to:

- Calceolaria floribunda, a perennial plant
- Calycopteris floribunda, a climbing shrub
- Candollea floribunda, a dicotyledonous plant
- Canna floribunda, a garden plant
- Carmichaelia floribunda, a legume native to New Zealand
- Cassia floribunda, a flowering plant
- Catopsis floribunda, a plant native to Venezuela and the United States
- Cephalanthera floribunda, an orchid with rhizomes
- Cerbera floribunda, an Oceanian plant
- Chailletia floribunda, an African plant
- Chasmanthe floribunda, a crocus native to southern Africa
- Clidemia floribunda, a glory bush
- Colona floribunda, a Southeast Asian plant
- Cratylia floribunda, a legume found in Brazil
- Crocodeilanthe floribunda, a flowering plant
- Cryptantha floribunda, a cat's eye
- Cyanea floribunda, a plant endemic to Hawaii
- Cyphomandra floribunda, a New World plant
