= C. compacta =

C. compacta may refer to:

- Canna compacta, a plant species distributed between the south of Brazil and northern Argentina
- Catopsis compacta, a plant species endemic to Mexico
- Clathrina compacta, a sponge species
- Cochliopina compacta, a very small freshwater snail species endemic to Mexico

== See also ==
- Compacta (disambiguation)
