= Constricta =

Constricta may refer to:

- Constricta (fungus), a fungus genus in the family Agaricaceae
- Constricta (snail), a land snail genus in the family Clausiliidae
