= Arturia tenuipilosa =

Scientific classification
- Kingdom: Animalia
- Phylum: Porifera
- Class: Calcarea
- Order: Clathrinida
- Family: Clathrinidae
- Genus: Arturia
- Species: A. tenuipilosa

Binomial name
- Arturia tenuipilosa (Dendy, 1905)

Synonyms
- Clathrina tenuipilosa (Dendy, 1905); Leucosolenia (Clathrina) tenuipilosa Dendy, 1905

Species of sponge

Arturia tenuipilosa is a species of calcareous sponge from South India and Sri Lanka. The name refers to the very thin, hair-like oxea present in this species.

== Description ==
Sponge forming massive, reticulate colonies of asconoid tubes, closely resembling Clathrina ceylonensis but somewhat coarser. Here and there on the surface of the colony the tubes converge to unite in small, prominent true vents. The tubes themselves are about 0.5 mm in diameter and they form a close reticulation without any pseudoderm. The colour in alcohol is pale grey. There are three kinds of spicules: regular triradiates, quadriradiates and very slender, hair-like oxea.

The regular triradiates have rather stout, slightly fusiform rays, bluntly and rather abruptly pointed at the apex, which is often somewhat irregular. The rays measure about 0.1 mm in length by 0.012 mm in diameter at the thickest part.

The quadriradiates are abundant and resemble the triradiates, but with an apical ray projecting at right angles into the gastral cavity. This ray is somewhat variable in form and size; typically it is long and slender, gradually and sharply pointed, and slightly undulated towards the extremity; in the type specimen it attains a length of about 0.14 mm.

The very slender, hair-like oxea sparsely hispidate the surface of the tubes. These may attain a length of more than 0.4 mm, with an average diameter of only about 0.002 mm. They taper very gradually from the proximal extremity, which is somewhat hastately sharp-pointed and may be as much as 0.004 mm thick, to the distal, which is hair-like and apparently nearly always broken off.
