= Arturia (sponge) =

Scientific classification
- Kingdom: Animalia
- Phylum: Porifera
- Class: Calcarea
- Order: Clathrinida
- Family: Clathrinidae
- Genus: Arturia; Azevedo, Padua, Moraes, Rossi, Muricy & Klautau, 2017

Synonyms
- Arthuria Klautau, Azevedo, Cóndor-Luján, Rapp, Collins & Russo, 2013

Genus of sponges

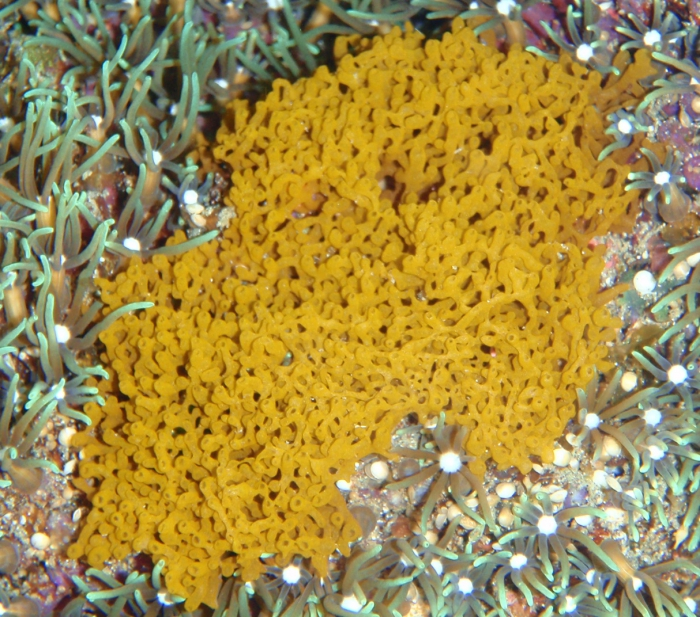
Arthuria tubuloreticulosa

Arturia is a genus of calcareous sponge in the family Clathrinidae which contains eleven species. It is named after Arthur Dendy, a prominent researcher of calcareous sponges. It was renamed Arturia in 2017 because the name Arthuria was already assigned to a genus of molluscs.

== Description and biology ==
Calcinea in which the cormus comprised a typical clathroid body. A stalk may be present. The skeleton contains regular (equiangular and equiradiate) triactines and tetractines. However, tetractines are more rare. Diactines may be added. Asconoid aquiferous system.

Arturia canariensis, for example, is a filter feeder, sieving plankton and other organic material out of the current of water as it passes through the ostia. Both asexual reproduction by budding and sexual reproduction take place in Arturia canariensis. As in other species, each sponge is a hermaphrodite. Sperm is liberated into the sea and some is drawn into other sponges with the water current that passes through them. Fertilisation is then internal and the eggs are brooded in the ascon tubes of the sponge until they hatch. The free-swimming larvae are expelled through the osculi and disperse with the currents. After a few days they settle on the seabed and develop into juvenile sponges.

== Species ==
There are eleven species in the Arturia genus.

Name	Image	Distribution	Description
Arturia africana (Klautau & Valentine, 2003)		South Africa	The cormus is formed of thin, irregular and loosely anastomosed tubes. No water-collecting tubes or cells with granules have been observed. The skeleton has no special organisation, comprising triactines and tetractines that are at equal angles to each other and radiate equally. Actines are conical, slightly undulated at the distal part, and with a sharp tip. The apical actine of the tetractines is shorter, smooth, conical, straight and sharp, and it is always projected into the tubes.
Arturia alcatraziensis (Lanna, Rossi, Cavalcanti, Hajdu & Klautau, 2007)		Brazil	Living specimens are white and preserved ones are beige. The cormus is spherical, composed of thin, regular and tightly anastomosed tubes including water-collecting tubes. External tubes have narrower cavities than internal ones. Surface is covered minute spines because of the large amount of diactines (spicule with two pointed arms). The skeleton is composed primarily of straight, conical and sharp spicule with two or three pointed arms but in rare instances may have four. The spicules with three and four pointed arms have no special organisation (they have equal angles and radiate equally) but the apical spicule (of the three pointed arms) is projected inside the tubes. The spicules with two sharp pointed arms are slightly spindle-shaped, and have the spines perpendicular to the surface. The size of the diactines is very variable. Several three-pronged oxeas are present on the surface.
Arturia canariensis (Miklucho-Maclay, 1868)		Canary Islands, Cape Verde, Adriatic Sea, Caribbean Sea (Gulf of Mexico, Bahamas, Dry Tortugas, Florida, Bermuda)	Has a small, lacy structure and is a bright lemon yellow colour. It is an asconoid with many tiny flask-like tubes. Water is drawn in through fine holes near their base, the ostia, moved along by flagella and expelled from the osculi at the top, each osculum being a single exit formed from many fused ascon tubes. The skeleton is composed of large calcareous spicules called megascleres, made predominantly of calcite, forming a soft, fragile, supporting network. The whole sponge can grow to 10 centimetres (3.9 in) in diameter. Small individuals form tufts but larger ones have gentle folds, with osculi along their ridges. It is usually found at depths between 8 and 23 metres (26 and 75 ft). It grows on shady rock substrates and in caves but its preferred location is the underside of ledges formed by horizontal, plate-like layers of coral. It is often found growing in these locations with coralline algae and bryozoans in a rich, diverse community. In a 2007 survey of sponges off the coast of Georgia, Arturia canariensis was discovered in cryptic locations under rocks, in crevices and overgrown by other organisms. This was an extension of its previous known range.
Arturia compacta (Schuffner, 1877)		Indonesia	
Arturia dubia (Dendy, 1891)		Australia	Cormus formed of irregular and loosely anastomosed tubes. There is no cortex but sometimes it appears that some of the tubes could be forming one. The wall of the tubes is thick, up to 100 μm. In some areas the tubes are hispid. Cells with yellow granules are present in the mesohyl, as are embryos, which are always found near choanocytes. The cells with yellow granules are distributed homogeneously, throughout the mesohyl. The skeleton consists of equiangular and equiradiate triactines. Tetractines are also present, but they are rare. Actines are conical or cylindrical, but they always have sharp tips. Sometimes, they are slightly undulated. Diactines are abundant on the external tubes; they are curved or straight, vary in size and have sharp tips, one of which is club-shaped. The largest diactines are curved at the tip. They project through the surface in some parts of the cormus only, and the club-shaped portion of the spicule lies inside the tube.
Arturia hirsuta (Klautau & Valentine, 2003)		South Africa	Cormus composed of large, irregular and loosely anastomosed tubes. Water-collecting tubes converge to form conical projections with an osculum. The surface of the tubes is hispid because of the presence of diactines and trichoxea. Cells with granules have not been observed. The skeleton comprises equiangular and equiradiate triactines and very few tetractines. Actines are conical and straight, with a sharp tip. Diactines and fusiform and slightly curved. They are projected towards the exterior of the tubes. Trichoxeas are also present, perpendicular to the surface of the tubes.
Arturia passionensis (van Soest, Kaiser & van Syoc, 2011)		Clipperton Island	
Arturia spirallata Azevedo, Cóndor-Luján, Willenz, Hajdu, Hooker & Klautau, 2015		Peru	
Arturia sueziana (Klautau & Valentine, 2003)		Egypt	Cormus of the holotype formed of thin, irregular and loosely anastomosed tubes. A large tube functioning as an osculum is physically connected to thinner water-connecting tubes, receiving the excurrent water from them. The skeleton has no special organization, comprising equiangular and equiradiate triactines and tetractines in roughly the same proportions. They are similar in size. Their actines are cylindrical or conical, with a blunt tip. Some of them are larger in the middle. The apical actine of the tetractines has almost the same diameter at the base as the facial actines. It is conical, shorter, straight, smooth and sharp. Trichoxeas are also present but there are very few.
Arturia tenuipilosa (Dendy, 1905)		Sri Lanka	Sponge forming massive reticulate colonies of asconoid tubes, closely resembling Clathrina ceylonensis but somewhat coarser. Here and there on the surface of the colony the tubes converge to unite in small, prominent true vents. The tubes themselves are about 0.5 mm in diameter and they form a close reticulation without any pseudoderm. The colour in alcohol is pale grey. There are three kinds of spicules: regular triradiates, quadriradiates and very slender, hair-like oxea. The regular triradiates have rather stout, slightly fusiform rays, bluntly and rather abruptly pointed at the apex, which is often somewhat irregular. The rays measure about 0.1 mm in length by 0.012 mm in diameter at the thickest part. The quadriradiates are abundant and resemble the triradiates, but with an apical ray projecting at right angles into the gastral cavity. This ray is somewhat variable in form and size; typically it is long and slender, gradually and sharply pointed, and slightly undulated towards the extremity; in the type specimen it attains a length of about 0.14 mm. The very slender, hair-like oxea sparsely hispidate the surface of the tubes. These may attain a length of more than 0.4 mm, with an average diameter of only about 0.002 mm. They taper very gradually from the proximal extremity, which is somewhat hastately sharp-pointed and may be as much as 0.004 mm thick, to the distal, which is hair-like and apparently nearly always broken off.
Arturia vansoesti Cóndor-Luján, Louzada, Hajdu & Klautau, 2018		Western Indian Ocean	
