= Tapura magnifolia =

Conservation status
- Near Threatened (IUCN 3.1)

Scientific classification
- Kingdom: Plantae
- Clade: Tracheophytes
- Clade: Angiosperms
- Clade: Eudicots
- Clade: Rosids
- Order: Malpighiales
- Family: Dichapetalaceae
- Genus: Tapura
- Species: T. magnifolia

Binomial name
- Tapura magnifolia Prance

Species of flowering plant

Tapura magnifolia is a species of plant in the Dichapetalaceae family. It is endemic to Ecuador. Its natural habitat is subtropical or tropical moist lowland forests.
