= Tapura orbicularis =

Conservation status
- Vulnerable (IUCN 2.3)

Scientific classification
- Kingdom: Plantae
- Clade: Tracheophytes
- Clade: Angiosperms
- Clade: Eudicots
- Clade: Rosids
- Order: Malpighiales
- Family: Dichapetalaceae
- Genus: Tapura
- Species: T. orbicularis

Binomial name
- Tapura orbicularis Ekman ex Urban

Species of flowering plant

Tapura orbicularis is a species of plant in the Dichapetalaceae family. It is endemic to Cuba. It is threatened by habitat loss.
