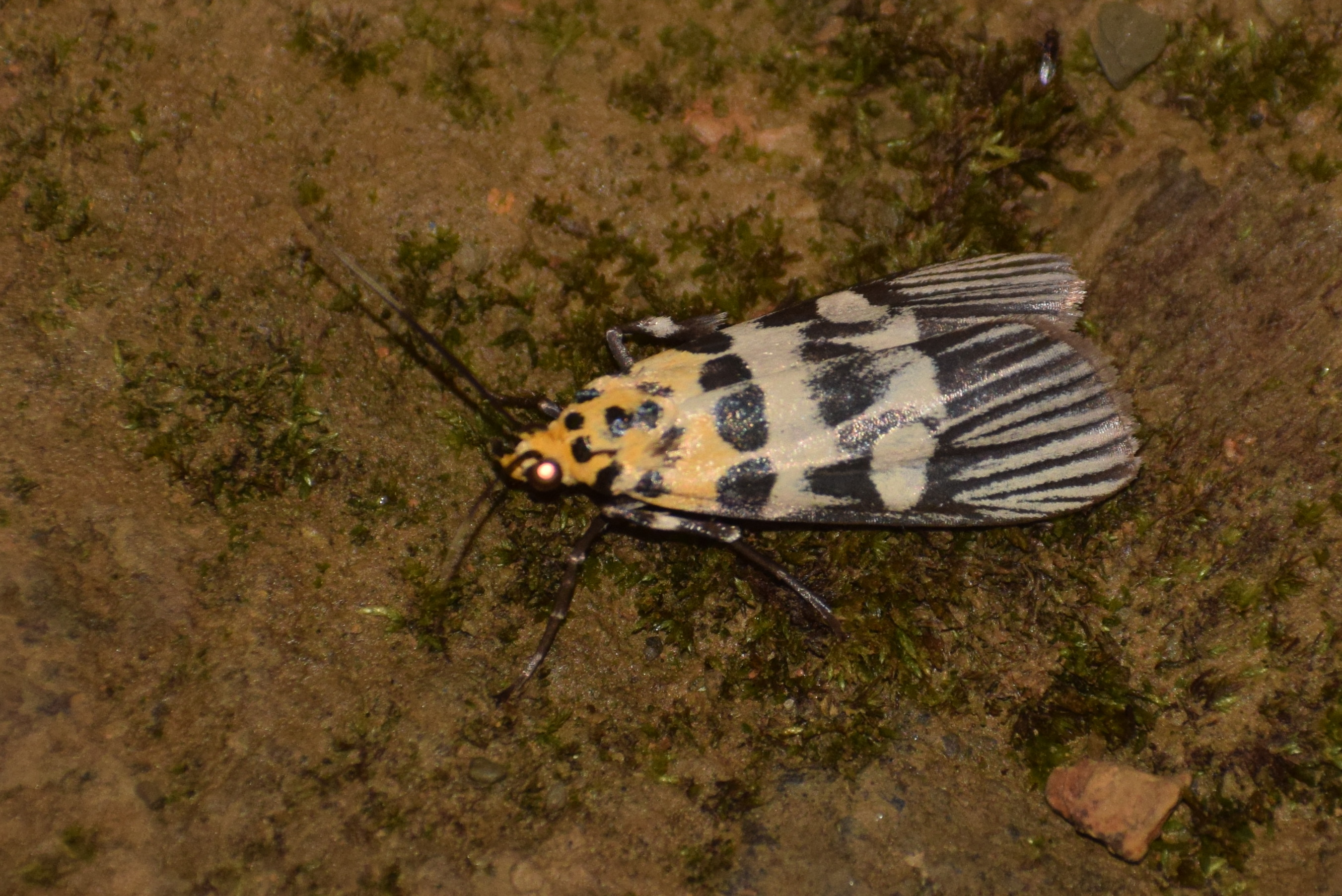

Scientific classification
- Kingdom: Animalia
- Phylum: Arthropoda
- Clade: Pancrustacea
- Class: Insecta
- Order: Lepidoptera
- Family: Pyralidae
- Genus: Vitessa
- Species: V. suradeva

Binomial name
- Vitessa suradeva Moore, 1860

Synonyms
- Vitessa formosa Felder & Rogenhofer, 1875; Vitessa rama Moore, [1885]; Vitessa suradeva suradeva Munroe & Shaffer, 1980; Vitessa suradeva rama Munroe & Shaffer, 1980

= Vitessa suradeva =

Species of moth

Vitessa suradeva is a moth of the family Pyralidae. It is found in India, Bangladesh, Myanmar, Thailand, Vietnam and Sri Lanka.

== Description ==
Its head and thorax are golden yellow. The antennae are black. Abdomen with black and white bands. Base of forewing golden yellow. There are two subbasal metallic black spots on forewing. Hindwings white. The species' larval food plant is Dichapetalum gelonioides.

== Subspecies ==
Two subspecies are recognized.

- Vitessa suradeva suradeva Moore, [1860] - North India, Thailand, Vietnam, Bangladesh, Myanmar
- Vitessa suradeva rama Moore, 1885 - South India, Sri Lanka
