= Tapura neglecta =

Conservation status
- Endangered (IUCN 3.1)

Scientific classification
- Kingdom: Plantae
- Clade: Tracheophytes
- Clade: Angiosperms
- Clade: Eudicots
- Clade: Rosids
- Order: Malpighiales
- Family: Dichapetalaceae
- Genus: Tapura
- Species: T. neglecta

Binomial name
- Tapura neglecta Halle & Heine

Species of flowering plant

Tapura neglecta is a species of plant in the Dichapetalaceae family. It is endemic to Gabon.
