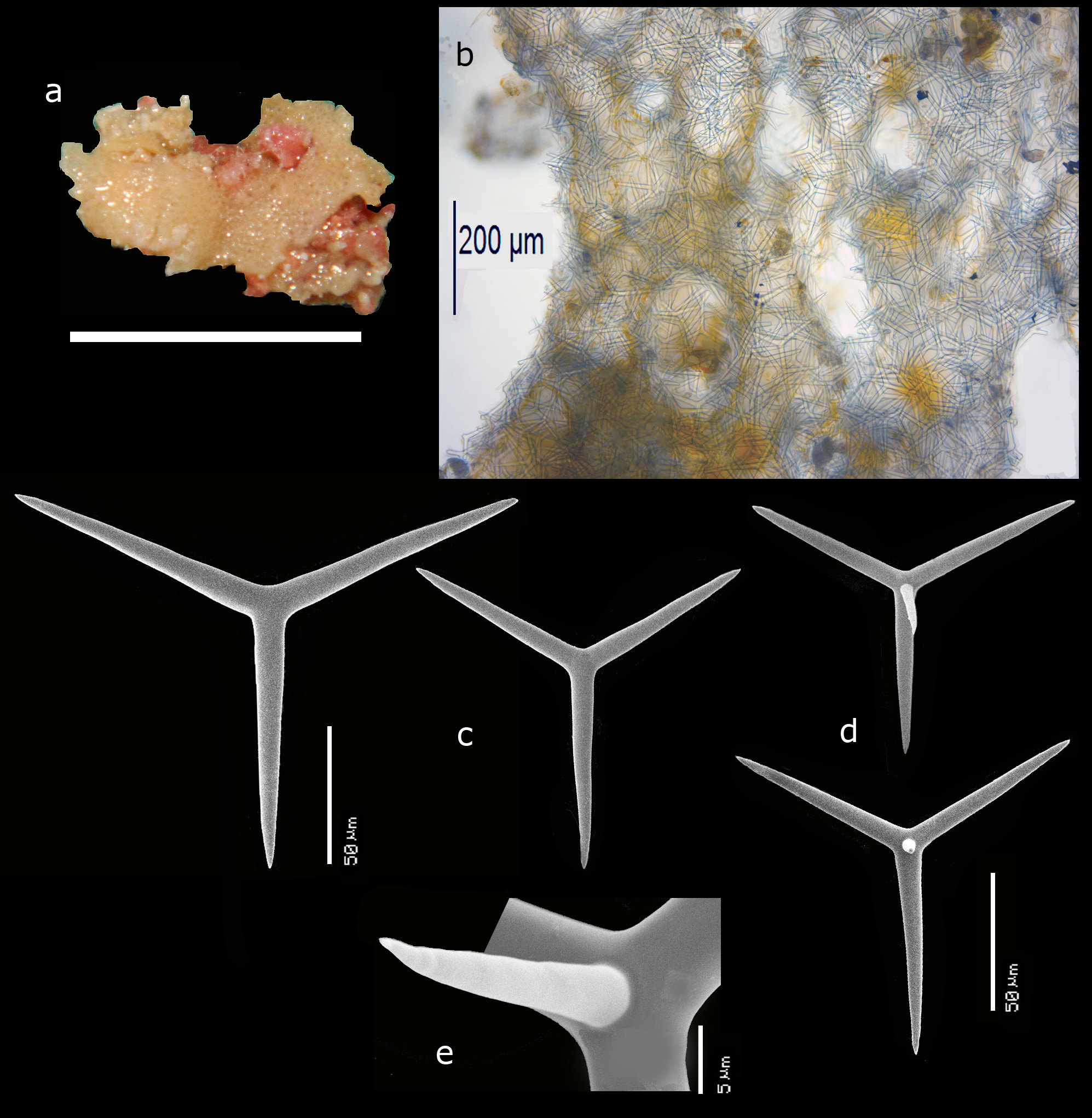

Scientific classification
- Domain: Eukaryota
- Kingdom: Animalia
- Phylum: Porifera
- Class: Calcarea
- Order: Clathrinida
- Family: Clathrinidae
- Genus: Janusya
- Species: J. adusta

Binomial name
- Janusya adusta ( Wörheide & Hooper, 1999)

Synonyms
- Arturia adusta (Wörheide & Hooper, 1999); Arthuria adusta (Wörheide & Hooper, 1999); Clathrina adusta Wörheide and Hooper, 1999; Ernstia adusta (Wörheide and Hooper, 1999)

= Janusya adusta =

Species of sponge

Janusya adusta is a species of sea sponge in the family Clathrinidae found in Australia. The species was first described as Clathrina adusta by Gert Wörheide & John Hooper in 1999, and was assigned to the genus, Arthuria, in 2016 by Oliver Voigt & Wörheide. However, the name Arthuria had already been used (for a mollusc) and hence the genus name was changed to Arturia. It was subsequently moved again to the genus Janusya.
