= Stephanopodium longipedicellatum =

Conservation status
- Endangered (IUCN 3.1)

Scientific classification
- Kingdom: Plantae
- Clade: Tracheophytes
- Clade: Angiosperms
- Clade: Eudicots
- Clade: Rosids
- Order: Malpighiales
- Family: Dichapetalaceae
- Genus: Stephanopodium
- Species: S. longipedicellatum

Binomial name
- Stephanopodium longipedicellatum Prance

Species of flowering plant

Stephanopodium longipedicellatum is a species of plant in the Dichapetalaceae family. It is endemic to Ecuador. Its natural habitat is subtropical or tropical moist montane forests.
