= Tapura fischeri =

Scientific classification
- Kingdom: Plantae
- Clade: Tracheophytes
- Clade: Angiosperms
- Clade: Eudicots
- Clade: Rosids
- Order: Malpighiales
- Family: Dichapetalaceae
- Genus: Tapura
- Species: T. fischeri

Binomial name
- Tapura fischeri Engl.

Species of flowering plant

Tapura fischeri is a understory rainforest tree that grows to 12 m (39 ft) in height. It belongs to the family Dichapetalaceae. Its most interesting characteristic is that the flowers occur in clusters of 1 or 2 dozen between the stalk (petiole) of the leaf and its blade (lamina); a unique location.

The species is found in tropical and southern parts of Africa from Sudan in the north to KwaZulu-Natal in the south.
