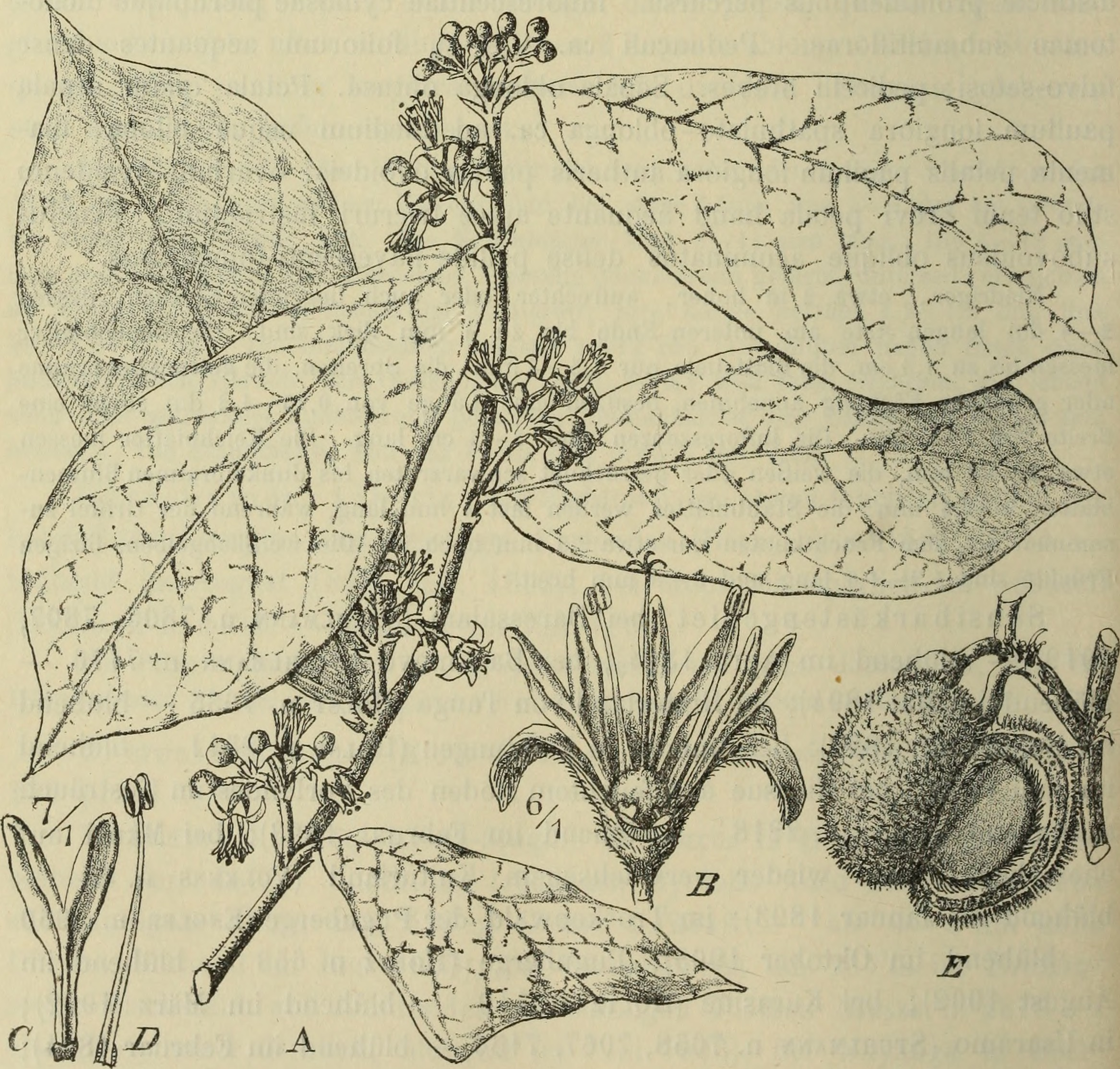
- Dichapetalum pallidum

Scientific classification
- Kingdom: Plantae
- Clade: Tracheophytes
- Clade: Angiosperms
- Clade: Eudicots
- Clade: Rosids
- Order: Malpighiales
- Family: Dichapetalaceae
- Genus: Dichapetalum; Thouars

Type species
- Dichapetalum madagascariense Poir.

= Dichapetalum =

Genus of flowering plants

Dichapetalum is a genus in the plant family Dichapetalaceae. The plants are tropical lianas native mainly to tropical regions of Africa, Asia, Malesia, the West Indies, Australia and Latin America. Some species are known to be poisonous due to the presence of toxic fluorinated compounds, such as fluorooleic acid and fluoroacetic acid and dichapetalins, a unique class of cytotoxic compounds that are only found within this genus.

== Species ==
Accepted by The Plant List, as of February 2014:

- Dichapetalum acuminatum De Wild.
- Dichapetalum affine (Planch. ex Benth.) Breteler
- Dichapetalum alaotrense Desc.
- Dichapetalum albidum A.Chev. ex Pellegr.
- Dichapetalum altescandens Engl.
- Dichapetalum angolense Chodat
- Dichapetalum arachnoideum Breteler
- Dichapetalum arenarium Breteler
- Dichapetalum asplundeanum Prance
- Dichapetalum axillare Woodson
- Dichapetalum bangii (Didr.) Engl.
- Dichapetalum barbatum Breteler
- Dichapetalum barbosae Torre
- Dichapetalum barteri Engl.
- Dichapetalum beckii Fern.Casas
- Dichapetalum beilschmiedioides Breteler
- Dichapetalum bellum Breteler
- Dichapetalum berendinae Breteler
- Dichapetalum bernalii Prance
- Dichapetalum bocageanum (Henr.) Engl.
- Dichapetalum bodyi De Wild.
- Dichapetalum bojeri (Tul.) Engl.
- Dichapetalum braunii Engl. & K.Krause
- Dichapetalum brenesii Standl.
- Dichapetalum bullatum Standl. & Steyerm.
- Dichapetalum chalotii Pellegr.
- Dichapetalum chlorinum (Tul.) Engl.
- Dichapetalum choristilum Engl.
- Dichapetalum coelhoi Prance
- Dichapetalum coelhoorum Prance
- Dichapetalum congoense Engl. & Ruhland
- Dichapetalum crassifolium Chodat
- Dichapetalum cubense (Poepp.) M. Gómez
- Dichapetalum cymosum (Hook.) Engl.
- Dichapetalum cymulosum (Oliv.) Engl.
- Dichapetalum deflexum (Klotzsch) Engl.
- Dichapetalum dewevrei De Wild. & T.Durand
- Dichapetalum dewildei Breteler
- Dichapetalum dictyospermum Breteler
- Dichapetalum donnell-smithii Engl.
- Dichapetalum edule Engl.
- Dichapetalum eickii Ruhland
- Dichapetalum fadenii Breteler
- Dichapetalum filicaule Breteler
- Dichapetalum findouense Breteler
- Dichapetalum foreroi Prance
- Dichapetalum froesii Prance
- Dichapetalum fructuosum Hiern
- Dichapetalum gabonense Engl.
- Dichapetalum gassitae Breteler
- Dichapetalum gelonioides (Roxb.) Engl.
- Dichapetalum geminostellatum Breteler
- Dichapetalum gentryi Prance
- Dichapetalum germainii Hauman
- Dichapetalum gilletii De Wild.
- Dichapetalum glomeratum Engl.
- Dichapetalum grandifolium Ridl.
- Dichapetalum grayumii Prance
- Dichapetalum griffithii (Hook.f.) Engl.
- Dichapetalum hammelii Prance
- Dichapetalum helferianum (Kurz) Pierre
- Dichapetalum heudelotii (Planch. ex Oliv.) Baill.
- Dichapetalum inaequale Breteler
- Dichapetalum inopinatum Al.Rodr. & Kriebel
- Dichapetalum insigne Engl.
- Dichapetalum integripetalum Engl.
- Dichapetalum klaineanum Brette
- Dichapetalum korupinum Breteler
- Dichapetalum latifolium Baill.
- Dichapetalum laurocerasus (Hook.f.) Engl.
- Dichapetalum letouzeyi Breteler
- Dichapetalum leucocarpum Breteler
- Dichapetalum leucosia (Spreng.) Engl.
- Dichapetalum librevillense Pellegr.
- Dichapetalum lindicum Breteler
- Dichapetalum lofense Breteler
- Dichapetalum longipetalum (Turcz.) Engl.
- Dichapetalum lujae De Wild. & T.Durand
- Dichapetalum macrocarpum Engl.
- Dichapetalum madagascariense Poir.
- Dichapetalum mathisii Breteler
- Dichapetalum melanocladum Breteler
- Dichapetalum mexicanum Prance
- Dichapetalum minutiflorum Engl. & Ruhland
- Dichapetalum mombuttense Engl.
- Dichapetalum montanum Breteler
- Dichapetalum moralesii Prance
- Dichapetalum morenoi Prance
- Dichapetalum mossambicense (Klotzsch) Engl.
- Dichapetalum mundense Engl.
- Dichapetalum neglectum Breteler
- Dichapetalum nervatum Cuatrec.
- Dichapetalum nevermannianum Standl. & Valerio
- Dichapetalum nyangense Pellegr.
- Dichapetalum obanense (Baker f.) Hutch. & Dalziel
- Dichapetalum oblongum (Hook.f. ex Benth.) Engl.
- Dichapetalum odoratum Baill.
- Dichapetalum oliganthum Breteler
- Dichapetalum pallidum (Oliv.) Engl.
- Dichapetalum papuanum (Becc.) Boerl. – Qld Australia, New Guinea, Solomon Is., Moluccas
- Dichapetalum parvifolium Engl.
- Dichapetalum pauper Rizzini
- Dichapetalum pedicellatum K.Krause
- Dichapetalum pedunculatum (DC.) Baill.
- Dichapetalum petaloideum Breteler
- Dichapetalum pierrei Pellegr.
- Dichapetalum platyphyllum Merr.
- Dichapetalum potamophilum Breteler
- Dichapetalum prancei Fern.Casas
- Dichapetalum pulchrum Breteler
- Dichapetalum rabiense Breteler
- Dichapetalum reliquum Kriebel & Al.Rodr.
- Dichapetalum reticulatum Engl.
- Dichapetalum rhodesicum Sprague & Hutch.
- Dichapetalum rudatisii Engl.
- Dichapetalum ruficeps Breteler
- Dichapetalum rufum (Tul.) Engl.
- Dichapetalum rugosum (Vahl) Prance
- Dichapetalum ruhlandii Engl.
- Dichapetalum schulzii Prance
- Dichapetalum scorpioideum Leenh.
- Dichapetalum sessiliflorum Leenh.
- Dichapetalum setosum Leenh.
- Dichapetalum sordidum (Hook.f.) Leenh.
- Dichapetalum spruceanum Baill.
- Dichapetalum staminellatum Breteler
- Dichapetalum staudtii Engl.
- Dichapetalum steenisii Leenh.
- Dichapetalum steyermarkii Prance
- Dichapetalum stipulatum J.F.Macbr.
- Dichapetalum stuhlmannii Engl.
- Dichapetalum sumbense Breteler
- Dichapetalum tenerum Leenh.
- Dichapetalum tenuifolium (King) Engl.
- Dichapetalum tetrastachyum Breteler
- Dichapetalum thollonii Pellegr.
- Dichapetalum timorense (DC.) Boerl. – SE Asia, Malesia, Qld Australia
- Dichapetalum tomentosum Engl.
- Dichapetalum toxicarium (G.Don) Baill.
- Dichapetalum tricapsulare (Blanco) Merr.
- Dichapetalum trichocephalum Breteler
- Dichapetalum ugandense M.B.Moss
- Dichapetalum umbellatum Chodat
- Dichapetalum unguiculatum Engl.
- Dichapetalum virchowii (O.Hoffm. & Hildebr.) Engl.
- Dichapetalum vitiense (Seem.) Engl.
- Dichapetalum vondrozanum Desc.
- Dichapetalum witianum Breteler
- Dichapetalum zenkeri Engl.
- Dichapetalum zeylanicum Kosterm.
