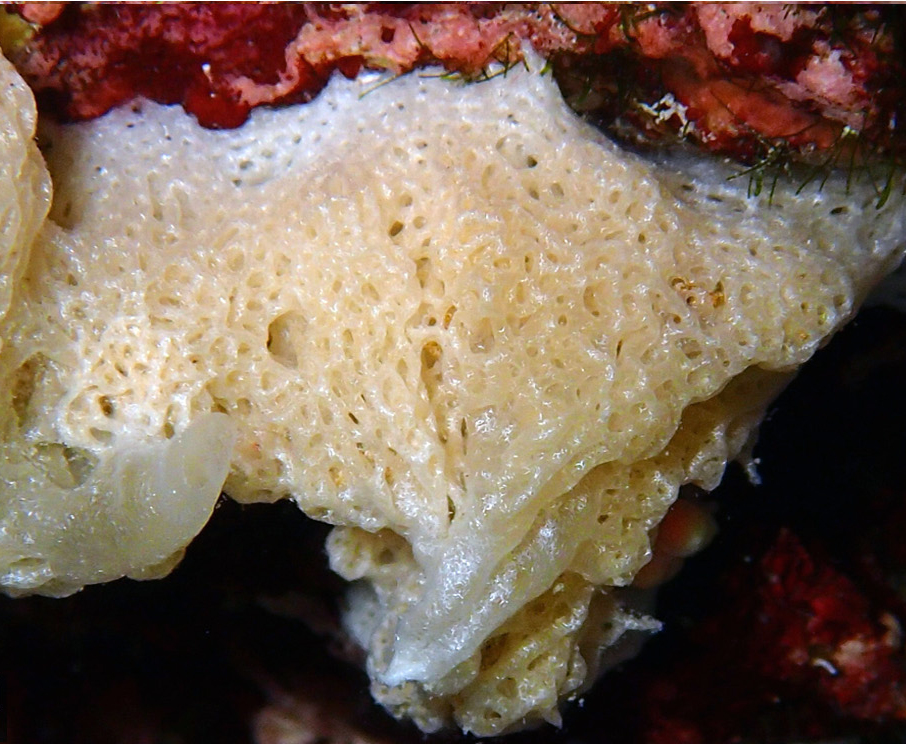

Scientific classification
- Kingdom: Animalia
- Phylum: Porifera
- Class: Calcarea
- Order: Clathrinida
- Family: Clathrinidae
- Genus: Arturia
- Species: A. sueziana

Binomial name
- Arturia sueziana (Klautau & Valentine, 2003)

Synonyms
- Clathrina sueziana Klautau & Valentine, 2003

= Arturia sueziana =

Species of sponge

Arturia sueziana is a species of calcareous sponge from Egypt. The species is named after the Egyptian city of Suez where the holotype was discovered.

== Description ==
Cormus of the holotype formed of thin, irregular and loosely anastomosed tubes. A large tube functioning as an osculum is physically connected to thinner water-connecting tubes, receiving the excurrent water from them. The skeleton has no special organization, comprising equiangular and equiradiate triactines and tetractines in roughly the same proportions. They are similar in size. Their actines are cylindrical or conical, with a blunt tip. Some of them are larger in the middle. The apical actine of the tetractines has almost the same diameter at the base as the facial actines. It is conical, shorter, straight, smooth and sharp. Trichoxeas are also present but there are very few.
