= Arturia hirsuta =

Scientific classification
- Kingdom: Animalia
- Phylum: Porifera
- Class: Calcarea
- Order: Clathrinida
- Family: Clathrinidae
- Genus: Arturia
- Species: A. hirsuta

Binomial name
- Arturia hirsuta (Klautau & Valentine, 2003)

Synonyms
- Clathrina hirsuta Klautau & Valentine, 2003

Species of sponge

Arturia hirsuta is a species of calcareous sponge from South Africa. The name refers to the hispid surface of the sponge.

== Description ==
Cormus composed of large, irregular and loosely anastomosed tubes. Water-collecting tubes converge to form conical projections with an osculum. The surface of the tubes is hispid because of the presence of diactines and trichoxea. Cells with granules have not been observed. The skeleton comprises equiangular and equiradiate triactines and very few tetractines. Actines are conical and straight, with a sharp tip. Diactines and fusiform and slightly curved. They are projected towards the exterior of the tubes. Trichoxeas are also present, perpendicular to the surface of the tubes.
