= Catopsis wawranea =

Scientific classification
- Kingdom: Plantae
- Clade: Embryophytes
- Clade: Tracheophytes
- Clade: Spermatophytes
- Clade: Angiosperms
- Clade: Monocots
- Clade: Commelinids
- Order: Poales
- Family: Bromeliaceae
- Genus: Catopsis
- Species: C. wawranea

Binomial name
- Catopsis wawranea Mez

Species of flowering plant

Catopsis wawranea is a species of flowering plant in the family Bromeliaceae. This species is native to Costa Rica, Belize, and Mexico (Veracruz, Oaxaca).
