= Chrysomyza =

Scientific classification
- Domain: Eukaryota
- Kingdom: Animalia
- Phylum: Arthropoda
- Class: Insecta
- Order: Diptera
- Family: Ulidiidae
- Genus: Chrysomyza; Zetterstedt, 1859

Genus of flies

Chrysomyza is a genus of ulidiid or picture-winged fly in the family Ulidiidae.

== Species ==
- Chrysomyza africana
- Chrysomyza allomma
- Chrysomyza anaglypha
- Chrysomyza azurea
- Chrysomyza chalybea
- Chrysomyza flavipes
- Chrysomyza longicornis
- Chrysomyza obscura
- Chrysomyza sericea
- Chrysomyza tarsata
- Chrysomyza violacea
