= Catopsis minimiflora =

Scientific classification
- Kingdom: Plantae
- Clade: Tracheophytes
- Clade: Angiosperms
- Clade: Monocots
- Clade: Commelinids
- Order: Poales
- Family: Bromeliaceae
- Genus: Catopsis
- Species: C. minimiflora

Binomial name
- Catopsis minimiflora Matuda

Synonyms
- Tillandsia patriae Rauh; Tillandsia patriae var. laxiflora Rauh

Species of flowering plant

Catopsis minimiflora is a species in the genus Catopsis. This species is endemic to the State of Chiapas in southern Mexico.
