= Chrysomyza violacea =

Scientific classification
- Kingdom: Animalia
- Phylum: Arthropoda
- Class: Insecta
- Order: Diptera
- Family: Ulidiidae
- Genus: Chrysomyza
- Species: C. violacea

Binomial name
- Chrysomyza violacea Hendel, 1910

Species of fly

Chrysomyza violacea is a species of ulidiid or picture-winged fly in the genus Chrysomyza of the family Ulidiidae.
