= Chrysomyza sericea =

Scientific classification
- Kingdom: Animalia
- Phylum: Arthropoda
- Class: Insecta
- Order: Diptera
- Family: Ulidiidae
- Genus: Chrysomyza
- Species: C. sericea

Binomial name
- Chrysomyza sericea Hendel, 1913

Species of fly

Chrysomyza sericea is a species of ulidiid or picture-winged fly in the genus Chrysomyza of the family Tephritidae.
