= Arturia dubia =

Scientific classification
- Domain: Eukaryota
- Kingdom: Animalia
- Phylum: Porifera
- Class: Calcarea
- Order: Clathrinida
- Family: Clathrinidae
- Genus: Arturia
- Species: A. dubia

Binomial name
- Arturia dubia (Dendy, 1891)

Synonyms
- Clathrina dubia (Dendy, 1891); Leucosolenia dubia Dendy, 1891

Species of sponge

Lectotype site (inside Port Phillip Heads)'"`UNIQ--ref-00000006-QINU`"'

Arturia dubia is a species of calcareous sponge in the genus Arturia from Australia. The species was first described as Leucosolenia dubia by Arthur Dendy in 1891. The name is derived from Dendy's uncertainty about the validity of the species, believing his specimens could, in fact, represent juvenile Leucosolenia cavata (now Ascaltis cavata).

== Description ==
Cormus formed of irregular and loosely anastomosed tubes. There is no cortex but sometimes it appears that some of the tubes could be forming one. The wall of the tubes is thick, up to 100 μm. In some areas the tubes are hispid.

Cells with yellow granules are present in the mesohyl, as are embryos, which are always found near choanocytes. The cells with yellow granules are distributed homogeneously, throughout the mesohyl.

The skeleton consists of equiangular and equiradiate triactines. Tetractines are also present, but they are rare. Actines are conical or cylindrical, but they always have sharp tips. Sometimes, they are slightly undulated. Diactines are abundant on the external tubes; they are curved or straight, vary in size and have sharp tips, one of which is club-shaped. The largest diactines are curved at the tip. They project through the surface in some parts of the cormus only, and the club-shaped portion of the spicule lies inside the tube.
