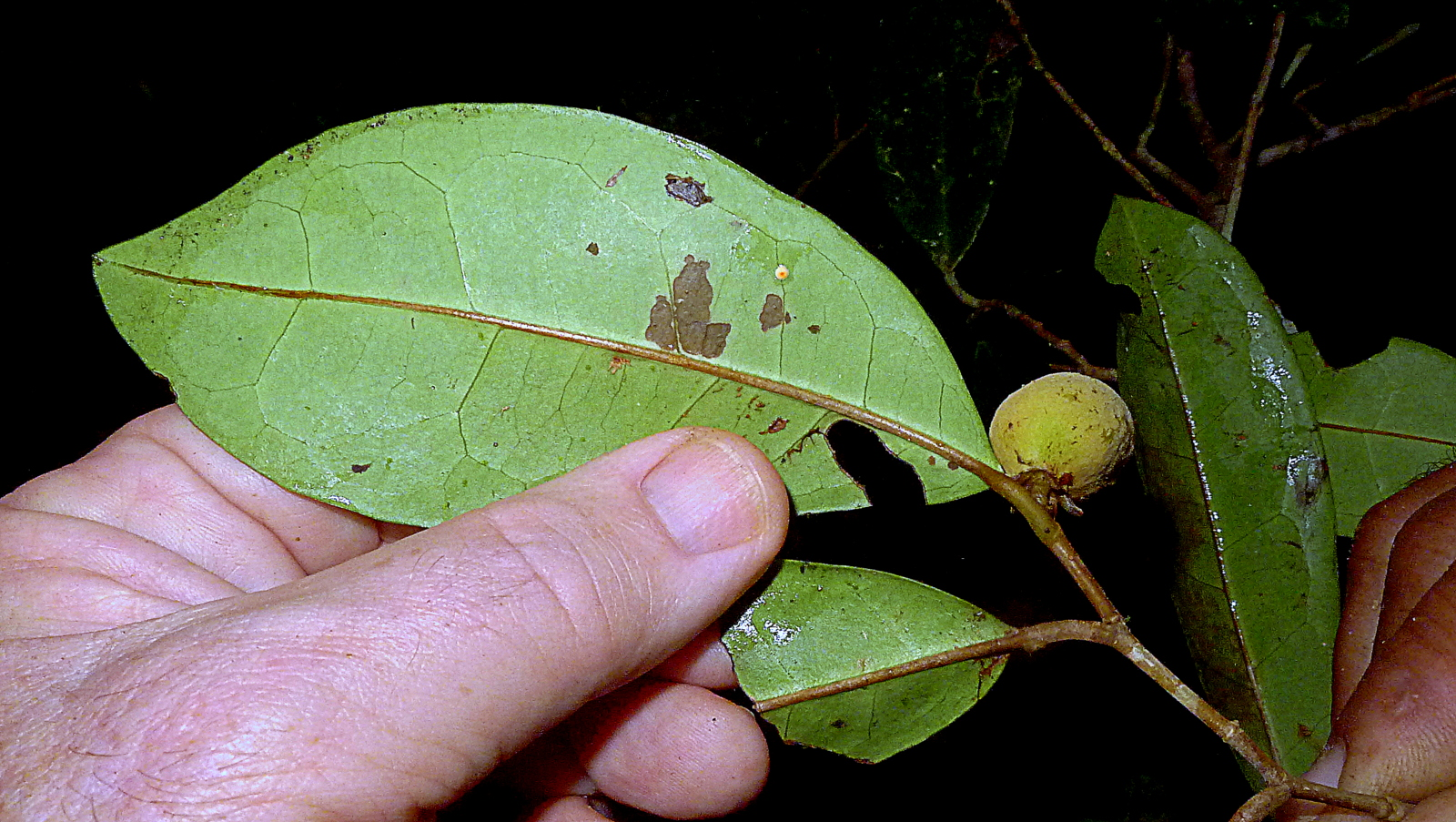
- Stephanopodium blanchetianum

Scientific classification
- Kingdom: Plantae
- Clade: Tracheophytes
- Clade: Angiosperms
- Clade: Eudicots
- Clade: Rosids
- Order: Malpighiales
- Family: Dichapetalaceae
- Genus: Stephanopodium; Poepp.

= Stephanopodium =

Genus of plants

Stephanopodium is a genus of flowering plants native to the Americas in the family Dichapetalaceae.

The genus has 14 species including:

- Stephanopodium longipedicellatum Prance
- Stephanopodium magnifolium Prance
