= Arturia compacta =

Scientific classification
- Domain: Eukaryota
- Kingdom: Animalia
- Phylum: Porifera
- Class: Calcarea
- Order: Clathrinida
- Family: Clathrinidae
- Genus: Arturia
- Species: A. compacta

Binomial name
- Arturia compacta (Schuffner, 1877)

Synonyms
- Ascaltis compacta Schuffner, 1877; Clathrina compacta (Schuffner, 1877)

Species of sponge

Arturia compacta is a species of calcareous sponge in the family Clathrinidae found in Mauritius. This species is very likely to be synonymous with Arthuria canariensis, differing only in its larger and thicker triactines. However, the type and only known specimen is lost.
