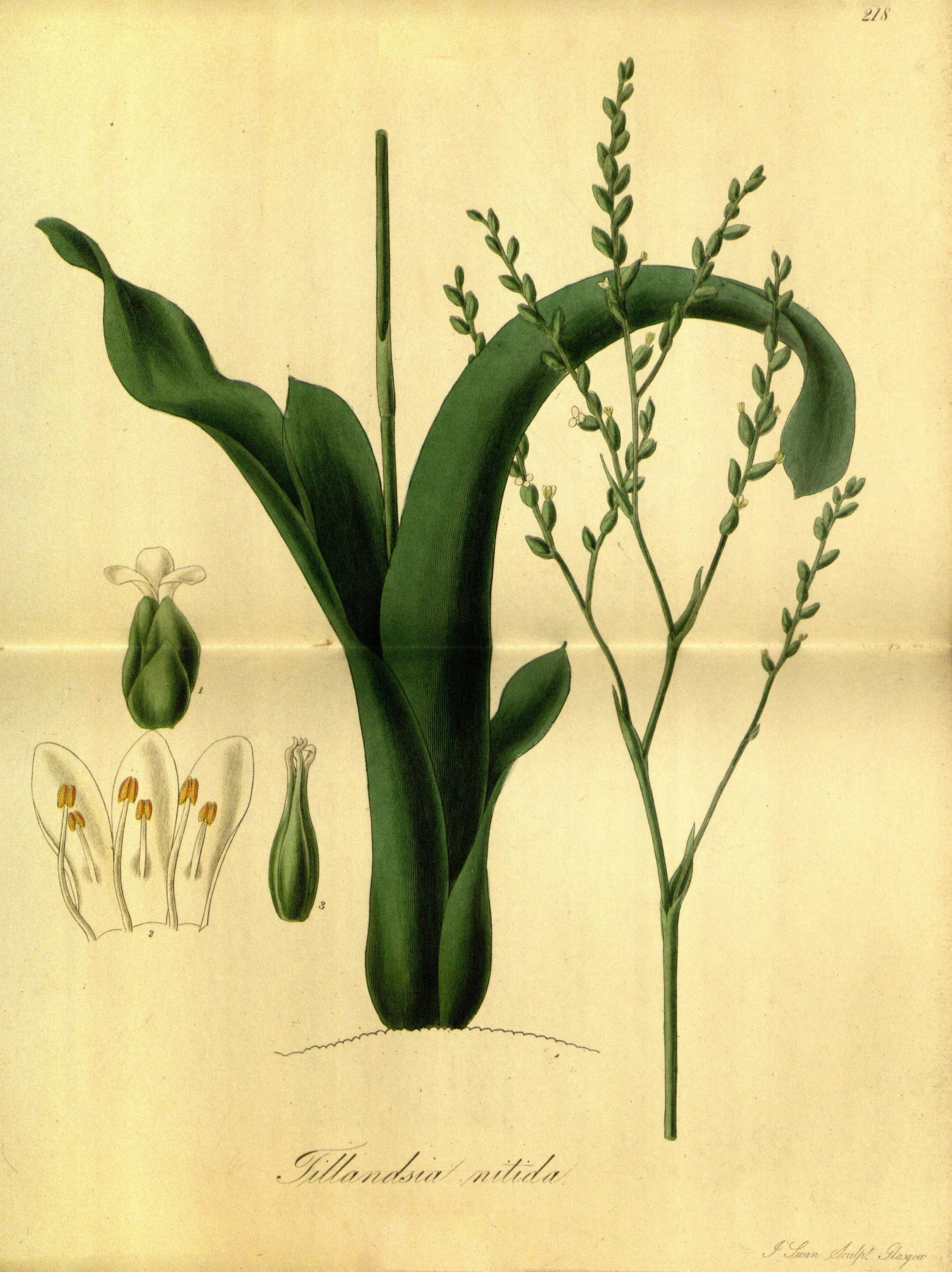

Scientific classification
- Kingdom: Plantae
- Clade: Tracheophytes
- Clade: Angiosperms
- Clade: Monocots
- Clade: Commelinids
- Order: Poales
- Family: Bromeliaceae
- Genus: Catopsis
- Species: C. nitida

Binomial name
- Catopsis nitida (Hooker) Grisebach

Synonyms
- Tillandsia nitida Hook.; Tussacia nitida (Hook.) Beer; Pogospermum nitidum (Hook.) Brongn.; Pogospermum inconspicuum Brongn.; Catopsis inconspicua (Brongn.) Baker

= Catopsis nitida =

Species of flowering plant

Catopsis nitida is a species in the genus Catopsis. This species is native to southern Mexico (Veracruz, Oaxaca, Chiapas), Central America, Cuba, Hispaniola, Jamaica and Puerto Rico.
