= Catopsis nutans =

Scientific classification
- Kingdom: Plantae
- Clade: Tracheophytes
- Clade: Angiosperms
- Clade: Monocots
- Clade: Commelinids
- Order: Poales
- Family: Bromeliaceae
- Genus: Catopsis
- Species: C. nutans

Binomial name
- Catopsis nutans (Swartz) Grisebach

Synonyms
- Tillandsia nutans Sw.; Pogospermum nutans (Sw.) Brongn.; Tillandsia vitellina Klotzsch; Tussacia vitellina (Klotzsch) Beer; Catopsis fulgens Griseb.; Pogospermum flavum Brongn.; Catopsis stenopetala Baker; Catopsis vitellina (Klotzsch) Baker; Tillandsia cornucopia Bertero ex André; Catopsis tenella Mez

Species of flowering plant

Catopsis nutans is a species belonging to the genus Catopsis. This species is native to Florida, Central America, Greater Antilles (Cuba, Hispaniola, Jamaica), Venezuela, Colombia, Bolivia, and Ecuador.
