= Chrysomyza anaglypha =

Scientific classification
- Kingdom: Animalia
- Phylum: Arthropoda
- Clade: Pancrustacea
- Class: Insecta
- Order: Diptera
- Family: Ulidiidae
- Genus: Chrysomyza
- Species: C. anaglypha

Binomial name
- Chrysomyza anaglypha Séguy, 1941

Species of fly

Chrysomyza anaglypha is a species of ulidiid or picture-winged fly in the genus Chrysomyza of the family Ulidiidae.
