= Arturia alcatraziensis =

Scientific classification
- Kingdom: Animalia
- Phylum: Porifera
- Class: Calcarea
- Order: Clathrinida
- Family: Clathrinidae
- Genus: Arturia
- Species: A. alcatraziensis

Binomial name
- Arturia alcatraziensis (Lanna, Rossi, Cavalcanti, Hajdu & Klautau, 2007)

Synonyms
- Clathrina alcatraziensis Lanna, Rossi, Cavalcanti, Hajdu & Klautau, 2007

Species of sponge

Arturia alcatraziensis is a species of calcareous sponge from Brazil. It is named after the Alcatrazes Islands where it was discovered.
