= Catopsis werckleana =

Scientific classification
- Kingdom: Plantae
- Clade: Embryophytes
- Clade: Tracheophytes
- Clade: Spermatophytes
- Clade: Angiosperms
- Clade: Monocots
- Clade: Commelinids
- Order: Poales
- Family: Bromeliaceae
- Genus: Catopsis
- Species: C. werckleana

Binomial name
- Catopsis werckleana Mez

Species of flowering plant

Catopsis werckleana is a species of flowering plant in the family Bromeliaceae. This species is native to Costa Rica.
