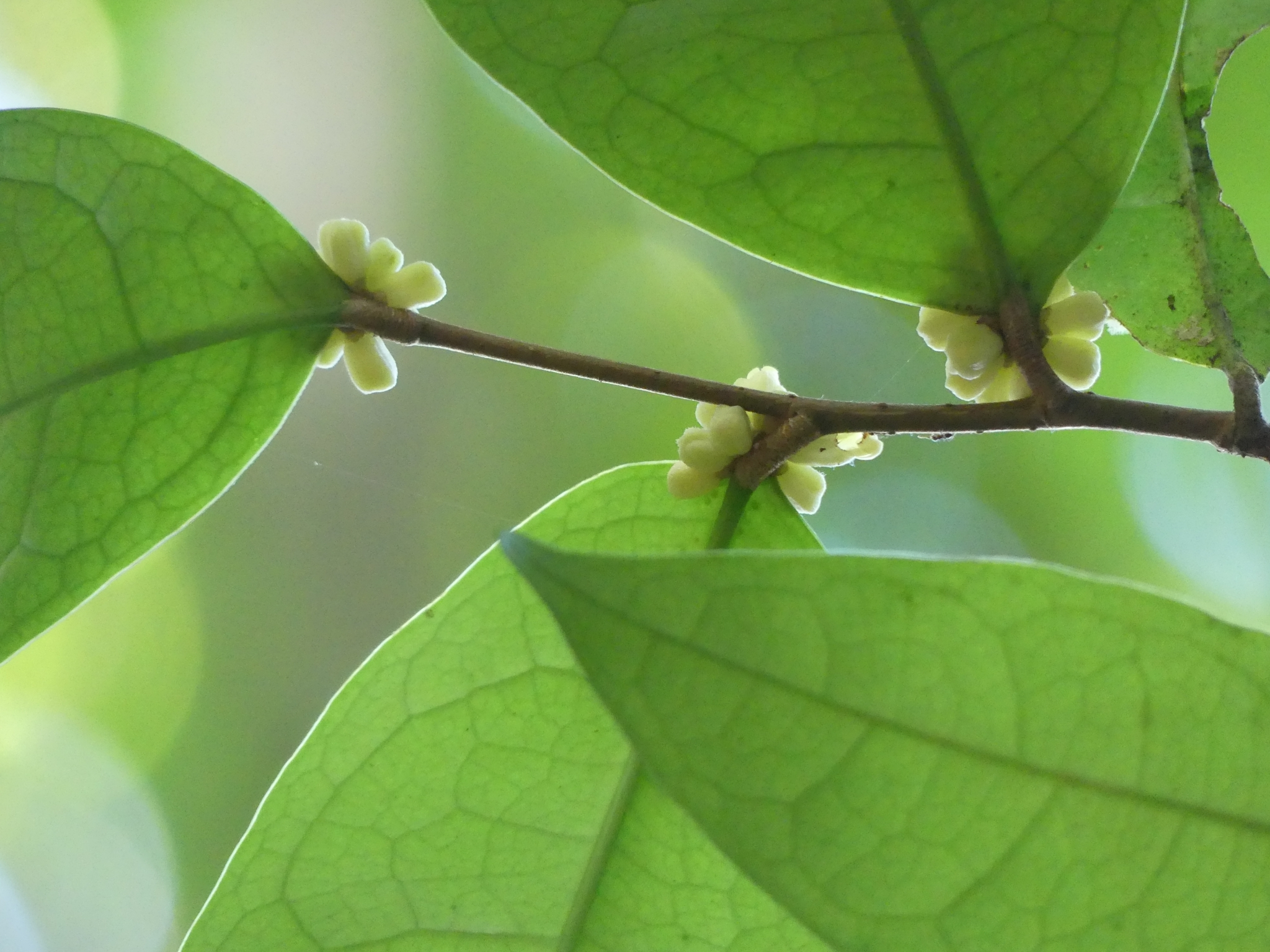
- Tapura guianensis in French Guiana

Scientific classification
- Kingdom: Plantae
- Clade: Tracheophytes
- Clade: Angiosperms
- Clade: Eudicots
- Clade: Rosids
- Order: Malpighiales
- Family: Dichapetalaceae
- Genus: Tapura; Aubl.

Synonyms
- Dischizolaena (Baill.) Tiegh.; Gonypetalum Ule; Rohria Schreb.

= Tapura =

Genus of plants

Tapura is a genus of flowering plants in the family Dichapetalaceae. Species in this genus are native to Central and South America, and Africa.

As of June 2024, Plants of the World Online accepted the following species:

- Tapura acreana (Ule) Rizzini
- Tapura africana Oliv.
- Tapura amazonica Poepp.
- Tapura arachnoidea Breteler
- Tapura bouquetiana N.Hallé & Heine
- Tapura bullata Standl.
- Tapura capitulifera Baill.
- Tapura carinata Breteler
- Tapura colombiana Cuatrec.
- Tapura coriacea J.F.Macbr.
- Tapura costata Cuatrec.
- Tapura cubensis (Poepp.) Griseb.
- Tapura ferreyrae Prance
- Tapura fischeri Engl.
- Tapura follii Prance
- Tapura guianensis Aubl.
- Tapura haitiensis Urb. & Ekman
- Tapura ivorensis Breteler
- Tapura juliani J.F.Macbr.
- Tapura juruana (Ule) Rizzini
- Tapura lanceolata (Ducke) Rizzini
- Tapura latifolia Benth.
- Tapura letestui Pellegr.
- Tapura lujae De Wild.
- Tapura magnifolia Prance
- Tapura martiniae Amorim & D.S.Lisboa
- Tapura mexicana Prance
- Tapura neglecta N.Hallé & Heine
- Tapura orbicularis Ekman ex Urb.
- Tapura panamensis Prance
- Tapura peruviana K.Krause
- Tapura singularis Ducke
- Tapura tchoutoi Breteler
- Tapura tessmannii (K.Krause) Prance
- Tapura wurdackiana Prance
- Tapura zei-limae Amorim & Fiaschi
