= Arturia passionensis =

Scientific classification
- Domain: Eukaryota
- Kingdom: Animalia
- Phylum: Porifera
- Class: Calcarea
- Order: Clathrinida
- Family: Clathrinidae
- Genus: Arturia
- Species: A. passionensis

Binomial name
- Arturia passionensis (van Soest, Kaiser & Van Syoc, 2011)

Species of sponge

Arturia passionensis is a species of calcareous sponge from Clipperton Island.
