= Catopsis delicatula =

Scientific classification
- Kingdom: Plantae
- Clade: Tracheophytes
- Clade: Angiosperms
- Clade: Monocots
- Clade: Commelinids
- Order: Poales
- Family: Bromeliaceae
- Genus: Catopsis
- Species: C. delicatula

Binomial name
- Catopsis delicatula L.B. Smith

Species of flowering plant

Catopsis delicatula is a species in the genus Catopsis. This species is native to Mexico and Guatemala.
