= Dichapetalum madagascariense =

Scientific classification
- Kingdom: Plantae
- Clade: Tracheophytes
- Clade: Angiosperms
- Clade: Eudicots
- Clade: Rosids
- Order: Malpighiales
- Family: Dichapetalaceae
- Genus: Dichapetalum
- Species: D. madagascariense

Binomial name
- Dichapetalum madagascariense Poir.

Synonyms
- Ceanothus guineensis DC.; Chailletia dichapetalum DC.; Chailletia dichapetalum f. macrophylla Tul.; Chailletia dichapetalum f. multiflora Tul.; Chailletia floribunda Planch.; Chailletia sarmentosa B. Boivin; Chailletia subcordata Hook.f. ex Benth.; Chailletia thomsonii Oliv.; Dichapetalum aruwimense Engl.; Dichapetalum bakerianum Exell; Dichapetalum beniense Engl.; Dichapetalum dundusanense De Wild.; Dichapetalum flabellatiflorum Hauman; Dichapetalum flaviflorum Engl.; Dichapetalum floribundum (Planch.) Engl.; Dichapetalum floribundum var. preussii Engl.; Dichapetalum glandulosum De Wild.; Dichapetalum gossweileri Engl.; Dichapetalum guineense (DC.) Keay; Dichapetalum madagascariense var. beniense (Engl.) Breteler; Dichapetalum multiflorum (Tul.) Desc.; Dichapetalum pynaertii De Wild.; Dichapetalum rowlandii Hutch. & Dalziel; Dichapetalum subcordatum (Hook.f. ex Benth.) Engl.; Dichapetalum subcoriaceum Engl.; Dichapetalum thomsonii (Oliv.) Engl.; Dichapetalum thouarsianum var. macrophyllum (Tul.) Desc.; Dichapetalum thouarsianum var. pubescens Desc.; Dichapetalum ubangiense De Wild.; Rhamnus paniculatus Thonn.

Species of flowering plant

Dichapetalum madagascariense is a plant species originally described from Madagascar but now reported from many parts of mainland tropical Africa as well. It is reported from a wide region from Mozambique north to Tanzania and west to Liberia.

Dichapetalum madagascariense is a liana climbing over other vegetation.
