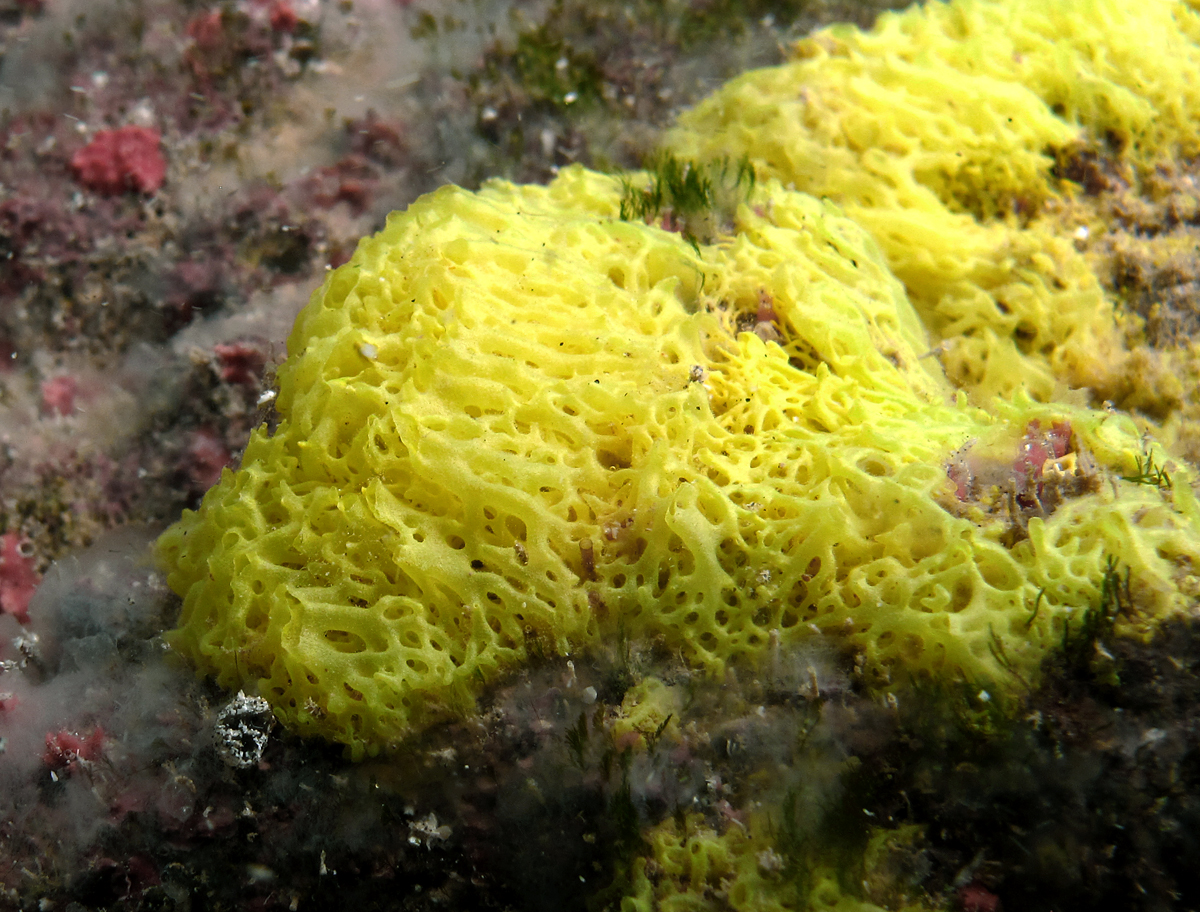

Scientific classification
- Kingdom: Animalia
- Phylum: Porifera
- Class: Calcarea
- Order: Clathrinida
- Family: Clathrinidae
- Genus: Janusya
- Species: J. darwinii

Binomial name
- Janusya darwinii (Haeckel, 1870)

Synonyms
- List: Arthuria darwinii; Arturia darwinii (Haeckel, 1870); Ascaltis caroli Haeckel, 1872; Ascaltis erasmi Haeckel, 1872; Clathrina darwinii (Haeckel, 1870); Leucosolenia darwini Haeckel, 1870; Leucosolenia darwinii Haeckel, 1870

= Janusya darwinii =

Species of sponge

Janusya darwinii is a species of calcareous sponge in the family Clathrinidae found on the Sunda Shelf. The species is named after the English naturalist Charles Darwin.
