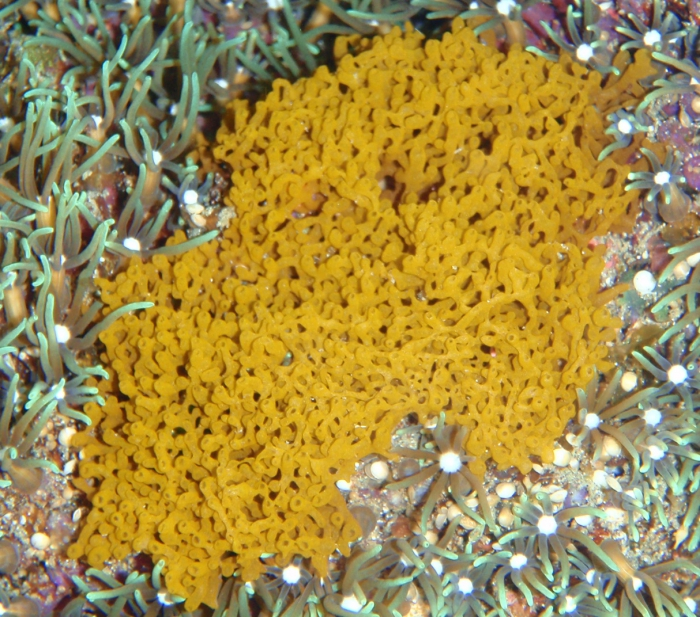
- Janusya tubuloreticulosa

Scientific classification
- Kingdom: Animalia
- Phylum: Porifera
- Class: Calcarea
- Order: Clathrinida
- Family: Clathrinidae
- Genus: Janusya; Klautau, Lopes, Tavares & Pérez, 2021

= Janusya =

Genus of sponges

Janusya is a genus of calcareous sponge in the family Clathrinidae which contains six species. It was first described in 2021.

== Species ==
There are six species in Janusya.

Name	Image	Distribution	Description
Janusya adusta (Wörheide & Hooper, 1999)		Great Barrier Reef in Australia	
Janusya angusta (Van Soest & De Voogd, 2015)		Sulawesi	
Janusya darwinii (Haeckel, 1870)		Western Indian Ocean	
Janusya indica Klautau, Lopes, Tavares & Pérez, 2021		Réunion	
Janusya trindadensis (Azevedo, Padua, Moraes, Rossi, Muricy & Klautau, 2017)		Brazil	
Janusya tubuloreticulosa (Van Soest & De Voogd, 2015)		Indonesia	
