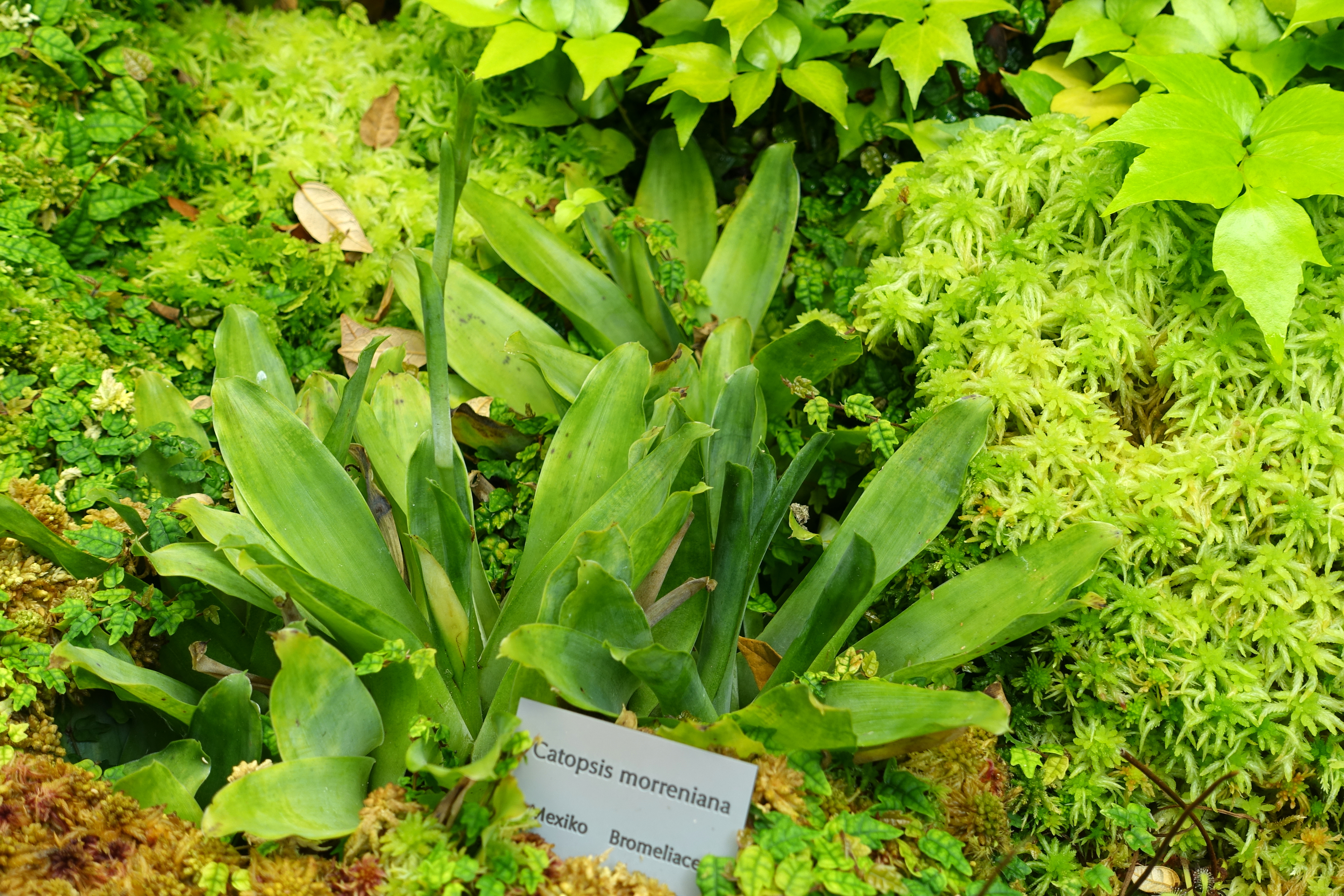

Scientific classification
- Kingdom: Plantae
- Clade: Embryophytes
- Clade: Tracheophytes
- Clade: Spermatophytes
- Clade: Angiosperms
- Clade: Monocots
- Clade: Commelinids
- Order: Poales
- Family: Bromeliaceae
- Genus: Catopsis
- Species: C. morreniana

Binomial name
- Catopsis morreniana Mez

Synonyms
- Heterotypic Synonyms: Catopsis bakeri Mez; Catopsis brevifolia Mez & Wercklé

= Catopsis morreniana =

Species of flowering plant

Catopsis morreniana is a species of flowering plant in the family Bromeliaceae. This species is native to Central America and southern Mexico.
