= Chrysomyza tarsata =

Scientific classification
- Kingdom: Animalia
- Phylum: Arthropoda
- Class: Insecta
- Order: Diptera
- Family: Ulidiidae
- Genus: Chrysomyza
- Species: C. tarsata

Binomial name
- Chrysomyza tarsata (Macquart, 1851)

Species of fly

Chrysomyza tarsata is a species of ulidiid or picture-winged fly in the genus Chrysomyza of the family Ulidiidae.
