= Catopsis wangerinii =

Scientific classification
- Kingdom: Plantae
- Clade: Embryophytes
- Clade: Tracheophytes
- Clade: Spermatophytes
- Clade: Angiosperms
- Clade: Monocots
- Clade: Commelinids
- Order: Poales
- Family: Bromeliaceae
- Genus: Catopsis
- Species: C. wangerinii

Binomial name
- Catopsis wangerinii Mez & Wercklé

Synonyms
- Heterotypic Synonyms: Catopsis cucullata L.B.Sm.; Catopsis pusilla Mez & Wercklé; Catopsis triticea L.B.Sm.

Species of flowering plant

Catopsis wangerinii is a species of flowering plant in the family Catopsis. This species is native to Central America, Colombia, and Mexico.
