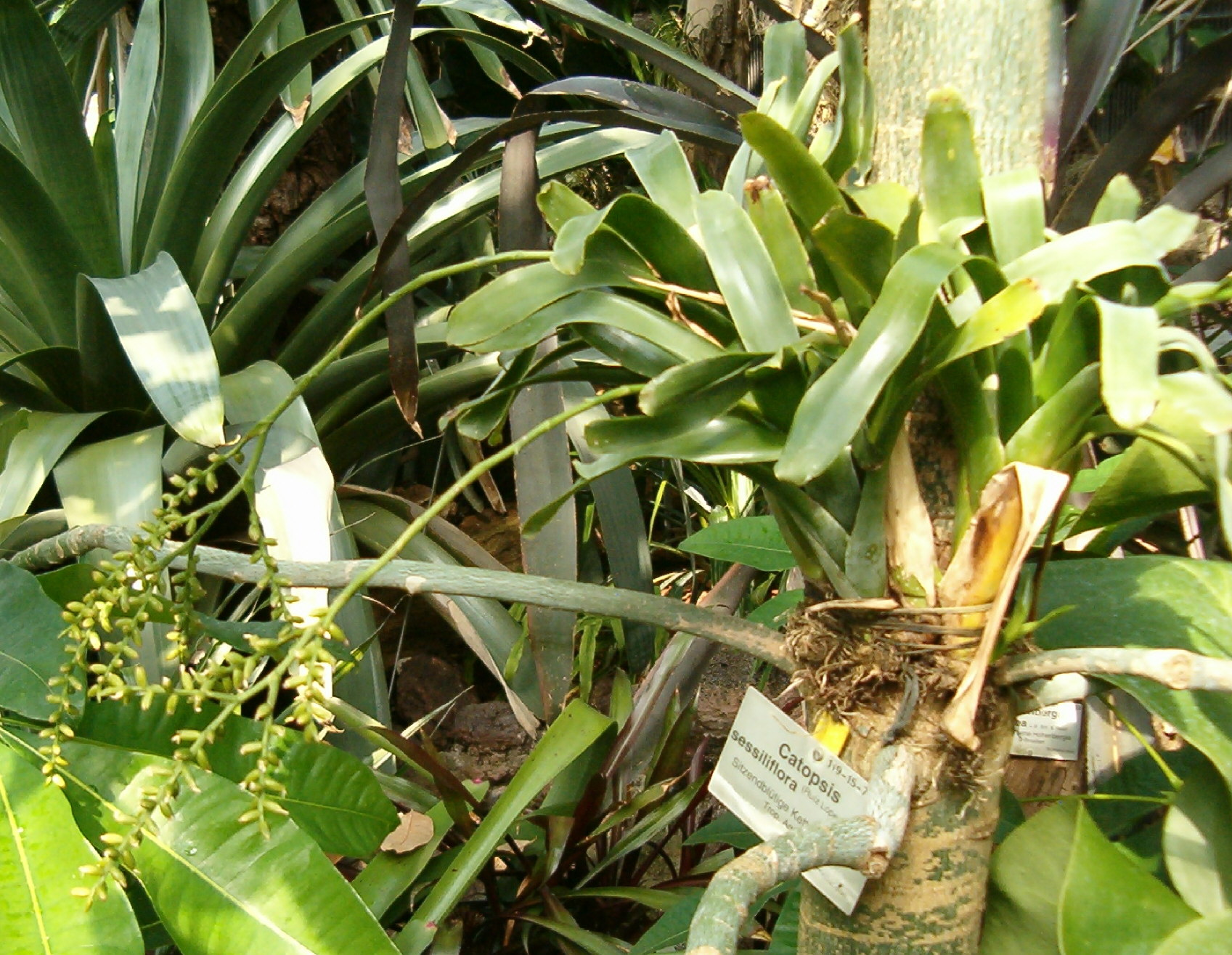

Scientific classification
- Kingdom: Plantae
- Clade: Tracheophytes
- Clade: Angiosperms
- Clade: Monocots
- Clade: Commelinids
- Order: Poales
- Family: Bromeliaceae
- Genus: Catopsis
- Species: C. sessiliflora

Binomial name
- Catopsis sessiliflora (Ruiz & Pav.) Mez

Synonyms
- Tillandsia sessiliflora Ruiz & Pav.; Bromelia sessiliflora (Ruiz & Pav.) Lodd. ex Loudon; Tussacia sessiliflora (Ruiz & Pav.) Beer; Pogospermum sessiliflorum (Ruiz & Pav.) Brongn.; Tillandsia aloides Schltdl. & Cham.; Tillandsia apicroides Schltdl. & Cham.; Tussacia apicroides Beer; Catopsis apicroides (Schltdl. & Cham.) Baker; Catopsis aloides (Schltdl. & Cham.) Baker; Catopsis modesta F.Muell.; Catopsis schindleri Mez & Wercklé; Catopsis tenuis Cufod.

= Catopsis sessiliflora =

Species of flowering plant

Catopsis sessiliflora is a species in the genus Catopsis. This species is native to West Indies, and also to Latin America from Puebla and Jalisco south to Peru.
