= Chrysomyza azurea =

Scientific classification
- Kingdom: Animalia
- Phylum: Arthropoda
- Class: Insecta
- Order: Diptera
- Family: Ulidiidae
- Genus: Chrysomyza
- Species: C. azurea

Binomial name
- Chrysomyza azurea Hendel, 1912

Species of fly

Chrysomyza azurea is a species of ulidiid or picture-winged fly in the genus Chrysomyza of the family Ulidiidae.
