= Dichapetalins =

Small class of triterpenoid compounds

Dichapetalin A

Dichapetalins are a small class of triterpenoid compounds found primarily in the Dichapetalaceae family but also reportedly in Phyllanthus (Euphorbiaceae). They are structural derivatives of dammarene characterized by a C_{6}C_{2} unit connected to a dammarene or a 13,30-cyclodammarane skeleton with variable C-17 side chains containing actone, spirolactone, lactol, acetal, or furan moieties. They have been found to display cytotoxicity against several cancer cell lines.
