= Catopsis paniculata =

Scientific classification
- Kingdom: Plantae
- Clade: Tracheophytes
- Clade: Angiosperms
- Clade: Monocots
- Clade: Commelinids
- Order: Poales
- Family: Bromeliaceae
- Genus: Catopsis
- Species: C. paniculata

Binomial name
- Catopsis paniculata E. Morren

Synonyms
- Catopsis hahnii Baker; Catopsis pendula Baker; Catopsis mexicana L.B.Sm.

Species of flowering plant

Catopsis paniculata is a species in the genus Catopsis. This species is native to Central America and Mexico.
