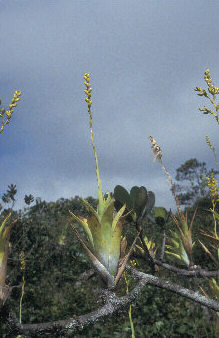
- Catopsis berteroniana

Scientific classification
- Kingdom: Plantae
- Clade: Tracheophytes
- Clade: Angiosperms
- Clade: Monocots
- Clade: Commelinids
- Order: Poales
- Family: Bromeliaceae
- Subfamily: Tillandsioideae
- Genus: Catopsis; Griseb.
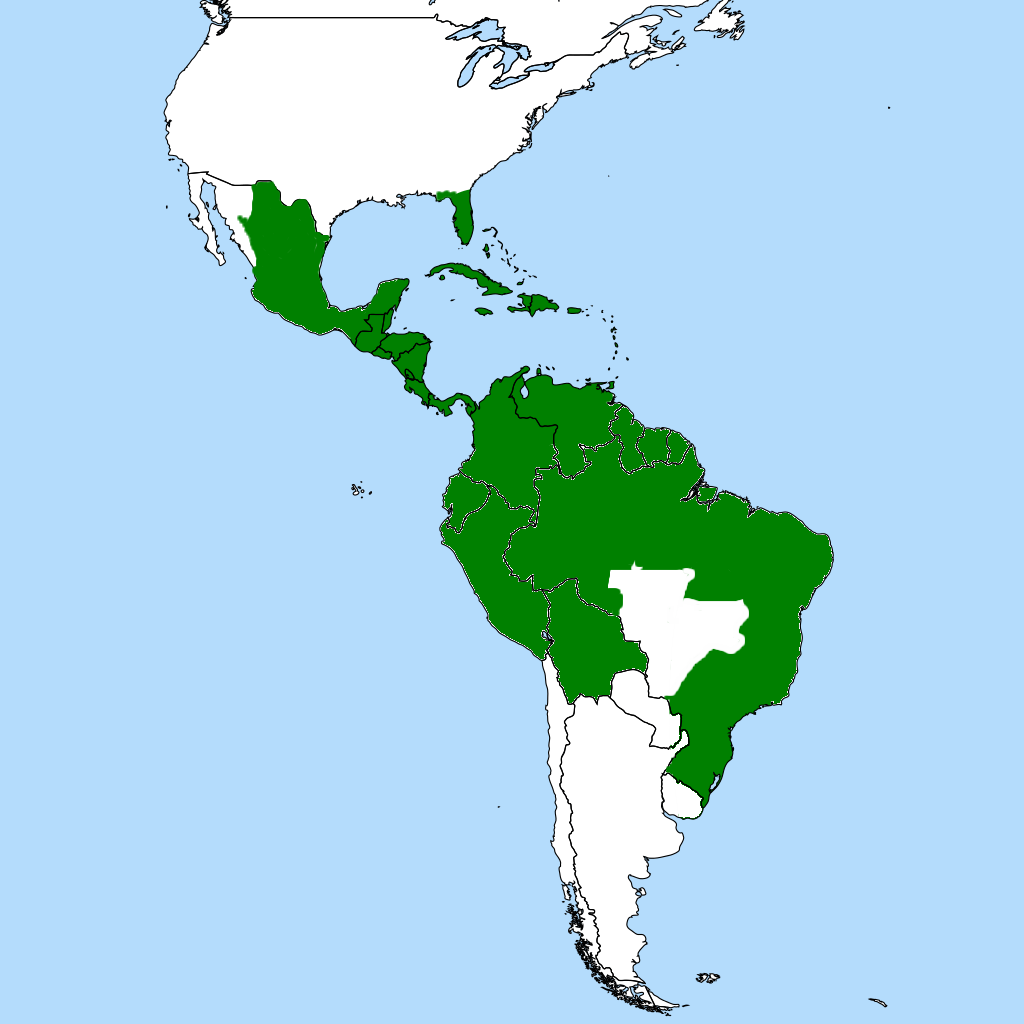
- Catopsis distribution

Synonyms
- Tussacia Klotzsch ex Beer 1856, not Rchb. 1824 nor Willd. ex Schult. & Schult. f. 1829 nor Benth. 1846; Pogospermum Brongn.

= Catopsis =

Genus of flowering plants

Catopsis is a genus in the botanical family Bromeliaceae, subfamily Tillandsioideae. The genus name is from the Greek “kata” (hanging down) and “opsis” (appearance). Catopsis is a genus of plants widespread across much of Latin America from Mexico to Brazil, plus Florida and the West Indies. One of the species, Catopsis berteroniana, is thought to be carnivorous.

== Species ==
Image	Name	Distribution
	Catopsis berteroniana (Schultes f.) Mez	from Bahamas, Florida, Chiapas and Veracruz south to Brazil
	Catopsis compacta Mez	Oaxaca, Chiapas, Jalisco
	Catopsis delicatula L.B. Smith	Guatemala, southern Mexico
	Catopsis floribunda L.B. Smith	West Indies, Venezuela, Honduras, Oaxaca, Florida
	Catopsis juncifolia Mez & Wercklé	from Veracruz to Panama
	Catopsis micrantha L.B. Smith	Panama
	Catopsis minimiflora Matuda	Chiapas
	Catopsis montana L.B.Sm.	Cuba, Central America
	Catopsis morreniana Mez	from Veracruz to Costa Rica
	Catopsis nitida (Hooker) Grisebach	from Veracruz to Panama; Greater Antilles
	Catopsis nutans (Swartz) Grisebach	Florida, Central America, Greater Antilles, Venezuela, Colombia, Ecuador
	Catopsis oerstediana Mez	southern Mexico, Central America
	Catopsis paniculata E. Morren	southern Mexico, Central America
	Catopsis pedicellata L.B.Sm	Guatemala, Costa Rica, southern Mexico
	Catopsis pisiformis Rauh	Panama
	Catopsis sessiliflora (Ruiz & Pavón) Mez	West Indies; Latin America from Puebla and Jalisco south to Peru
	Catopsis subulata L.B. Smith	Guatemala, Honduras, Chiapas, Oaxaca
	Catopsis wangerinii Mez & Wercklé	Central America, Colombia, Chiapas, Veracruz
	Catopsis wawranea Mez	Veracruz, Oaxaca, Belize
	Catopsis werckleana Mez	Costa Rica
