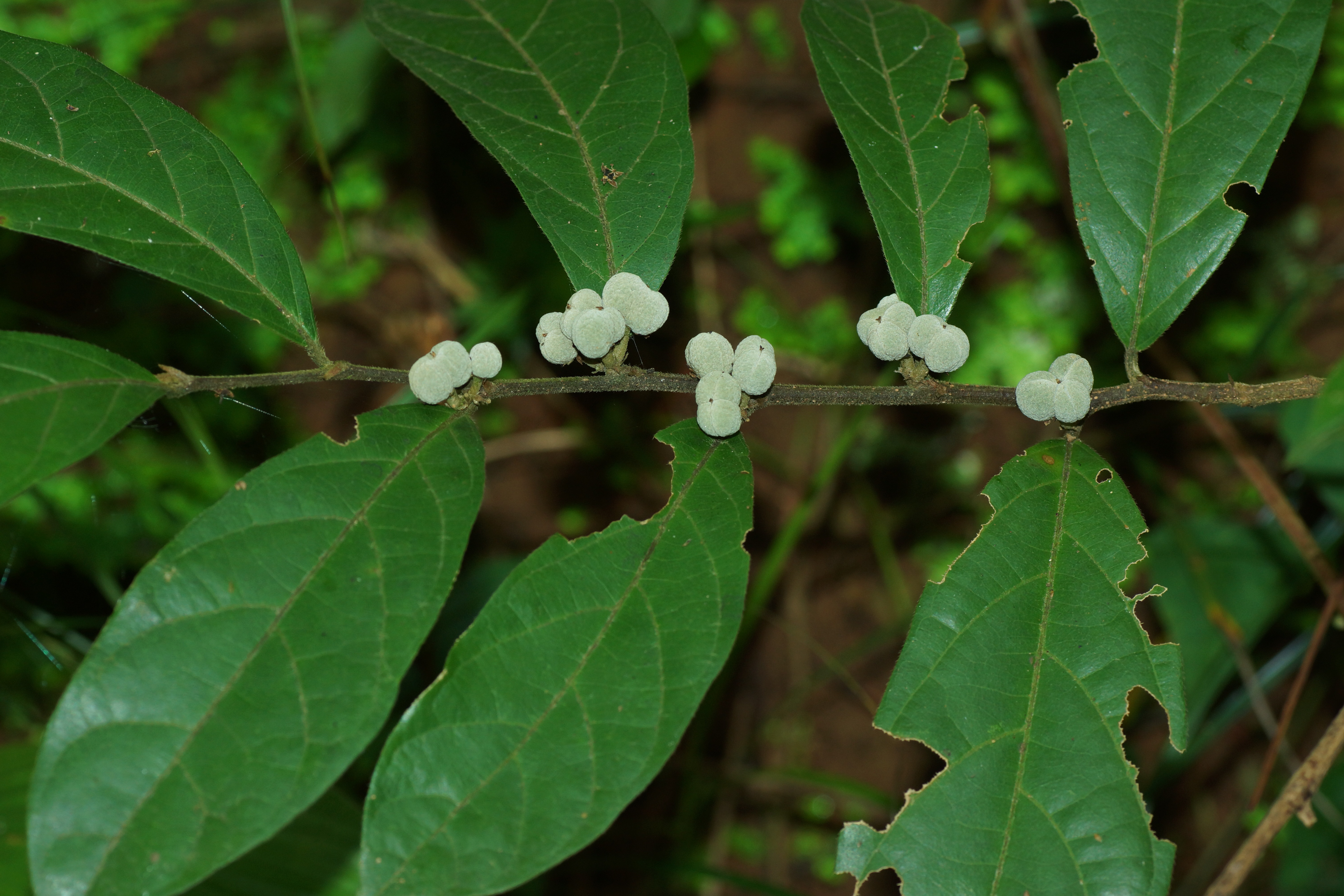

Conservation status
- Least Concern (IUCN 3.1)

Scientific classification
- Kingdom: Plantae
- Clade: Tracheophytes
- Clade: Angiosperms
- Clade: Eudicots
- Clade: Rosids
- Order: Malpighiales
- Family: Dichapetalaceae
- Genus: Dichapetalum
- Species: D. gelonioides

Binomial name
- Dichapetalum gelonioides (Roxb.) Engl.

Synonyms
- Chailletia gelonioides (Roxb.) Bedd.; Chailletia gelonioides (Roxb.) Hook. f.; Dichapetalum howii Merr. & Chun; Dichapetalum kerrii Craib; Elaeocarpus integrifolius Blanco [Illegitimate; Moacurra gelonioides Roxb.

= Dichapetalum gelonioides =

Species of flowering plant

Dichapetalum gelonioides, the gelonium poison-leaf, is a large shrub or small semi-evergreen tree, up to 5 m tall, originally described from Indo-Malaysian region.
