= Arturia africana =

Scientific classification
- Kingdom: Animalia
- Phylum: Porifera
- Class: Calcarea
- Order: Clathrinida
- Family: Clathrinidae
- Genus: Arturia
- Species: A. africana

Binomial name
- Arturia africana (Klautau & Valentine, 2003)

Synonyms
- Clathrina africana Klautau & Valentine, 2003; Arthuria africana Klautau & Valentine, 2003

Species of sponge

Arturia africana is a species of calcareous sponge from South Africa. So far there are only two official records of the species.

== Description ==
Cormus formed of thin, irregular and loosely anastomosed tubes. No water-collecting tubes have been observed. Cells with granules have also not been observed. The skeleton has no special organisation, comprising equiangular and equiradiate triactines and tetractines. Actines are conical, slightly undulated at the distal part, and with a sharp tip. The apical actine of the tetractines is shorter, smooth, conical, straight and sharp, and is always projected into the tubes. It is recorded to have a size between 2 and 200mm.

== Distribution ==
Arturia africana was first found at Agulhas Bank, South Africa. It was found in a sea with waters between 15 and 20 degrees Celsius and with a sea surface salinity of 35 to 40 PSU.

== Behaviour ==
Uses a suspension filter when it comes to feeding.
