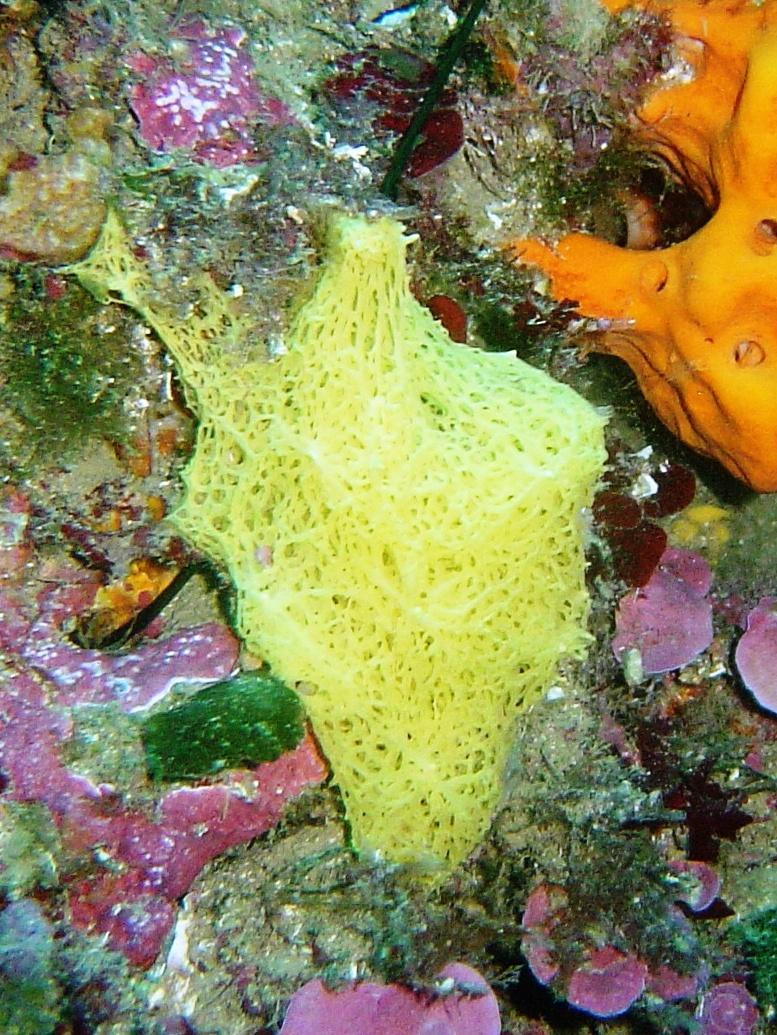
- Clathrina clathrus

Scientific classification
- Kingdom: Animalia
- Phylum: Porifera
- Class: Calcarea
- Subclass: Calcinea; Bidder, 1898

Orders
- Clathrinida; Murrayonida

= Calcinea =

Subclass of calcareous sponges

The Calcinea are a subclass of the calcareous sponges characterized by three-rayed (triactine) spicules whose rays meet at equal angles. The nucleus of their choanocytes lies at the base of the cell, and the flagellum is not directly connected to it. Their larvae are hollow balls of cells called coeloblastulae, and the triactine spicules are the first to form as the sponge grows. Its phylum is Porifera and class is Calcarea. Branching is usually dichotomous or umbellate with anastomoses, which gives rise to reticulate growths on stalks in adults. Most varieties are coral red or sulphur yellow.
