= Catopsis compacta =

Scientific classification
- Kingdom: Plantae
- Clade: Embryophytes
- Clade: Tracheophytes
- Clade: Spermatophytes
- Clade: Angiosperms
- Clade: Monocots
- Clade: Commelinids
- Order: Poales
- Family: Bromeliaceae
- Genus: Catopsis
- Species: C. compacta

Binomial name
- Catopsis compacta Mez

Species of flowering plant

Catopsis compacta is a species of flowering plant in the family Bromeliaceae. This species is endemic to Mexico.
