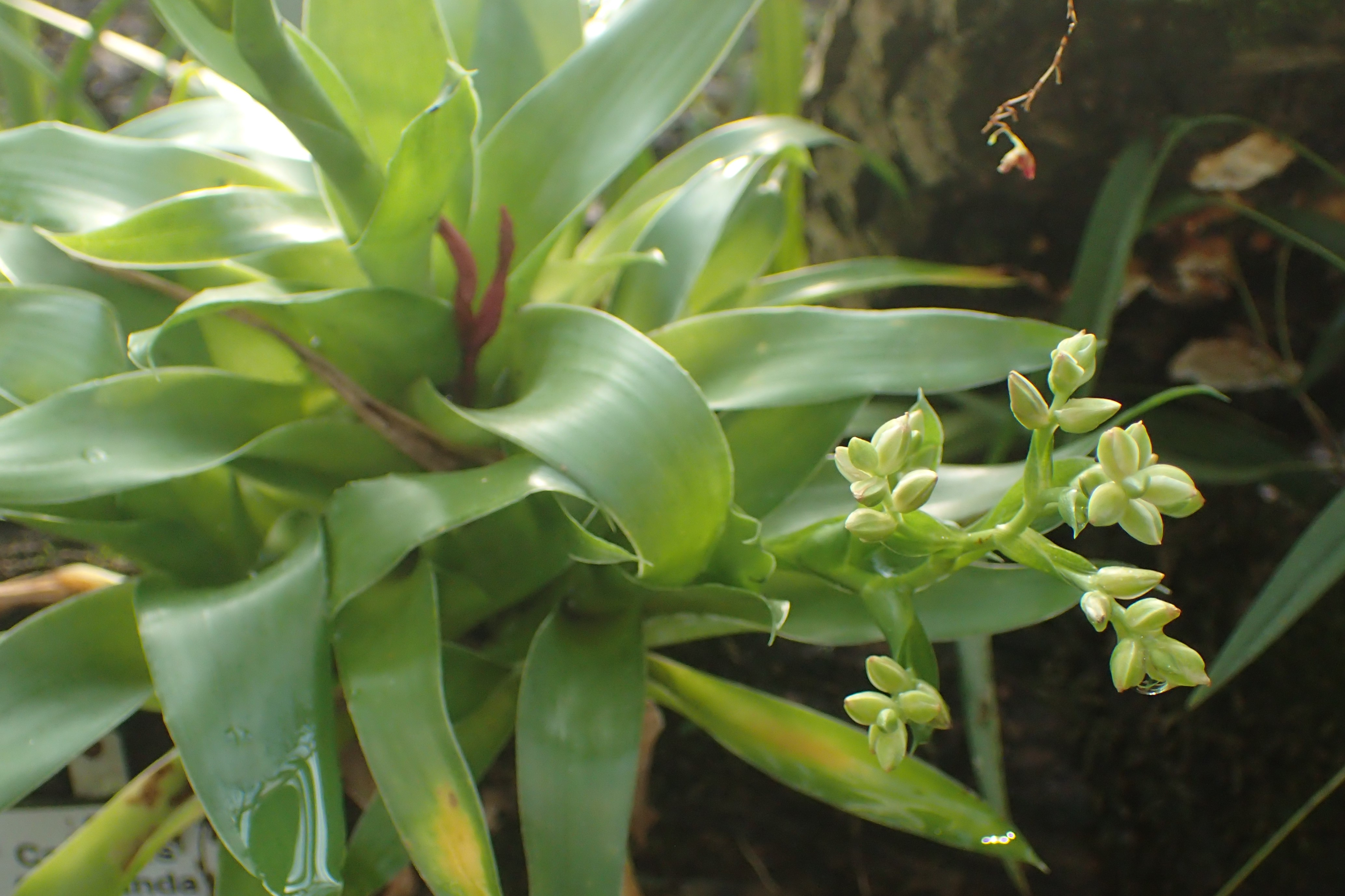

Scientific classification
- Kingdom: Plantae
- Clade: Tracheophytes
- Clade: Angiosperms
- Clade: Monocots
- Clade: Commelinids
- Order: Poales
- Family: Bromeliaceae
- Genus: Catopsis
- Species: C. floribunda

Binomial name
- Catopsis floribunda L.B. Smith

Synonyms
- Pogospermum floribundum Brongn.

= Catopsis floribunda =

Species of flowering plant

Catopsis floribunda is a species in the genus Catopsis. This species is native to the West Indies, Venezuela, Honduras, Oaxaca, and Florida.
