= Chrysomyza africana =

Scientific classification
- Kingdom: Animalia
- Phylum: Arthropoda
- Clade: Pancrustacea
- Class: Insecta
- Order: Diptera
- Family: Ulidiidae
- Genus: Chrysomyza
- Species: C. africana

Binomial name
- Chrysomyza africana Hendel, 1909

Species of fly

Chrysomyza africana is a species of ulidiid or picture-winged fly in the genus Chrysomyza of the family Tephritidae.
