= Arturia canariensis =

Scientific classification
- Kingdom: Animalia
- Phylum: Porifera
- Class: Calcarea
- Order: Clathrinida
- Family: Clathrinidae
- Genus: Arturia
- Species: A. canariensis

Binomial name
- Arturia canariensis (Miklucho-Maclay, 1868)

Synonyms
- Arthuria canariensis (Miklucho-Maclay, 1868); Ascuris arrecifae Haeckel, 1872; Ascuris papillata Haeckel, 1872; Clathrina canariensis (Miklucho-Maclay, 1868); Clathrina sulphurea (Miklucho-Maclay, 1868); Leucosolenia canariensis (Miklucho-Maclay, 1868); Nardoa canariensis Miklucho-Maclay, 1868; Nardoa rubra Miklucho-Maclay, 1868; Nardoa sulphurea Miklucho-Maclay, 1868

Species of sponge

Arturia canariensis, commonly known as the yellow calcareous sponge, is a species of sponge in the family Clathrinidae. It is found in shallow seas in the Canary Islands, Cape Verde, the Adriatic Sea and the Caribbean Sea. The specific epithet "canariensis" was given to this species because it was first described from Lanzarote in the Canary Islands.

== Description ==
Arturia canariensis has a small, lacy structure and is a bright lemon yellow colour. It is an asconoid with many tiny flask-like tubes. Water is drawn in through fine holes near their base, the ostia, moved along by flagella and expelled from the oscula at the top, each osculum being a single exit formed from many fused ascon tubes. The skeleton is composed of large calcareous spicules called megascleres, made predominantly of calcite, forming a soft, fragile, supporting network. The whole sponge can grow to 10 centimetres (3.9 in) in diameter. Small individuals form tufts but larger ones have gentle folds, with oscula along their ridges.

== Distribution and habitat ==
Arturia canariensis is found in the Canary Islands, Cape Verde, the Adriatic Sea and off the coast of Croatia. It is also found on the other side of the Atlantic in the Caribbean Sea, the Gulf of Mexico, the Bahamas, the Dry Tortugas, Florida and Bermuda. It is usually found at depths between 8 and 23 metres (26 and 75 ft). It grows on shady rock substrates and in caves but its preferred location is the underside of ledges formed by horizontal, plate-like layers of coral. It is often found growing in these locations with coralline algae and bryozoans in a rich, diverse community. In a 2007 survey of sponges off the coast of Georgia, Arturia canariensis was discovered in cryptic locations under rocks, in crevices and overgrown by other organisms. This was an extension of its previous known range.

== Biology ==
Arturia canariensis is a filter feeder, sieving plankton and other organic material out of the current of water as it passes through the ostia.

Both asexual reproduction by budding and sexual reproduction take place in Arturia canariensis. As in other species, each sponge is a hermaphrodite. Sperm is liberated into the sea and some is drawn into other sponges with the water current that passes through them. Fertilisation is then internal and the eggs are brooded in the ascon tubes of the sponge until they hatch. The free-swimming larvae are expelled through the oscula and disperse with the currents. After a few days they settle on the seabed and develop into juvenile sponges.
