= Constricta (fungus) =

Scientific classification
- Kingdom: Fungi
- Division: Basidiomycota
- Class: Agaricomycetes
- Order: Agaricales
- Family: Agaricaceae
- Genus: Constricta; R. Heim & Mel.-Howell

Type species
- Constricta africana R. Heim & Mel.-Howell

Genus of fungi

Constricta is a genus of fungi in the family Agaricaceae. This is a monotypic genus, containing the single species Constricta africana. Not much is known about C. africana, other than its appearance.
