= Clathrina ceylonensis =

Scientific classification
- Kingdom: Animalia
- Phylum: Porifera
- Class: Calcarea
- Order: Clathrinida
- Family: Clathrinidae
- Genus: Clathrina
- Species: C. ceylonensis

Binomial name
- Clathrina ceylonensis (Dendy, 1905)

Synonyms
- Leucosolenia ceylonensis

Species of sponge

Clathrina ceylonensis is a species of calcareous sponge from Sri Lanka. The species name is derived from Ceylon, the former name of Sri Lanka.

== Description ==
Cormus massive, formed of thin, irregular and tightly anastomosed tubes, with a reticulated surface. According to the original description, water-collecting tubes were present. The skeleton has no special organisation, comprising equiangular and equiradiate triactines. Actines are conical, with blunt tips, never rounded. Dendy described this species as a variety of Clathrina coriacea. He noted the presence of water-collecting tubes as 'small but prominent true oscula formed each by the coalescence of several tubes in a projection from the general surface'. He also found triactines measuring about 88 mm/8 mm, and 'few very slender oxea', which were probably trichoxeas. Klautau and Valentine studied the holotype. No trichoxeas were found, but these spicules are sometimes difficult to find. Klautau and Valentine therefore decided not to consider the presence of trichoxeas in their description. Klautau and Valentine elevated this variety to the status of a species because C. ceylonensis is very distinct from C. coriacea. Despite morphological similarities, such as the presence of water-collecting tubes and the size of the triactines, they can easily be distinguished. C. coriacea has undulated actines with a constriction near the tip, which is rounded or blunt, while C. ceylonensis has straight actines with blunt, unrounded tips. The distribution of C. coriacea seems to be restricted to northern Europe, while C. ceylonensis occurs only in the Indian Ocean.
