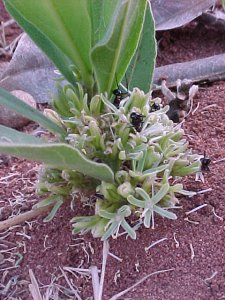
- Gifblaar or ratbane (Dichapetalum cymosum)

Scientific classification
- Kingdom: Plantae
- Clade: Tracheophytes
- Clade: Angiosperms
- Clade: Eudicots
- Clade: Rosids
- Order: Malpighiales
- Family: Dichapetalaceae; Baill.

Genera
- Dichapetalum; Stephanopodium; Tapura

= Dichapetalaceae =

Family of flowering plants

Dichapetalaceae is a family of flowering plants, consisting of 3 genera and about 170 species. Members of this family are trees, shrubs or lianas found in tropical and subtropical regions of the world.

The species Dichapetalum cymosum of Southern Africa is highly poisonous because of fluoroacetate.
