= Edvard August Vainio =

Finnish lichenologist (1853–1929)

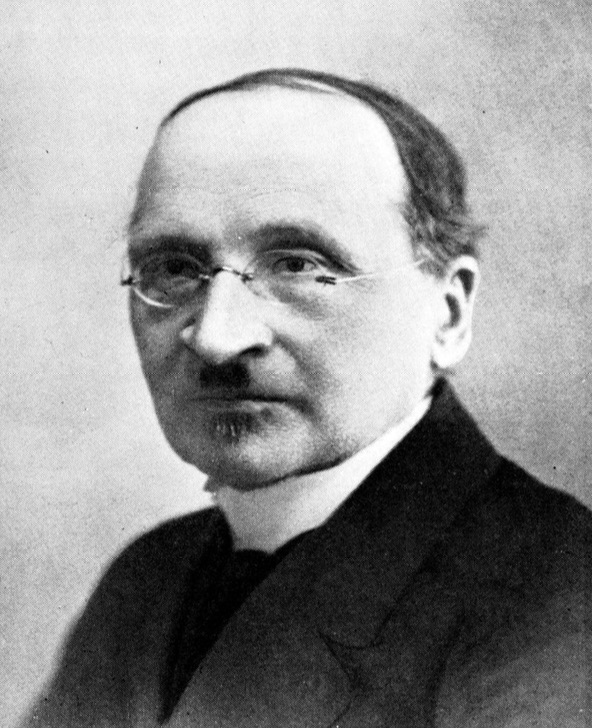
- Vainio in 1924 at age 71
- Born: Edvard Lang; 5 August 1853; Pieksämäki, Grand Duchy of Finland, Russian Empire
- Died: 14 May 1929 (aged 75); Turku, Finland
- Education: University of Helsinki
- Scientific career
- Fields: Lichenology
- Workplaces: University of Helsinki; University of Turku
- Author abbrev. (botany): Vain.

Edvard August Vainio (born Edvard Lang; (Note: His family name was originally Lang; in 1877 he adopted the Finnish name Wainio, with an initial "W", which was a common practice at that time in the Finnish language. In 1919, he adopted the modern spelling Vainio (see below).) 5 August 1853 – 14 May 1929) was a Finnish lichenologist. His early works on the lichens of Lapland, his three-volume monograph on the lichen genus Cladonia, and, in particular, his study of the classification and form and structure of lichens in Brazil, made Vainio renowned internationally in the field of lichenology.

Young Vainio's friendship with university student Johan Petter Norrlin, who was nearly eleven years older, helped him develop an impressive knowledge of the local cryptogams (ferns, mosses, algae, and fungi, including lichens) and afforded him ample opportunity to hone his collection and identification techniques at an early age. It was through this association that Vainio met Norrlin's teacher, the prominent lichenologist William Nylander, who supported his early botanical efforts. Vainio's earliest works dealt with phytogeography—elucidating and enumerating the local flora—and are considered the earliest publications on phytogeography in the Finnish language. In these early publications he demonstrated an attention to detail and thoroughness that would become characteristic of his later work.

After graduating from the University of Helsinki in 1880, Vainio became a docent, meaning he was qualified to teach academically, but without a regular salary. Despite his scientific successes and the international recognition he gained through his research, he never obtained a permanent position in this university. This was a result, he said, of his intense Finnish nationalism and desire to promote the use of the Finnish language in academia during a time of language strife, when Latin dominated the scientific literature, and Swedish was the predominant language of administration and education. Disillusioned with his prospects for permanent academic employment, and faced with the reality of having to provide for his family, he was obliged to accept a position with the Russian censorship authority, which led to his ostracism by the Finnish scientific community.

Vainio described about 1900 new species, and published more than 100 scientific works. He made significant scientific collections of lichens, and, as a result of his many years of work as herbarium curator at both the University of Helsinki, and later the University of Turku, he catalogued and processed other collections from all over the world, including the Arctic and Antarctica. Because of the significance of his works on lichens in the tropics and other locales, he has been called the Father of Brazilian lichenology and the Grand Old Man of lichenology.

== Early life ==
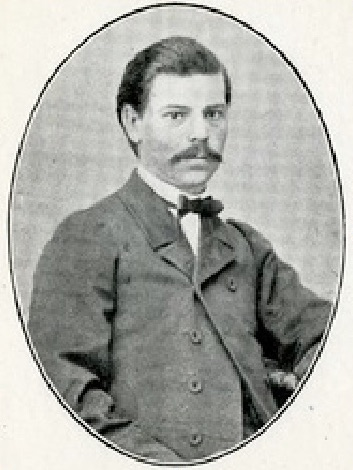
Johan Petter Norrlin (shown here at 23 years old) was Edvard Lang's neighbour and early mentor, and later became his brother-in-law.

Edvard Lang was born on 5 August 1853 in Pieksämäki in the eastern Grand Duchy of Finland, part of the Russian Empire. Brought up in a poor home, he was one of several children of bailiff Carl Johan Lang and his wife Adolfina Polén. Edvard's early interest in natural history was manifested in his interest in flowers and his mineral collection; his favourite flower was the marsh willowherb (Epilobium palustre). His eldest brother, Joel Napoleon Lang, was also an avid naturalist, and would later become a well-known legal scholar. In the early 1860s, the family relocated to the municipality of Hollola near Lake Vesijärvi in southern Finland due to his father's work, settling in a farm near the neighbouring municipality of Asikkala. Here Edvard met Johan Petter Norrlin, the son of a neighbour. At the time, Norrlin, who was 11 years his senior, was a university student studying phytogeography, or the geographical distribution of plant species. Norrlin would marry Lang's sister in 1873.

Norrlin had become interested in cryptogams after hearing university lectures given by the well-known lichenologist William Nylander at the Imperial Alexander University (today known as the University of Helsinki), and he became Nylander's student. Norrlin developed an expertise in the local cryptogam flora, particularly the lichens, which are quite diverse in Finland. Lang accompanied and assisted him during field trips in the summers of 1868 and 1869 in the vicinity of Lake Vesijärvi, eagerly absorbing and accumulating knowledge. When Norrlin published Beiträge zur Flora des südöstlichen Tavastlands ("Writings on the flora of south-eastern Tavastia Province") in 1870, he credited Lang—at the time still a schoolboy—for numerous and valuable contributions to his work.

== Education ==
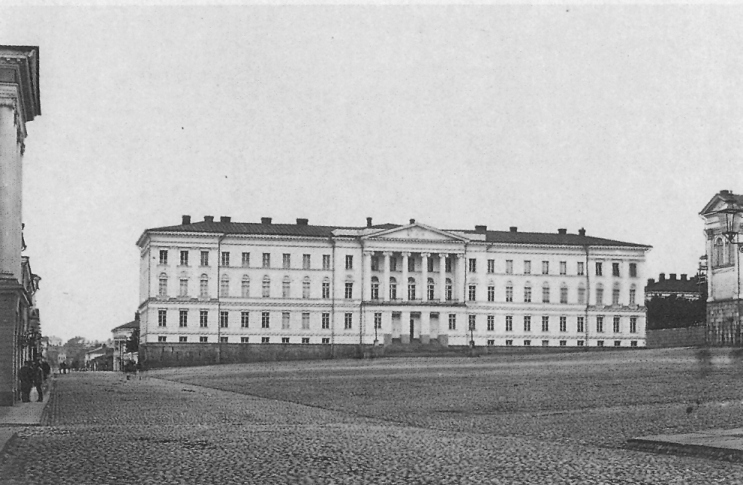
Imperial Alexander University around 1870

Lang graduated from the Jyväskylä Secondary School in Jyväskylä in 1870. He began his studies at the Imperial Alexander University the same year, and under the guidance of Norrlin studied botany, phytogeography, and lichenology. As a young student, in 1871, Lang was granted membership in the Societas pro Fauna et Flora Fennica (Finnish Association for Science and Flora), which is the oldest scientific society in Finland. Lang was particularly skilled at identifying and collecting specimens in the field. During the summers of 1873 and 1874 he collected 472 different lichen species from the parishes of Luhanka and Korpilahti in Central Finland, and in spring of the following year, he recorded 324 species in the vicinity of Vyborg. In one of Nylander's publications, eleven new species were described based on the collections of "E. Lang". A grateful Nylander ordered and sent Lang a microscope in the summer of 1874 to help him with his botanical studies. In letters between Norrlin and Nylander, the latter praised Lang's collecting ability, writing "He is a sharp and fit collector of lichens. With a little work and the help of a decent microscope, he will probably soon surpass everyone else in the North, where no one is better than he in this respect." (Note: "Hän on terävä ja kelpo jäkälien kerääjä. Hieman työskentelemällä ja kelvollisen mikroskoopin avulla hän varmaan pian ylittää kaikki muut Pohjolassa, jossa ei näy ketään häntä parempaa kykyä tässä suhteessa.") Lang received his Candidate of Philosophy in 1874 and began work on his licentiate degree.

During his time as a graduate student, Vainio, who had by now given up his original surname, published two works on the cryptogams of Finland: Lichenes in viciniis Viburgi observati ("Lichens observed in the vicinity of Viburg") (1878) and Florula Tavastiae orientalis ("Flora of east Tavastia") (1878), which dealt with the results of his collecting excursions. In these publications, Vainio analysed and identified the lichen material he collected from the Vyborg region, including new species observations, without assistance from Norrlin or Nylander. Another early publication, Adjumenta ad Lichenographiam Lapponiae fennicae atque Fenniae borealis ("Adjustments to the lichens of Finnish Lapland and northern Finland"; published in two parts in 1881 and 1883) was based on material he had collected in 1875 and 1877 in desolate locations near the border of the Grand Duchy of Finland and Russia, including North Karelia, Kainuu, Koillismaa, eastern Lapland, and Russian Karelia. Vainio included 626 species in this publication, of which 70 were new to science. He had botanical explorations in Kuusamo and along the Paatsjoki River, but his time on the Russian side of the border was cut short because of lack of funding.

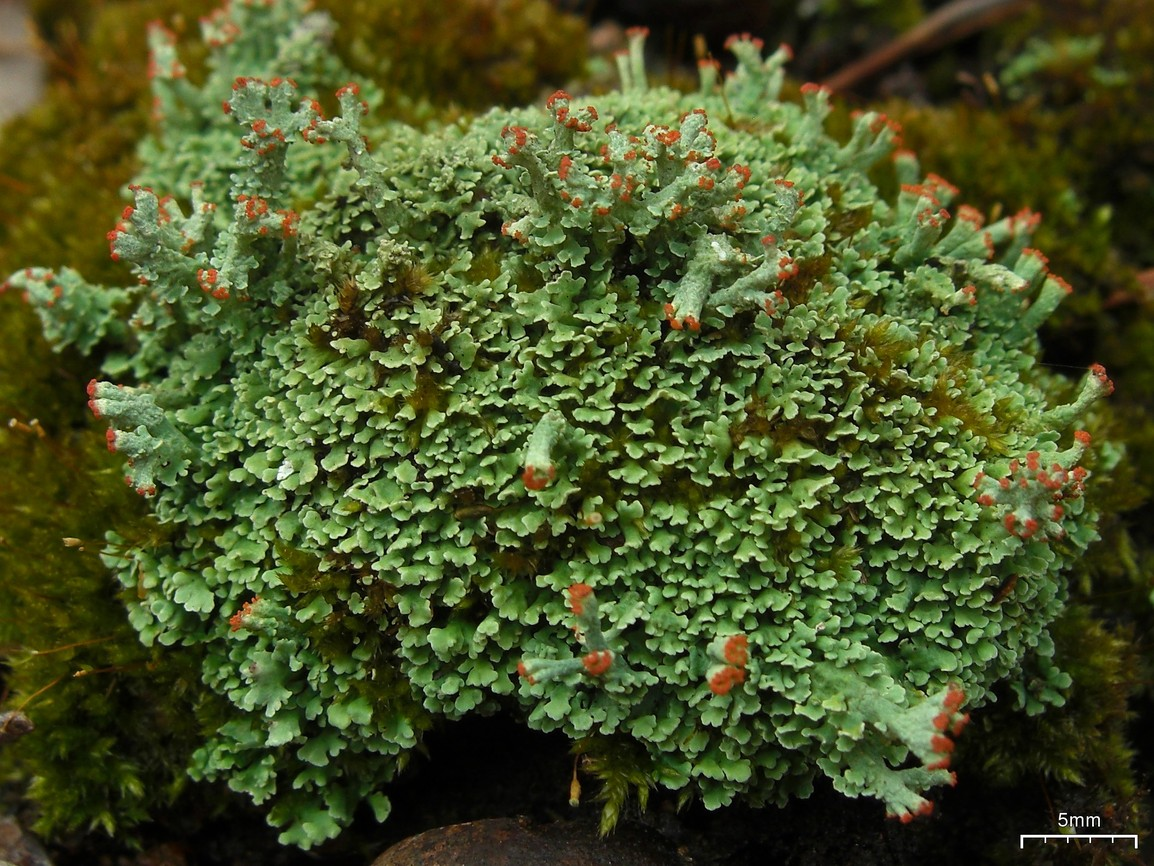
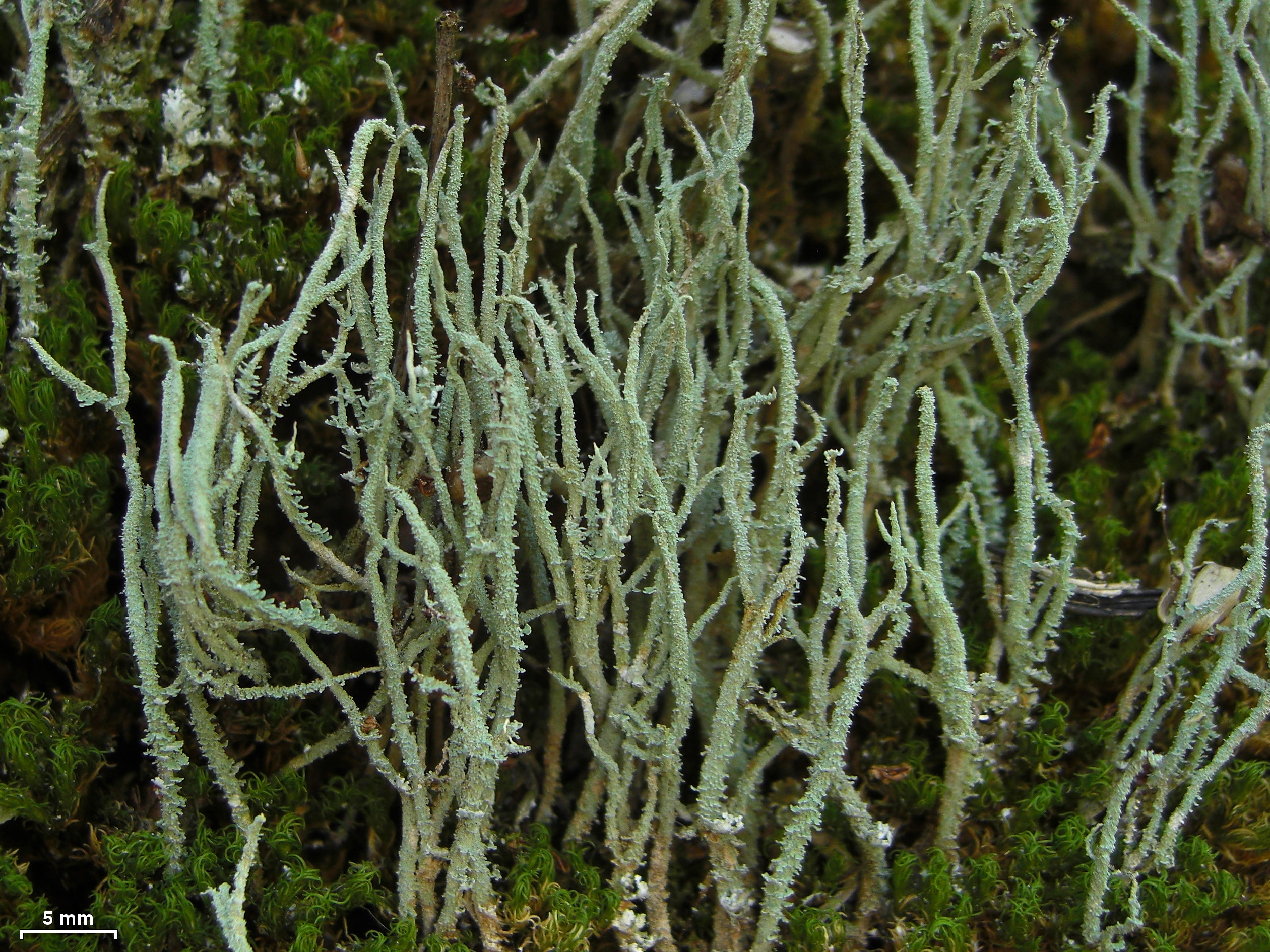
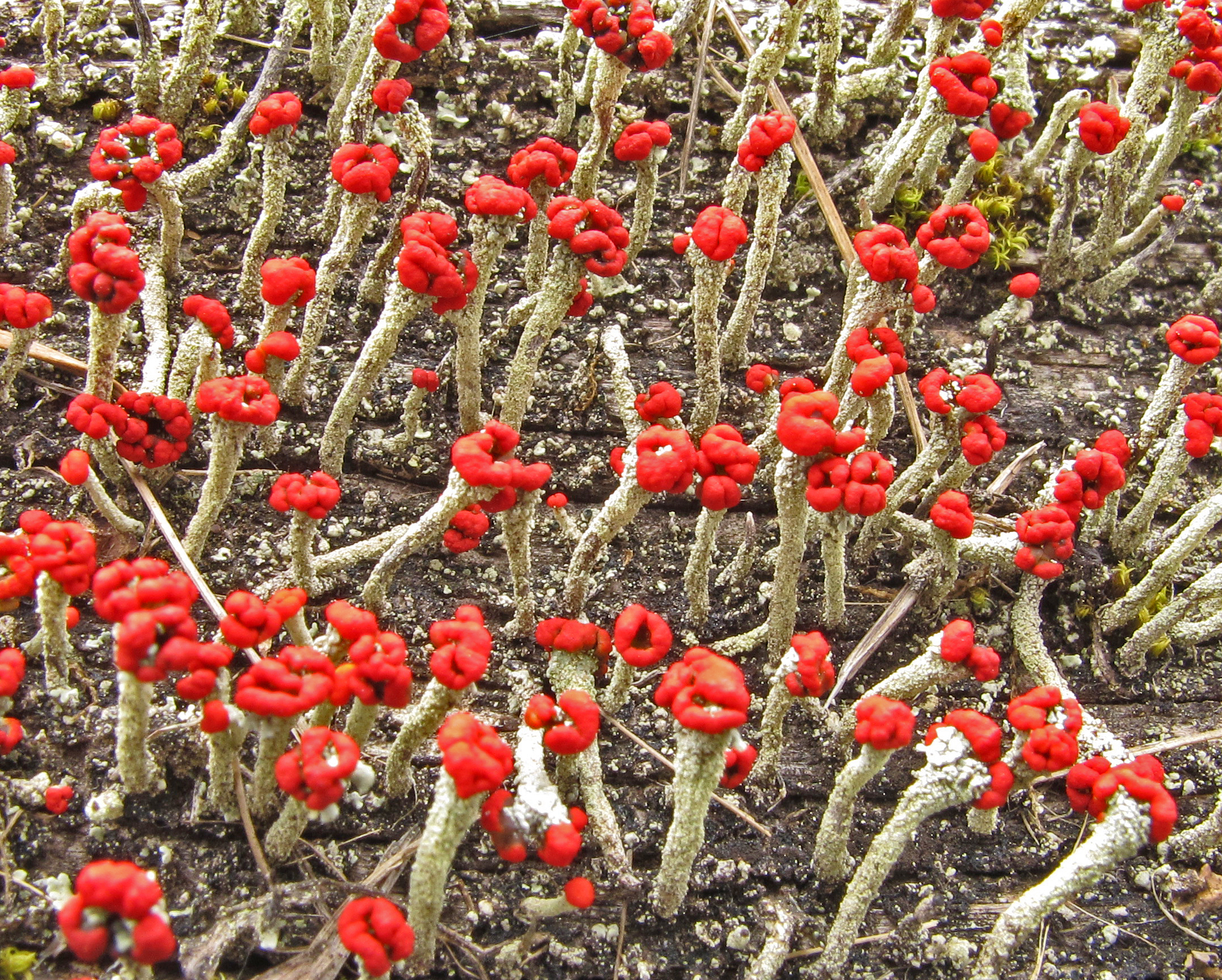
Vainio described many new Cladonia species, including C. sobolescens (top), C. subradiata (middle), and C. transcendens (bottom).

In these works—considered the earliest publications on phytogeography in the Finnish language—Vainio meticulously catalogued the moisture, light, and soil conditions of the places where he collected, and defined terms that would eventually become standard terminology in the field. Vainio's work has been described as ahead of its time, because he not only described plant communities but also identified ecological factors that increased or decreased the dominance of different kinds of vegetation and distributional limits for different species. As noted by Adolf Hugo Magnusson in his 1930 obituary of Vainio, the characteristics that would represent his later work were evident already in these early publications:

the keen observations, the detailed descriptions and the careful study of the specimens in question. He was never superficial in his work nor prone to hasty inferences however numerous and extensive were the collections submitted to him for examination and for determination. An extreme trustworthiness, thorough investigation and unyielding consistency distinguish the whole of his work.

Nylander, however, disliked Vainio's use of Finnish as the language of his publications and this marked the start of a downward turn in their professional relationship. In a letter to Norrlin (dated 20 March 1876), he wrote

It is sad for the science as also for Mr Candidate Lang that he has written in Finnish the mentioned work. If he does not want to accommodate Latin he is lost for the intelligent world, and it really would be a great misfortune because he has an excellent talent. But it is true that among the characteristics of childhood and youth, often generously granted by nature, the most common is obstinacy, which has a damaging and destroying direction, destroying both for the individual and his neighborhood. To write special botany in Finnish goes out as if a Frenchman would deliver such a work in Breton or Basque or another of the dialects of the 12 tribes, which jointly constitute the French nation.

In 1880, Vainio defended his dissertation for his licentiate. According to the practice of the time, this qualified him as a docent and gave him teaching rights at the University of Helsinki, although there was no guarantee of a regular salary. His thesis was a study of the phylogeny (evolutionary relationships) of Cladonia, a large and widespread genus of fruticose lichens that includes the reindeer lichen and British soldiers lichen species. Titled Tutkimus Cladoniain phylogenetillisestä kehityksestä ("An Investigation on the Phylogenetic Development of the Cladoniae"), this work was the first dissertation on natural science that was published in the Finnish language. According to his colleague and biographer Kaarlo Linkola, "this paper of 62 printed pages was sensational on account of its modern theme, as well as its youthful freshness and its originality". Vainio supported the theory of evolution in his work, and proposed that the science of systematics required an examination of phylogeny, rather than mechanical categorization based on sometimes superficial characters. At the same time, Vainio's research contradicted some of Nylander's previous work by identifying flaws in the way he defined species in Cladonia. In this work, Vainio maintained that the theory of evolution had disrupted the foundations of taxonomy to such an extent that it essentially had to be rebuilt. Such a radical outlook was viewed with some reservation by Johan Reinhold Sahlberg (docent in entomology) and Sextus Otto Lindberg (Professor of Botany), who were charged with assessing Vainio's work. In the end, however, they noted Vainio's detailed valuable morphological investigations and recommended that the dissertation be approved.

== Career ==
During his undergraduate days, Vainio took on several temporary positions to support himself. These included work as a translator of Swedish and Finnish for the Uusimaa Provincial Government in 1874; teaching natural history, physics, and gymnastics at a school (Viipurin Realikoulu) in Vyborg in 1875; and, from 1879 to 1881, teaching at the Jyväskylä seminary. In 1880, when Vainio qualified to become a docent at the University of Helsinki, he started lecturing on botany. These were the first botany courses given in the Finnish language; Swedish continued to be the primary language for instruction at the university until 1918. His courses consisted of lessons in microscopy, which were mostly given in his home, or on field trips to hunt for cryptogams. Even during his docentship, Vainio continued to work additional modest jobs. He taught botany at the Leppäsuo horticultural school (1878–1882), and taught natural sciences at the Swedish Private Lyceum (1879–1882), the Swedish Real Lyceum (1881–1884), the Finnish Primary School (1882–1884), the Finnish Girls' School (1882–1884) and the Finnish Graduate School (1882–1884). He did not enjoy teaching, and is said to have had difficulties in maintaining discipline in his classrooms.

=== Work abroad ===
Early in his career, with the help of grants from the university, Vainio made several scientific expeditions abroad. In 1880, accompanying Swedish physician and explorer Ernst Almquist, he investigated the eastern slopes of the Middle Urals in western Siberia. These included the Konda River area extending from the river Irtysh to Lake Satyga. The results of this botanical excursion were not published until almost 50 years later. In 1882, he took trips to Berlin and Rostock to botanical museums and herbaria to study the Cladonia specimens located there; and in 1884–1885 to botanical museums in Moscow, Vienna, Geneva, Paris, and London. It was during a second trip to Paris in 1889–1890 that he would meet his future wife.

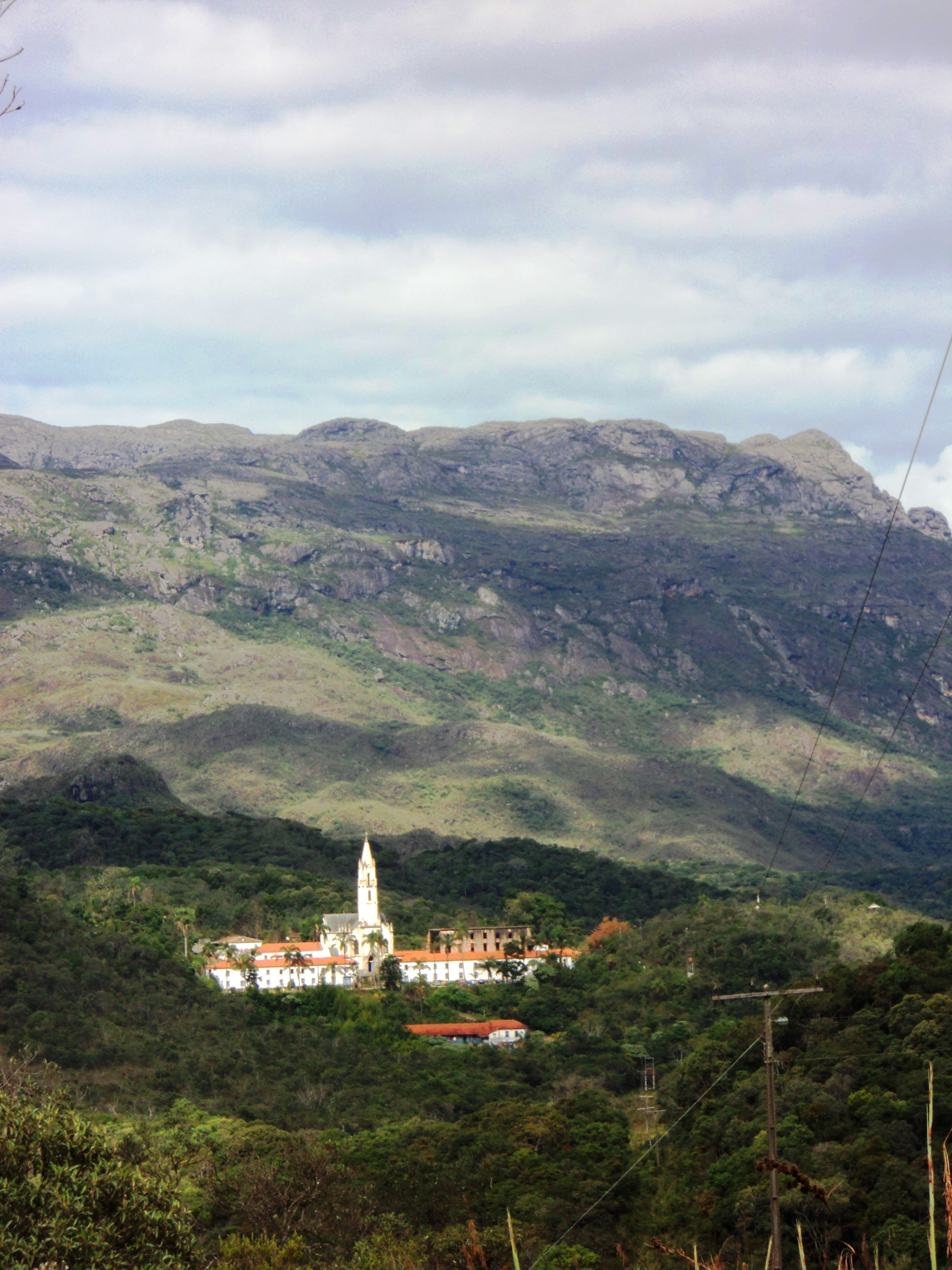
During his time in the Caraça Mountains, Vainio stayed at the Santuário do Caraça, shown here. The Pico do Sol is the highest peak in the upper right.

Vainio was one of the first European lichenologists to perform field work in the tropics. After being granted a stipend from the university, in 1885 Vainio undertook a year-long expedition to Brazil, collecting primarily lichens in the vicinity of Rio de Janeiro and in Minas Gerais. He spent some time initially in Sítio (now known as Antônio Carlos), and then in Lafayette (now Conselheiro Lafaiete). Many of his type specimens were collected from these locations. He wrote favourably of the conditions there: "Sítio was a very convenient place for my work: it offered opportunities to study the plant life in the forests as well as in the grasslands. The dryness of the air was also favorable for getting my specimens properly (pressed) and dried." In Rio de Janeiro, Vainio met the French botanist, and later landscape designer for Brazilian royalty, Auguste François Marie Glaziou, who advised him on possible travel routes. It was also during this initial part of the trip that he met a French naturalist named Germain, with whom he had several collecting excursions. Germain advised Vainio against travelling via his originally intended route, and convinced him instead to visit the biodiverse Caraça Mountains, north of Ouro Branco. It was here that the Caraça sanctuary was located, a monastery where Germain himself had stayed, and which welcomed scientists as guests. Some of the monks residing there were interested in science and collected insects and plants. The monastery had a large library, including works on the local flora, such as Carl Friedrich Philipp von Martius' influential work Flora Brasiliensis. The French entomologist Pierre-Émile Gounelle stayed at the monastery while Vainio was there, and some of their collecting work was done together.

Vainio's tools for fieldwork in Brazil included a knife, hammer, chisel, paper, and a bag. He also carried a shotgun for protection against jaguars. In one of his later collecting trips in the Caraça Mountains, Vainio ventured out alone to the highest peak of the eastern mountain ranges, the Pico do Sol—2,107 m (6,913 ft). Because of his relatively poor knowledge of the terrain, he misjudged the distances involved as well as the amount of available daylight. He ended up spending a night in a wet, sandfly-infested cave without food, water, or a way to make fire. It was only the next morning he was able to find a stream to quench his extreme thirst, and not until the afternoon, when, exhausted, he eventually found his way back to the monastery. During his week-long recovery, one of the monks had to extract sandfly larvae from large bulges on the back of his neck. By the end of his time in Caraça, he had collected a large volume of specimens. Vainio went on to Rio de Janeiro, making excursions to coastal areas such as Niterói, the Tijuca mountains, and the Sepetiba region. With the permission of museum director Ladislau de Souza Mello Netto, Vainio studied at the National Museum of Brazil. Vainio returned from Brazil with about 1600 samples packed in five large crates. He worked with this material in Helsinki for the next few years; the material he collected was so abundant that during a few months of study in Paris during 1889–1890, he issued the exsiccata "Lichenes brasilienses exsiccati", a set of 1593 dried herbarium specimen units distributed in eight copies.

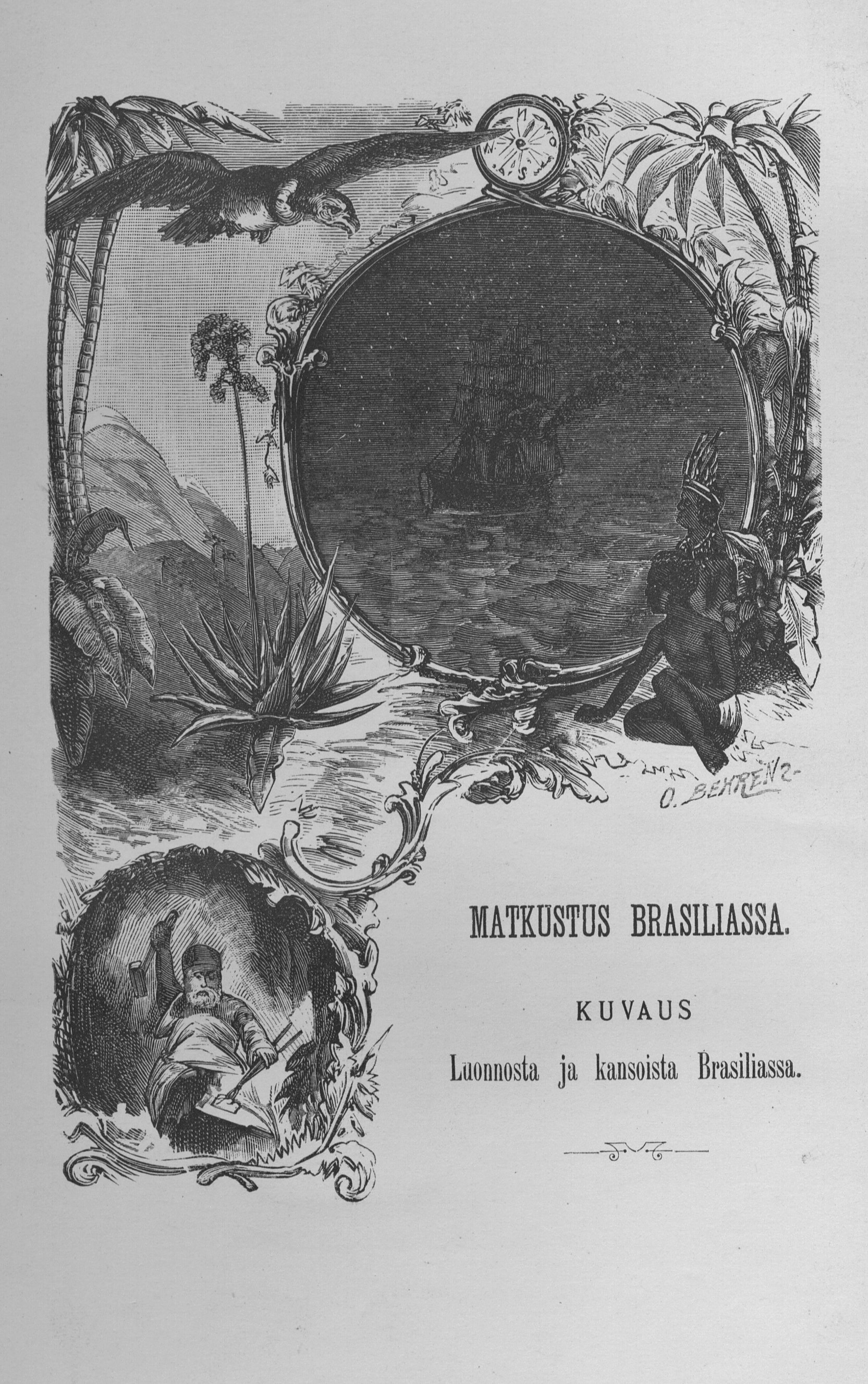
Cover of Vainio's 1888 popular travel account Matkustus Brasiliassa. Kuvaus luonnosta ja kansoista Brasiliassa

=== Work in Finland ===
As well as his scholarly work published later, Vainio published in Finnish a popular account of his travels in Brazil, Matkustus Brasiliassa. Kuvaus luonnosta ja kansoista Brasiliassa ("Travels in Brazil. A Description of Nature and Travels in Brazil") (1888). This book combines a description of his travel adventures with a folkloric account of Brazil, its flora and fauna, and its inhabitants. Vainio does not indicate in this book nor in his later scholarly work the reason for visiting Brazil in the first place. German botanist Fritz Mattick suggests that the idea may have originated from the fact that several botanists from the Nordic countries had lived in the interior of Minas Gerais, including Danish naturalist Peter Wilhelm Lund, who lived in Lagoa Santa and made palaeontological discoveries in the nearby limestone caves; and Danish botanist Peter Clausen and his assistant Eugenius Warming. Cladonia specimens that were collected by Warming are mentioned in Vainio's monograph.

In 1887, Vainio published the first of his three-volume monograph on Cladonia, titled Monographia Cladoniarum universalis ("Universal Monograph on Cladonia"); the final volume was published in 1897. This was an extensive work written in Latin, totalling 1277 pages, on all aspects of this group of lichens. It included descriptions of species old and new, analysis of species synonymy, distribution records, and detailed analysis of the structure and development of the Cladoniae. The publication of just the first volume had already secured Vainio's reputation as a prominent lichenologist. This major work was later judged to be the best work during this era in the field of lichen research. As an indication of the accuracy and reliability of Vainio's work, a 1998 study showed that of the 18 new Cladonia species he described from Brazil a century before, 16 were still considered valid species.

Vainio also published several works based on analysis of collections made by others. For example, Vainio processed and identified lichens collected from tropical Africa by explorers and botanists Friedrich Welwitsch and Hans Schinz. He assumed responsibility for the European collections of Hungarian lichenologist Hugó Lojka after he died at a relatively young age. In 1899, after the death of William Nylander, his collections were transferred from Paris to the University of Helsinki, where it was Vainio's responsibility to arrange and catalogue them: they contained a total of 51,066 specimens. Although his relationship with the university was strained at the time, there was no-one else qualified for the job. Vainio published works based on collections he was sent from locations such as Puerto Rico, Japan, Thailand, Tahiti, and Trinidad.

In some instances, his studies of material sent to him by other scientists greatly advanced the knowledge of the local flora from where they were sent. For example, Vainio was sent for identification the collections of Portuguese botanist and army doctor Américo Pires de Lima, who made them as part of a military campaign in Mozambique during 1916–1917. Vainio's results were published posthumously; of the 138 taxa he identified, about half were previously unknown to science. In another instance, Vainio identified the lichens collected by Ernst Almquist from the Vega Expedition of 1878–1880 through the Arctic coast of Eurasia; about 100 species were previously unknown. As a result of scientific investigations initiated by the Philippine Organic Act of 1902, American and Filipino botanists surveyed the flora of the Philippines, gathering a large amount of lichens in the process. This material was organised by Elmer Drew Merrill who sent it to Vainio for identification. This collaboration ultimately resulted in almost 500 pages of text over four publications from 1909 to 1923. Vainio described 92 genera and 680 species; almost two-thirds of the species were previously unknown. Before these publications, only about 30 lichen species had been documented in the country.

=== Application for professorship ===
As the culmination of his studies in Brazil, in 1890 Vainio published Étude sur la classification naturelle et la morphologie des lichens du Brésil ("Study on the natural classification and the morphology of the lichens of Brazil") in Latin with an introduction in French. This 526-page work dealt with 516 species, of which 240 were new to science. The Brazilian taxa were distributed amongst 78 genera (12 of which were described as new), the most well-represented of which included Lecidea (68 species), Graphis (43), Parmelia (39), Lecanora (33), Arthonia (25), and Buellia (19). The genus Cladonia was not included, as he reserved it for his monograph on the subject. Vainio discussed the general theory of lichens in the introduction of his work, supporting Simon Schwendener's then-controversial theory that lichens were the result of a symbiotic union between fungus and alga. Vainio advocated including the lichens in the general classification of the fungi. He argued that lichens are a polyphyletic group, with only one uniting characteristic—the symbiosis—distinguishing them from the ascomycetes and other fungi.

Vainio's work was intended to be a thesis submission for the post of associate professor at the University of Helsinki, a position he applied for in writing in the autumn of 1888. His early mentor Norrlin had obtained a similar position in 1878, which perhaps inspired Vainio to make the application. Because the department Chair, Sextus Otto Lindberg, did not trust his Finnish-language skills sufficiently to be able to judge the merits of Vainio's work, other opinions were sought, and so in addition to William Nylander, Theodor Magnus Fries and Johann Müller were recruited.

Most prominent contemporary lichenologists, including Müller and Nylander, disagreed with the so-called "Schwendenerian hypothesis" and the dual nature of lichens. Since they still subscribed to the belief that lichens were a plant group—rather than the fungus/alga symbiosis they are now known to be—they thought that Vainio's proposal to classify lichens with fungi was ridiculous. Müller in particular published two articles that were highly critical of Vainio's conclusions in Études Brésil. Vainio's relationship with Nylander had become strained since their successful collaborations years before. Nylander, in previous correspondence with Norrlin, expressed doubts about Vainio's decision to publish his early scientific works in Finnish instead of Latin, which was the norm in the international scientific community. He also questioned Lang's decision to change his name, writing "A most curious matter is also the disappearance of Mr Lang and the birth of Mr Wainio instead. This is a matter that may be possible and explainable in Finland (and unfortunate is that such is the situation) but in the common practical world, here in the logical humanity, such a thing is impossible even to mention without incurably injuring the person concerned." Vainio, in correspondence with Johann Müller in 1889, wrote "it is perhaps necessary that the knowledge of my thesis remains between us, because there are people who lay very peculiar intrigues to prevent me from the professorship. Nylander has taken a stand as a very unscrupulous enemy against me and has taken up a very scandalous intrigue".

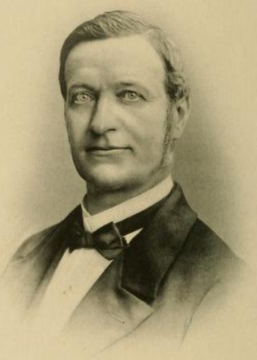
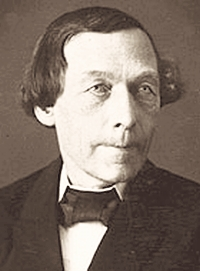
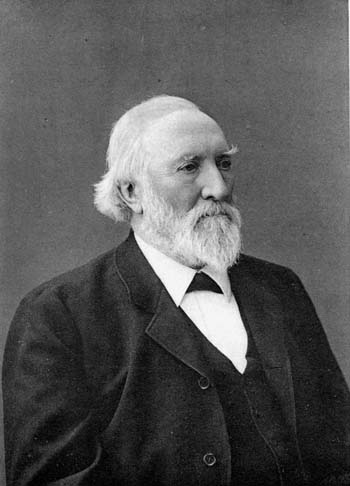
Johann Müller, William Nylander, and Theodor Magnus Fries were prominent botanists invited to comment on the merits of Vainio's research for his dissertation.

Nylander criticised and dismissed Vainio's thesis submission, arguing it had little scientific value. In contrast, Fries praised Vainio's work, and described him as one of the most competent contemporary lichenologists. Johann Müller disagreed with most of Vainio's general conclusions, and thought that chemical reactions, a characteristic that Vainio emphasised, have only a physiological, not taxonomical, value. Although Müller was public about his criticisms of Vainio's work, he did acknowledge his careful working method and anticipated that Vainio, "after return from wrong paths", would use his excellent observational skills in a systematically correct way in future research. German lichenologist Ferdinand Christian Gustav Arnold, who was present at Vainio's public thesis defence, introduced himself as a supporter of Schwendener's theory, and indicated that Vainio's work was the first to create a consistent system for classification.

Vainio did not receive the associate professorship for which he applied; the Department of Natural Sciences voted 4 to 3 against his application. Before an official announcement could even be drafted, Sextus Otto Lindberg died, leaving vacant the position of Professor of Botany. This gave Vainio the opportunity to apply for this job, for which he competed with the two other docents: Fredrik Elfving and Oswald Kairamo. The Department ranked him third in order of merit. Elfving was given the position; he later became known for his erroneous views on the nature of photobionts. Vainio's failure may have been because of his narrow, mainly lichen-focused field of expertise, his lack of teaching skills, and the personal resentments developed between Vainio and Nylander, as well as issues of language policy. Vainio championed Finnish interests and was a strong supporter of the Finnish language, but at that time Finland was still part of the Russian Empire and the position of the Finnish language in teaching was weak. Suspecting that he had been discriminated against in the selection of a professor, Vainio appealed the decision, arguing that the expert opinions came from representatives of an "openly hostile" school that was prejudiced towards him, and further, that he was the only one of the applicants with the ability to lecture fluently in both Finnish and Swedish. He concluded that he had been rejected on political rather than scientific grounds, writing that the university "had sunk from the level of a learned establishment to that of an institution governed more by political than by academic considerations". The university's position was that successful management of the professorship was more likely to be achieved by an applicant with a more general scientific background. Norwegian botanist Per Magnus Jørgensen suggests that not only did Vainio's support of Schwendener's theory cost him a position as professor, but probably also influenced the choice of author for the lichen section of Adolf Engler and Karl Anton Eugen Prantl's influential monograph series Das Pflanzenreich—a job awarded to the then relatively unknown Austrian lichenologist Alexander Zahlbruckner.

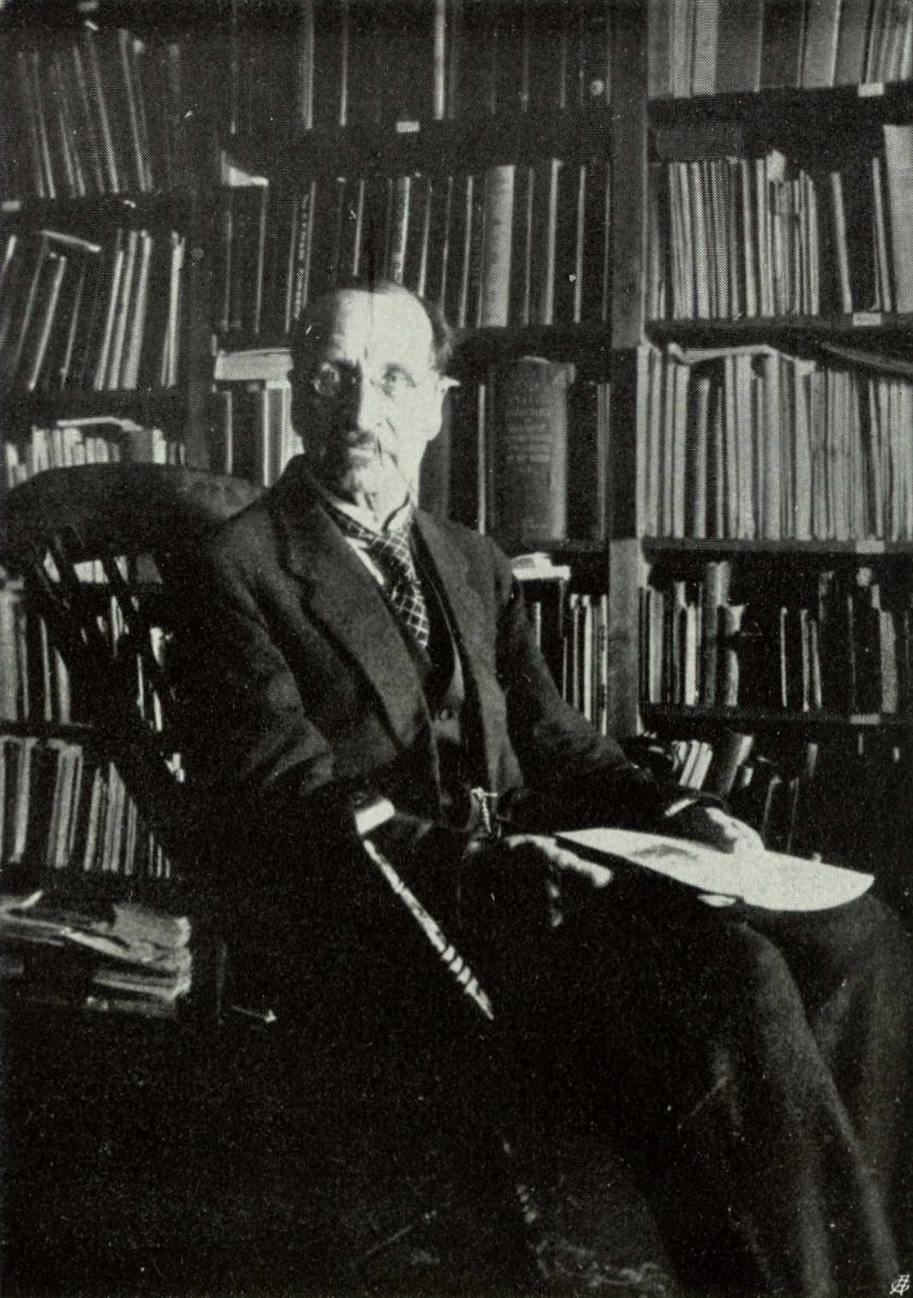
Vainio in his private study at the Plant Museum of the Turku University, 1925

Finnish historian Timo Tarmio suggests that Vainio's failure to secure a professorship must have been a further blow to him personally because, like Norrlin, his older brother Joel Napoleon Lang had successfully pursued a university career as a professor in the Faculty of Law. Unsuccessful in his bid for professorship, Vainio was convinced that a supporter of an independent Finland like him would never be elected to university duties. Faced with the reality of securing stable employment to provide for his wife and four children, Vainio accepted a job as a censor in the press service of Helsinki in 1891, a position in which he was appointed superintendent in 1901. It was during this time that the Russian Empire pursued the policy of Russification (a process in which non-Russian communities involuntarily or voluntarily give up their culture and language in favour of Russian culture), a mandate carried out by the polarising figure Governor-General Nikolay Bobrikov. His decision to work for the loathed Board of Press Censorship led to him becoming a pariah amongst his colleagues and compatriots. For example, despite their innovativeness and importance, Vainio's early publications on phytogeography in the border regions of northeast Finland and Russian Karelia were rarely cited by his Finnish colleagues, largely for political reasons. Another source suggests that resentment amongst his colleagues was stoked by his publication of the first Finnish-language dissertation. Although Vainio agonised over the social disapproval caused by his employment, he defiantly hid his distress.

Vainio lost the subsidy associated with his docentship in 1894. Shortly after the turn of the century, when Finland's constitutional struggle dominated the political landscape, students refused to enrol in his course as a form of protest against his chosen profession. Vainio was subsequently obliged to suspend his teaching position. With this background, Runar Collander has suggested that Vainio showed poor judgement in applying once more, in the spring of 1901, for the position of Associate Professor. The Department's response was unequivocal:

"An indispensable necessity for the successful progress of the work of the University is that it should be carried on in a spirit of free and independent inquiry. The system of preventative censorship, particularly in the form it has been taken lately, is completely contrary to this spirit. The University must accordingly avoid having any dealing with those concerned in applying it. So firm is the public conscience of the country on this point, that any compromise on the part of the University would have a damaging effect on its own reputation. Further proof of these feelings can be found in the fact that Dr. Wainio has been without pupils during the present term. The reply to Dr. Wainio's ... application can therefore only be that the Department's concern for the reputation of the University, and its conception of the ideals for which the University should stand, are in themselves sufficient grounds for asserting that the qualifications of Dr. Wainio, notwithstanding the value of his scientific writings, are not such as to justify the Department recommending him for the post of Associate Professor."

After Finland gained independence in 1917 and press censorship was terminated, Vainio was left without work and without a pension at the age of 64. Forced to live on modest savings, he continued his lichenological studies. Vainio transferred his microscope and part of his library to the botanical institution of the university, where he spent much of his time for the next couple of years.

=== University of Turku (1919–1928) ===
Vainio's fortunes improved in 1918, as the Turku Finnish University Society bought his herbarium collection of about 22,000 specimens for 60,000 FIM (equivalent to about €22,800 in 2020). (Note: Calculated using the currency converter on the Statistics Finland website, with a starting year of 1918, a comparison year of 2020, and a conversion amount of 60,000 FIM.) The society was organising a new university at Turku, which was then the second-largest city in Finland after Helsinki. Teaching and administration were to be wholly in the Finnish language, in contrast with the University of Helsinki, which taught both in Swedish and Finnish and used Swedish as the language of administration. The transaction was subject to the condition that Vainio himself would be responsible for organising and increasing the collection in museum condition, and would participate in teaching if necessary. As an ardent Finnish nationalist, Vainio was pleased with the arrangement and joined the payroll of the Turku University Society under the title of custodian of the collections of the Department of Botany in 1920, two years before the start of the university's teaching activities and the transfer of his collection to Turku. He moved to Turku and the university's main building on the edge of the market square in the former Phoenix Hotel when teaching began in 1922. Although only offered a modest yearly salary to organise the specimens, he carried out this task with great devotion. He obtained this job—his only permanent teaching position—at 69 years of age, and held it until his death. His living conditions, however, remained so modest that his wife and family were unable to visit him in Turku, and their visits were limited to his vacations in Helsinki. To optimize the productivity of his holiday time, he would take the evening train from Turku to Helsinki, and could be found the next morning in the lichen department of the Helsinki Plant Museum.

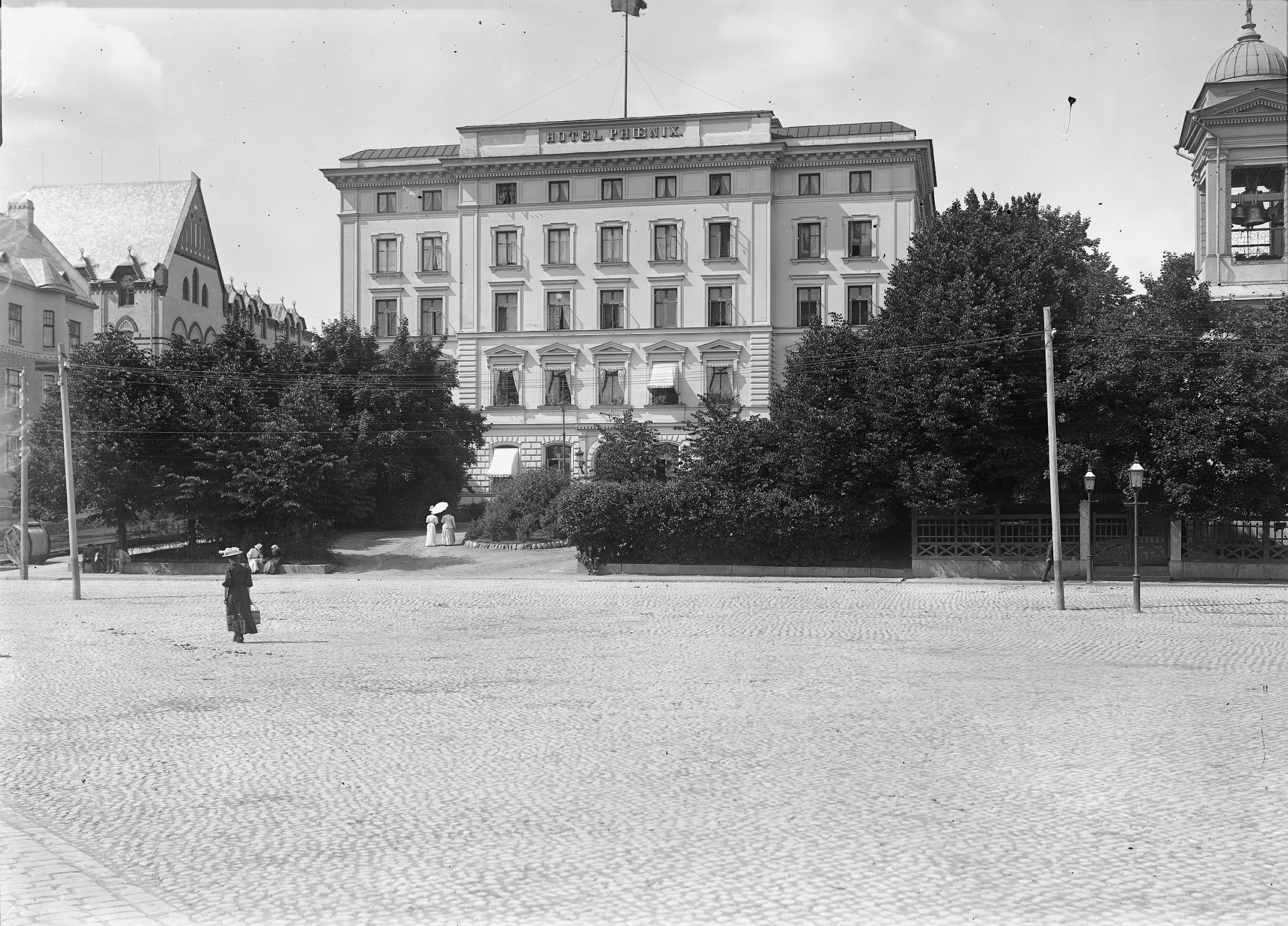
The Hotel Phoenix building, shown here in 1908, became the administrative centre for the University as well as Vainio's residence in Turku.

In 1921, he edited and distributed the exsiccata Nylander and Norrlin, herbarium lichenum Fenniae continuatio with Kaarlo Linkola. The same year, at the instigation of Alvar Palmgren, Vainio was commissioned by the Societas pro Fauna et Flora Fennica to continue work on Lichenographia Fennica, a seven-part book series about Finnish lichens. Vainio had already published the first volume dealing with "Pyrenolichens" in 1921. Knowing that because of his age he had only limited time left to complete a multi-volume series, he started work on the harder groups, confident that in the event of his death the easier groups could be handled by other researchers. This book series became an important resource for the study of the lichen flora of all Northern Europe.

Starting in 1922, Vainio taught as an assistant professor at the University of Turku, and headed the cryptogamic herbarium at the university. His teaching consisted of courses in plant systematics, and organised field trips with students. This field work he continued until 1927, leading a class expedition to a small island in Lake Ladoga. During his time at the University of Turku, the collections expanded to 35,000 samples, a result of additions from local excursions, and collections sent from abroad. Vainio also advised Kaarlo Linkola and Veli Räsänen, two of his younger colleagues. He was granted a state pension in recognition of his services to science (on the recommendation of the University of Turku and the Societas pro Fauna et Flora Fennica) while on his deathbed.

Vainio's final work, the fourth volume of the Lichenographia Fennica, was left uncompleted on his worktable because of his death. His last entry was to name and describe Lecidea keimioeënsis (collected by Linkola in Keimiötunturi) as a new species, when his illness suddenly forced him to stop work and hurry to the hospital. Started by Vainio in 1924, the fourth volume was completed posthumously by Norwegian lichenologist Bernt Lynge in 1934.

== Personal life and character ==
Vainio married Marie Louise Scolastique Pérottin, the daughter of a French official, in 1891. They had five children together. His eldest son, with whom he had a close relationship, was the Scout leader and painter Charles Edouard Ilmari (1892–1955). The walls of the elder Vainio's Turku University office were adorned with portraits of prominent lichenologists that were painted by his son. His other children were Marie Marcienne Alice (1894–1979); Louise (born and died in 1896); Irja Louise Mercedes (1899–1976); and Ahti Victor August (1902–1958). Magnusson described him as "a person of retiring habits contented with the bare necessities of life" in his obituary. He recalled the occasion of Vainio's 70th birthday party, where he was visited in his home by a group of colleagues from the University of Turku. Although Vainio seemed to be uncomfortable with the attention, he was always willing to draw on his extensive knowledge and impressive memory to give advice and information to inquiring lichenologists.

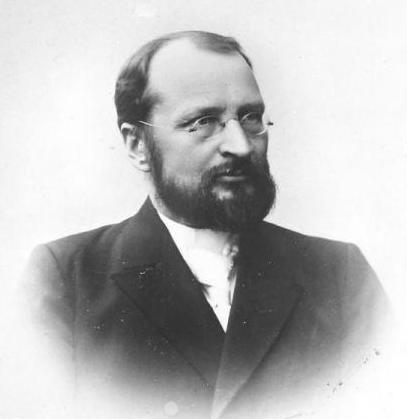
Edvard Vainio

Regarding his character, his colleague Kaarlo Linkola noted that "he appeared an extremely friendly and helpful, though reserved old man, and also a very eccentric personality, with many peculiar features, some of which greatly contributed to his difficult, even tragic life", further noting that "he was extremely obstinate, and he was absolutely unwilling to withdraw from a step which he had once taken". Vainio was dedicated to his research, and could be found working at all hours, even on public holidays. Linkola indicates that he had not taken a day of rest for decades, even when sick. Other biologists in Turku referred to "Vainio's lighthouse", as lamplight would often be seen emerging, often well past midnight, from the windows of his small room in the old university building in Turku.

Vainio was a patriot and proponent of Finnish nationalism. He supported Finnish interests, language, and culture against both the long traditional Swedishness or the attempted Russification of his country by Russian rulers. In the 1870s he was involved with pro-Finnish student activism. He was one of the first to replace his non-Finnish name with a Finnish one, Wainio. The name—which means "field"—was taken from a village in Hollola of the same name. He later changed this to the modern Finnish spelling Vainio in 1921, in accordance with contemporary changes in Finnish orthography.

Vainio was generally healthy for most of his life, but near the end he suffered from severe nephralgia (pain in the kidney) and spent his final three weeks in the hospital of Turku. He died on 14 May 1929, at age 75. He is said to have expressed two great regrets before his death: his uncompleted Lichenographia Fennica manuscript, and the infrequency with which he saw his children after his move to Turku.

== Legacy ==
Vainio formally described more than 1900 species, circumscribed several new genera, and emended several existing ones. He published 102 scientific works in his career, comprising a total of about 5500 pages. Although most of his work dealt with lichens, he occasionally published on related topics. Examples include a discussion of willow hybrids, a listing of seed plants in Finnish Lapland, a list of the cryptogams and mosses from the area of the Konda river in Western Siberia, and the plant and cryptogam floras of Hämeenlinna and the northern Finland and Russian Karelia border area. In this latter work, Vainio distinguished in his study area ten regions on the basis of floristic characteristics and phytogeographical features. In discussing the eastern boundary of the Finnish flora area bordering Russian Karelia, he concluded that the county of Paanajärvi floristically resembled Russian Karelia so much that it should be combined with Russian Karelia. Later floristic researchers of this region have used Vainio's pioneering work for the biogeographical division of Eastern Fennoscandia with few revisions. Finnish-speaking experts had admired Vainio's dissertation, but his international reputation as a prominent lichenologist was first established by his floristic treatment of the lichens collected during these trips documented in the Adjumenta, published in Latin in 1881 and 1883.

Vainio described and catalogued lichen collections from all over the world, including the Arctic (Greenland) and Antarctica. Finnish botanist Reino Alava, who was a curator of the University of Turku herbarium, compiled a comprehensive listing of the location of all of Vainio's type specimens in a 1988 publication, and, twenty years later, a list of all collectors whose collections are represented in Vainio's lichen herbarium in Turku. As a consequence of Vainio's pioneering works on Brazilian lichenology and his extensive collecting in Caraça, this location, now part of the protected Parque Natural do Caraça, has since become an international hub for lichenology and a destination for pilgrimages by lichenologists. His 1890 Étude earned him the reputation of an expert in tropical lichens, which was later bolstered by his publications about lichens in the Philippines, the Caribbean, and Tropical Africa and Asia. Vainio is generally considered to have made the most important contributions to the study of foliose lichens in the neotropics before the work of Rolf Santesson in the 1940s.

Vainio's idea of integrating the classification of lichens and fungi represented a criticism of the prevailing ideas of 19th-century lichenology. These ideas would persist into the first half of the 20th century, largely due to the publication of Zahlbruckner's influential Catalogus series, issued in ten volumes from 1922 up until 1940, which was based on these old views. Although the ideal classification scheme would place lichen genera near their closest non-lichenized fungal relatives, with the limited information Vainio had available the solution he devised was to designate lichens and ascomycetes to one group and place the lichens in separate classes, the Discolichenes and Pyrenolichenes. It was at the International Botanical Congress in Stockholm in 1950 that Rolf Santesson advocated for Vainio's ideas and presented an integrated classification for fungi and lichens based on an updated system developed by John Axel Nannfeldt. This initiated discussions and an eventual consensus for an integrated classification system. By 1981, lichens were no longer recognised as a "group" distinct from fungi in the International Code of Botanical Nomenclature.

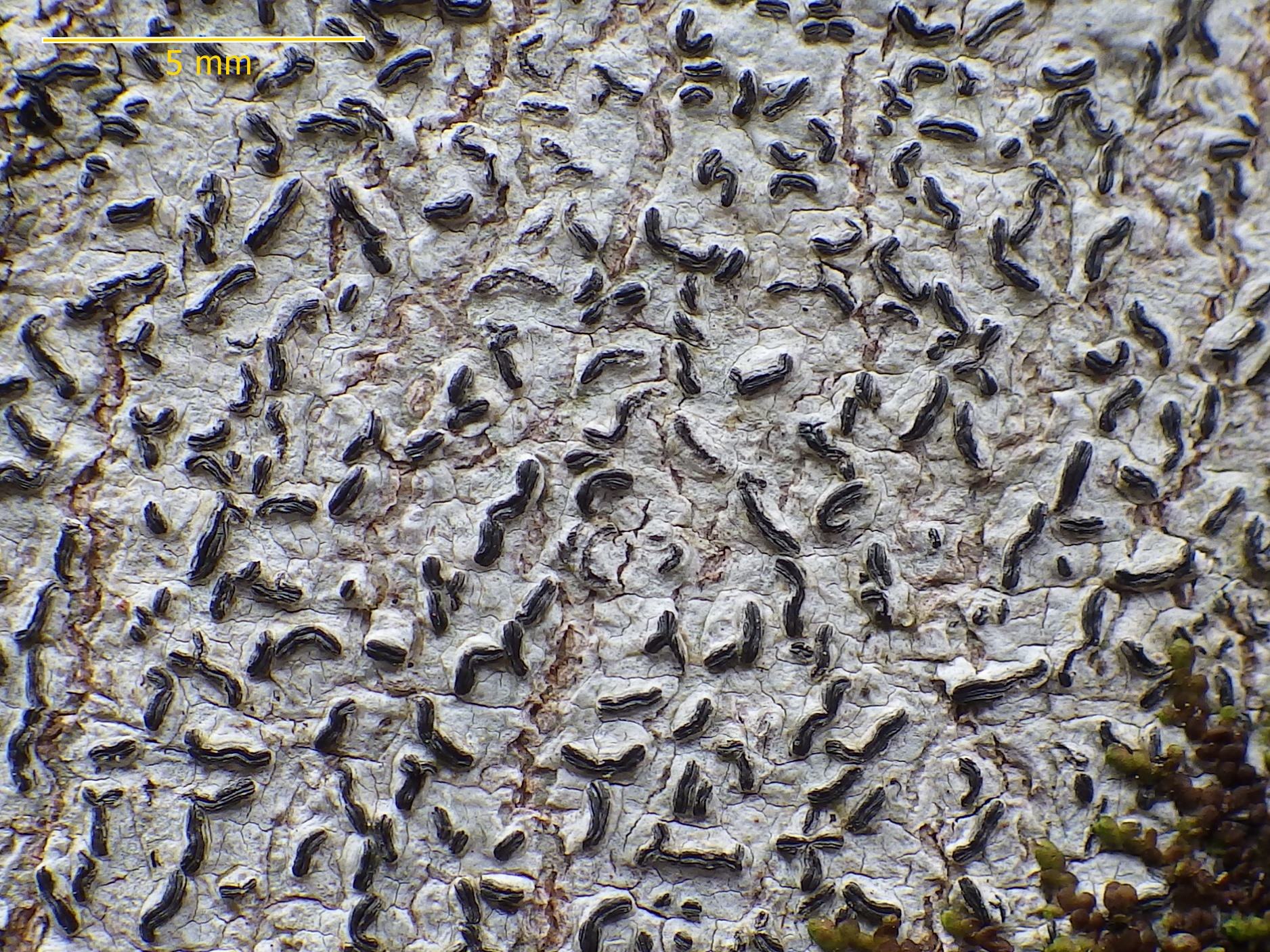
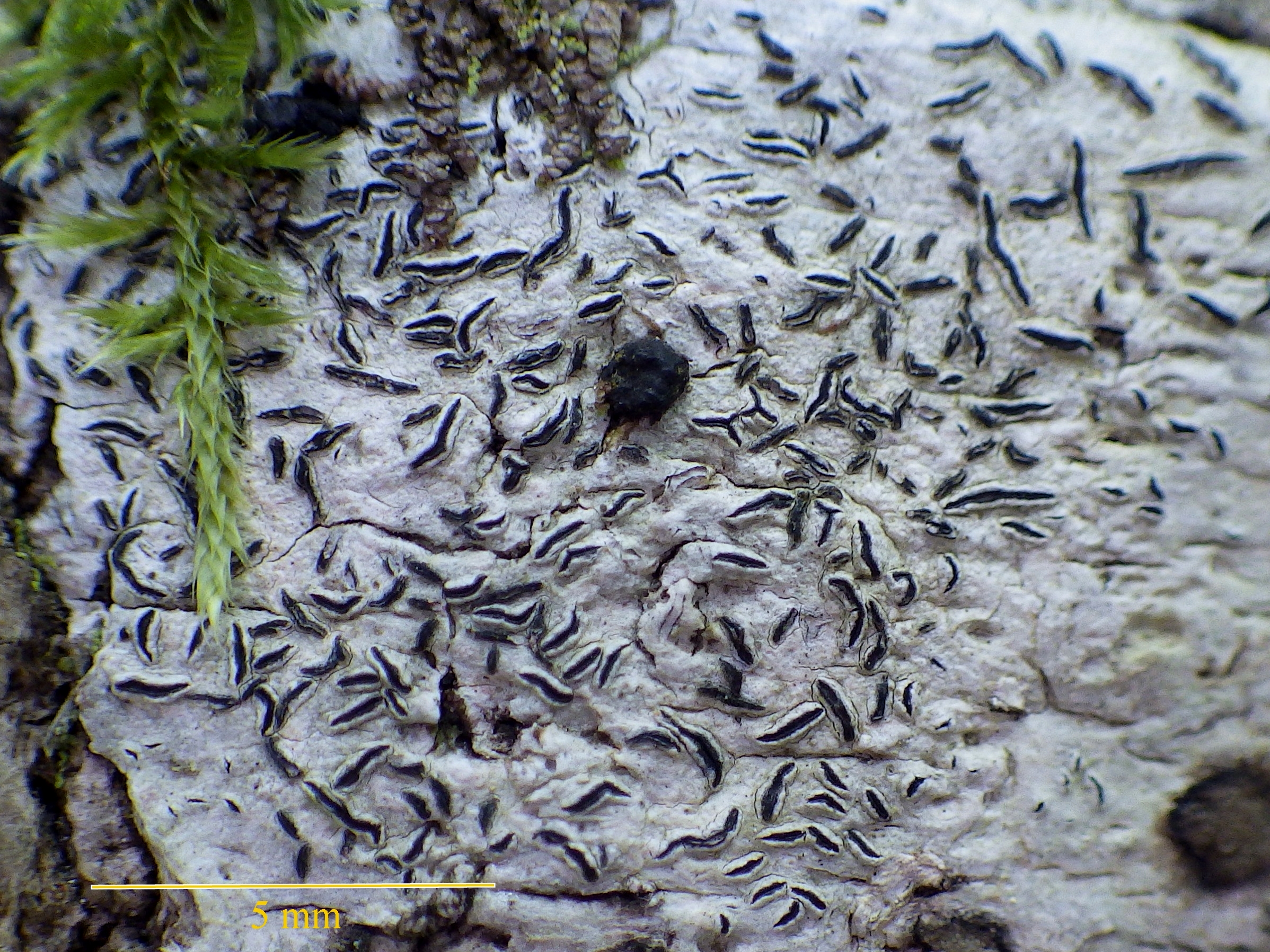
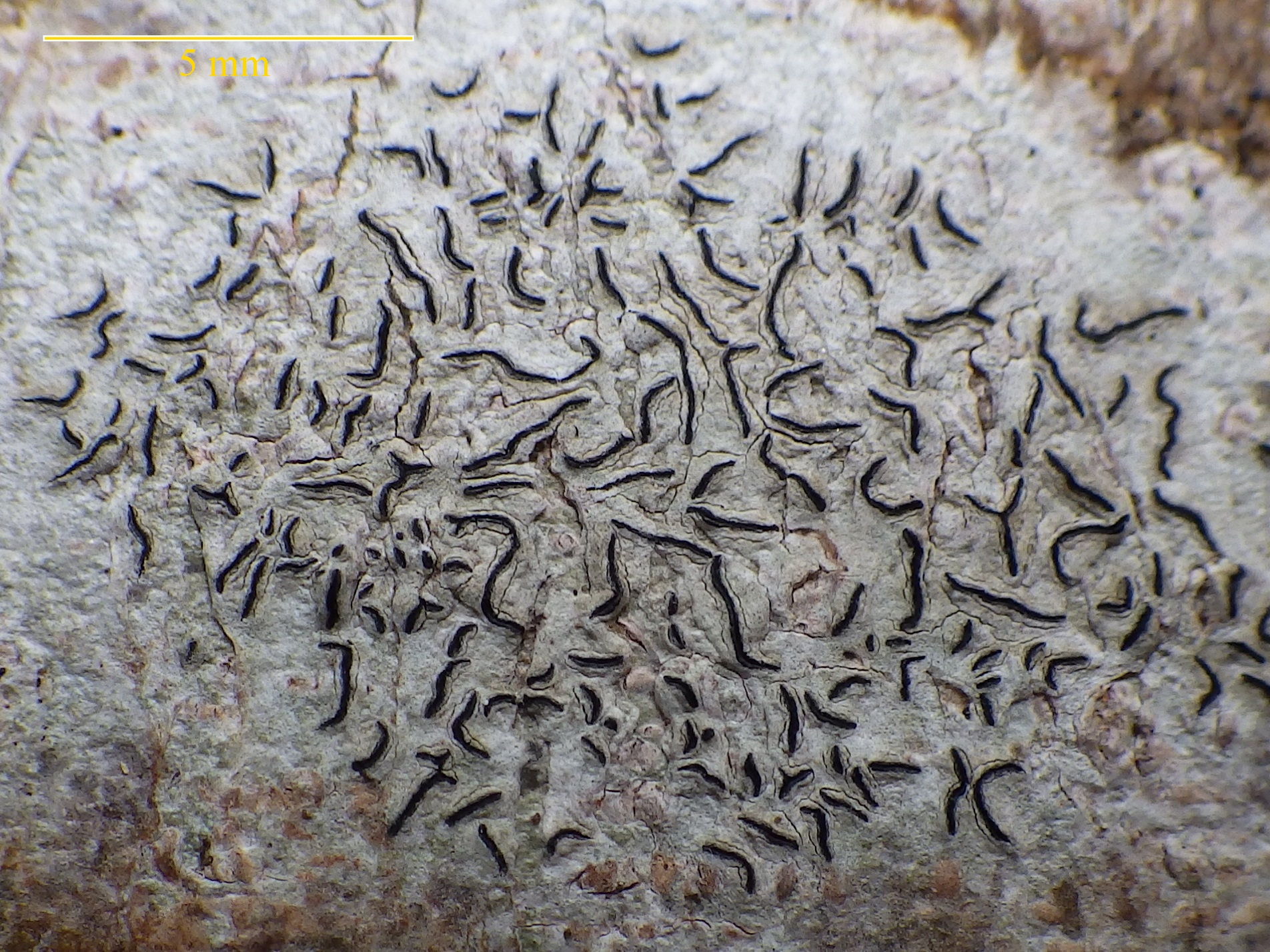
Some of the script lichen species Vainio described as new to science include Allographa leptospora (top), Graphis crebra (middle) and Graphis plumierae (bottom).

Vainio made several important contributions to the understanding of the lichen family Parmeliaceae. He provided the taxonomical foundation for the northern European species of the difficult genus Usnea. His subdivision of the genus Parmelia laid the nomenclatural cornerstone for two later recognised genera, Hypotrachyna and Xanthoparmelia (raised to generic status by Mason Hale), as well as for Allantoparmelia, which was promoted to a genus by Theodore Esslinger. By describing the section Amphigymnia of the genus Parmelia, Vainio, in his treatment of Brazilian lichens (1890), had an essential role in the separation of species that are now part of the genus Parmotrema. In the family Lobariaceae, Vainio segregated the genus Pseudocyphellaria for species having pseudocyphellae and not true cyphellae on the lower surface of the thallus. This was a radical idea at the time, as the presence or absence of cyphellae and pseudocyphellae were not considered to be suitable as taxonomic and generic characters. Although some other influential lichenologists took a conservative view and lumped Pseudocyphellaria with Sticta (such as Zahlbruckner in his Catalogus Lichenum Universalis), Vainio's concept of the genus prevailed and has been used extensively for over a century. Later work has shown the presence of pseudocyphellae to correlate strongly with a diverse secondary chemistry consisting of orcinol derivatives, beta-orcinol derivatives, triterpenoids, terphenylquinones and 4-ylidenetetronic acids; the genus Sticta, in contrast, does not produce these compounds. Vainio also introduced in this same work the current concept for the genus Lobaria, which at the time was broadly used for foliose lichens.

== Recognition ==
In his 1931 memorial address, Alvar Palmgren, then President of the Societas pro Fauna et Flora Fennica, recalled that many of Vainio's scientific papers appeared in the Society's publications and were among the best of them. Vainio's travels in Brazil were recounted in Reinio Alava's 1986 book Edvard August Vainio's Journey to Brazil in 1885 and his Lichenes Brasilienses Exsiccati. Based on Vainio's diaries, it describes the difficulties he experienced in collecting in a tropical foreign country. Alava, along with his coauthors Unto Laine and Seppo Huhtinen, published a book in 2004 describing Vainio's collecting trips to Finnish and Russian Karelia and to Finnish Lapland.

Vainio's three-volume Cladonia monograph was reprinted in 1978. Although at the time of reprinting some parts of the book were quite outdated, a review noted "[I]t is no ordinary monograph, but one which has a long-standing value as a taxonomic, floristic, and bibliographic source. One of its outstanding features is its almost infallible reliability as a nomenclatural source", and that "For many significant details on the world's Cladonias, Vainio still gives the freshest information!"

In 1997, a symposium on Vainio and his work was organised in Brazil by the Grupo Latino-Americano de Liquenólogos (Latin-American Group of Lichenologists) and the International Association for Lichenology. One of the major aims of the conference was to collect topotypes (Note: A topotype is a specimen from the type locality, and whose phenotypic characteristics are the same as those of the type.) for species that Vainio described. The conference was held at the Caraça Monastery (by that time a hotel) that Vainio had stayed at during his collecting trip there more than a century earlier. At the conference, Vainio was declared the "Father of Brazilian lichenology" by the participants. A portrait of Vainio, donated by the University of Turku, was mounted in one of the main corridors. A book containing the proceedings of the symposium was issued in 1998, Recollecting Edvard August Vainio. Written by several specialists on various lichen groups, it reviews his contributions to tropical lichenography, and gives biographic details about him and his travels, publications, and collections. He is known as the "Grand Old Man of lichenology", a sobriquet originally given to him by Bernt Lynge: "Through all of his papers Dr. Vainio has acquired an uncontested position as the Grand Old Man of Lichenology. He is an ornament to his science and an honour to his country." (Note: Finnish: "Kaikilla näillä teoksillaan on toht. Vainio hankkinut itselleen jäkälätieteen Grand old man'in riidattoman aseman. Hän on tieteensä kaunistus ja kunniaksi maallensa.") Because of his significant contributions to the knowledge of the family Graphidaceae in the Philippines, he has also been called the "Father of Philippine lichenology". Vainio has been used as an example of a "universal lichen taxonomist", defined as "characterised by a broad knowledge in lichen taxonomy, prolificacy and efficiency in publishing their studies, usually in sole authorship, and distribution of knowledge via exsiccata rather than teaching or having students." In his survey of influential lichenologists, Ingvar Kärnefelt called him "one of the most outstanding lichen taxonomists ever".

=== Eponymy ===
Five genera are named after Vainio, although most of these eponyms are now obsolete:

- Vainiona Werner (1943) (= Cercidospora)
- Vainionia Räsänen (1943) (= Calicium)
- Vainionora Kalb (1991)
- Wainioa Nieuwl. (1916) (= Byssoloma)
- Wainiocora Tomas. (1950) (= Cora)

Many species have also been named to honour Vainio. These include: Teichospora wainioi P.Karst. (1884); Nectriella vainioi P.Karst. (1889); Meliola wainioi Pat. (1890); Filaspora wainionis Kuntze (1898); Clathroporina wainiana Zahlbr. (1902); Cladonia wainioi Savicz (1914); Physcia wainioi Räsänen (1921); Opegrapha wainioi Zahlbr. (1923); Pannaria wainioi Zahlbr. (1925); Rhizocarpon vainioense Lynge (1926); Peltigera vainioi Gyeln. (1929); Pannaria vainioi C.W.Dodge (1933); Usnea vainioi Motyka (1936); Nesolechia vainioana Räsänen (1939); Calicium vainioanum Nádv. (1940); Melanotheca vainioensis Werner (1944); Lecidea vainioi H.Magn. (1949); Tricharia vainioi R.Sant. (1952); Candelariella vainioana Hakul. (1954); Caloplaca vainioi Hafellner & Poelt (1979); Lecanora vainioi Vänskä (1986); Gyalideopsis vainioi Kalb & Vězda (1988); Bulbothrix vainioi Jungbluth, Marcelli & Elix (2008); Hypotrachyna vainioi Sipman, Elix & T.H.Nash (2009); Coppinsidea vainioana S.Y.Kondr., E.Farkas & L.Lőkös (2019); and Verrucaria vainioi Pykälä & Myllys (2024).

== Selected publications ==
A complete listing of Vainio's scientific publications is given in Schulz-Korth's 1930 Hedwigia obituary, and on the University of Turku's Museum of Natural Science webpage. Vainio's major works include:

- Wainio, Edvard August (1887). Monographia Cladoniarum universalis: I. Acta Societatis pro Fauna et Flora Fennica. Vol. 4. pp. 1–509.
- —————————— (1890). Étude sur la classification naturelle et la morphologie des Lichens du Brésil, I–II. Acta Societatis pro Fauna et Flora Fennica (in French and Latin). Vol. 7. Helsinki: J. Simelius. pp. 1–247, 1–256.
- —————————— (1894). Monographia Cladoniarum universalis: II. Acta Societatis pro Fauna et Flora Fennica. Vol. 10. pp. 1–499.
- —————————— (1897). Monographia Cladoniarum universalis: III. Acta Societatis pro Fauna et Flora Fennica. Vol. 14. pp. 1–268.
- Vainio, E. (1909). "Lichenes in viciniis stationis hibernae expeditionis Vegae prope pagum Pitlekai in Sibiria septentrionali a D:re E. Almquist collecti". Arkiv för Botanik (in Latin). 8 (4): 11–175.
- —————————— (1909). "Lichenes insularum Philippinarum. I." The Philippine Journal of Science. 4 (5): 651–662.
- —————————— (1913). "Lichenes insularum Philippinarum. II". The Philippine Journal of Science. 8 (2): 99–137.
- —————————— (1921). "Lichenes insularum Philippinarum. III". Annales Academiae Scientiarum Fennicae Series A. 15 (6): 1–368.
- —————————— (1921). Lichenographia Fennica I. Pyrenolichenes iisque proximi Pyrenomycetes et Lichenes imperfecti. Acta Societatis pro Fauna et Flora Fennica. Vol. 49. pp. 1–274.
- —————————— (1922). Lichenographia Fennica II. Acta Societatis pro Fauna et Flora Fennica. Vol. 51. pp. 1–340.
- —————————— (1923). "Lichenes insularum Philippinarum. IV". Annales Academiae Scientiarum Fennicae Series A. 19 (15): 1–84.
- —————————— (1927). "Lichenographia Fennica III. Coniocarpaceae" (PDF). Acta Societatis Pro Fauna et Flora Fennica. 57 (1): 1–138.
- —————————— (1934). "Lichenographia Fennica IV. Lecideales 2" (PDF). Acta Societatis Pro Fauna et Flora Fennica. 57 (2): 1–531.
