= Palmgren =

Palmgren is a Swedish-language surname.

== Geographical distribution ==
As of 2014, 59.1% of all known bearers of the surname Palmgren were residents of Sweden (frequency 1:4,096), 21.0% of the United States (1:423,011), 11.0% of Finland (1:12,325), 2.4% of Denmark (1:58,191) and 2.2% of Norway (1:57,779).

In Sweden, the frequency of the surname was higher than national average (1:4,096) in the following counties:

1. Gotland County (1:1,671)
2. Blekinge County (1:1,769)
3. Östergötland County (1:2,074)
4. Jönköping County (1:2,457)
5. Kalmar County (1:2,542)
6. Norrbotten County (1:3,059)
7. Halland County (1:3,360)
8. Södermanland County (1:3,723)
9. Stockholm County (1:3,777)

In Finland, the frequency of the surname was higher than national average (1:12,325) in the following regions:

1. Uusimaa (1:6,016)
2. Central Ostrobothnia (1:6,687)
3. Lapland (1:7,220)
4. Åland (1:10,764)
5. Kymenlaakso (1:12,207)

== People ==
- Alvar Palmgren (1880–1960), Finnish botanist
- Aurore Palmgren (1880–1961), Swedish film actress
- Axel Palmgren (1867–1939), Finnish lawyer and politician
- Eric Palmgren (1916–2015), Finnish Olympic sailor
- Gunnar Jedeur-Palmgren
- Jayson Palmgren (b. 1989)
- Maikki Järnefelt-Palmgren (1871–1929), Finnish opera singer
- Maria Jonae Palmgren (1630–1708), Swedish scholar
- Niclas Palmgren (born 1970), Swedish politician
- Pontus Palmgren (1907–1993), Finnish zoologist
- Raoul Palmgren (1912–1995), Finnish writer
- Roger Palmgren, Swedish football manager
- Selim Gustaf Adolf Palmgren (1878–1951), Finnish composer, pianist, and conductor
- Valfrid Palmgren (1877–1967), Swedish politician; one of the first female members of the Stockholm City Council and a reformer of the public libraries.

== Palmgreen ==
- Karl Palmgreen
