= Lecidea keimioeensis =

Scientific classification
- Domain: Eukaryota
- Kingdom: Fungi
- Division: Ascomycota
- Class: Lecanoromycetes
- Order: Lecideales
- Family: Lecideaceae
- Genus: Lecidea
- Species: L. keimioeensis

Binomial name
- Lecidea keimioeensis Vain. (1934)

Species of lichen

Lecidea keimioeensis (originally published as keimioeënsis) is a species of crustose lichen. It was collected by Finnish botanist Kaarlo Linkola from Keimiötunturi, Finland, (for which the species is named), and identified as a new species by Edvard August Vainio. This species was the last one described by Vainio before he had to go to the hospital for a sudden illness, where he died two weeks later. Since its original publication, it has scarcely been reported in the scientific literature. In a 1997 assessment report about the inclusion criteria for a Finnish Regional Red List, the species was described as an example of "probably curiosities known to only one researcher".

== See also ==
- List of Lecidea species
