= Kaarlo Linkola =

Finnish botanist and phytogeographer

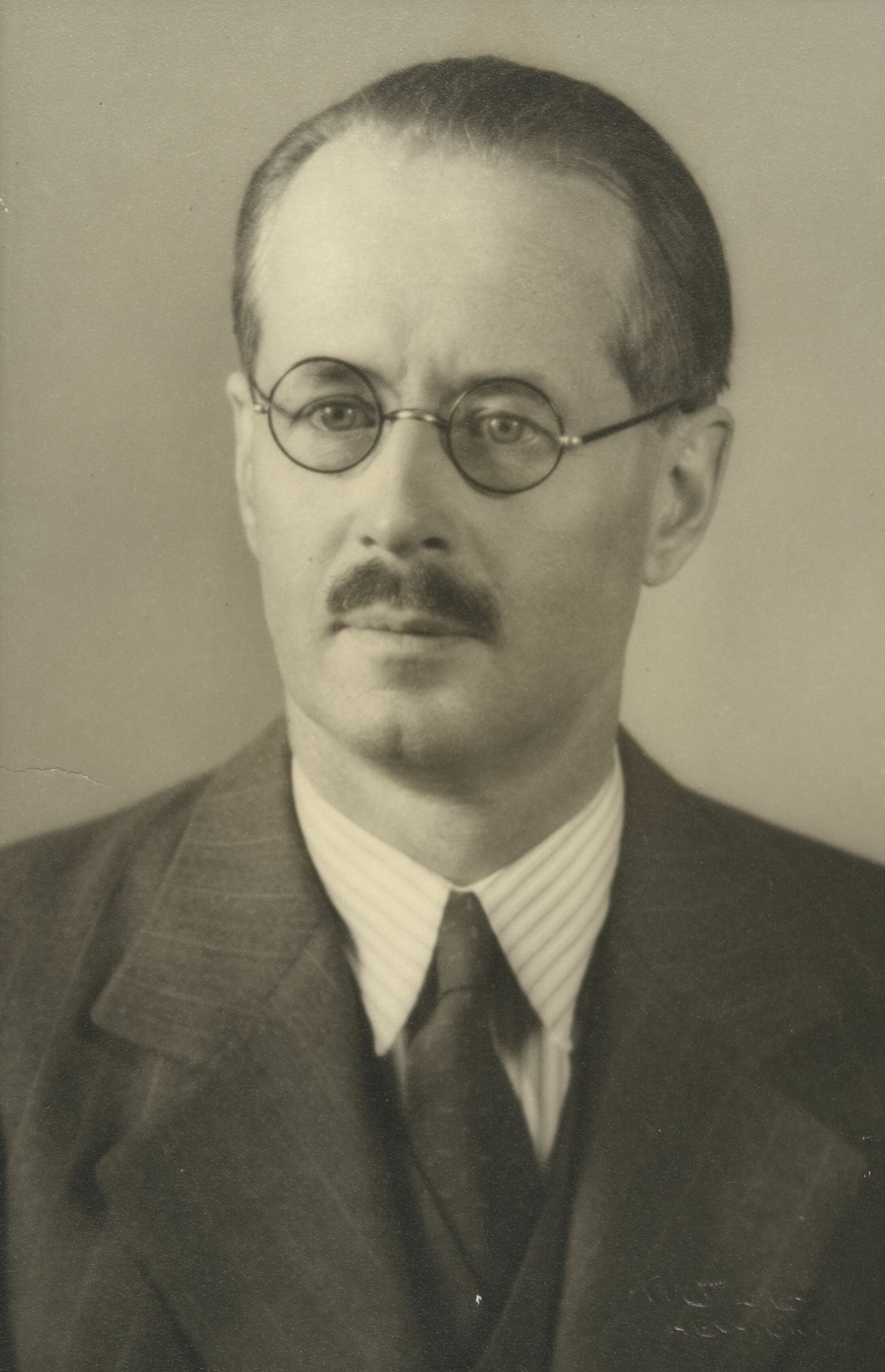
- Rector Kaarlo Linkola
- Born: 6 June 1888; Joensuu, Finland
- Died: 26 April 1942 (aged 53); Helsinki, Finland
- Education: University of Helsinki
- Scientific career
- Fields: botany, plant ecology
- Workplaces: University of Helsinki
- Author abbrev. (botany): Linkola

Kaarlo Linkola (surname until 1906 Collan; 1888–1942) was a Finnish botanist and phytogeographer.

Linkola was a docent of botany at Helsinki University from 1919 to 1922. He was a professor of botany at the University of Turku from 1922 and at Helsinki University from 1925 (in a newly established second chair of botany). He was head of the botanical institute from 1926, dean of the Faculty of Science for two periods (1930–1933 and 1936–1938), and rector of Helsinki University from 1938 to 1941.

Linkola was made an honorary member of the Botanical Society of Denmark in 1940.

In 1921, he edited and distributed the exsiccata Nylander and Norrlin, herbarium lichenum Fenniae continuatio with Edvard August Vainio.

Linkola's doctoral dissertation (1916) dealt with the impact of culture of vegetation in Southern Karelia. Much later, Ilkka Hanski used Linkola's data on plants associated with villages isolated in the boreal forest landscape matrix to illustrate his core-satellite species hypothesis.

Linkola made a unique contribution to the understanding of regeneration in herbaceous plant communities in studying the natural occurrence of seedlings in meadows and on cliffs.

Linkola and his students made a suite of investigations of root architecture. These studies are amongst the earliest in a still oft-neglected field. The last of these reports was published quite a while after Linkola's early death.

Kaarlo Linkola was a member of the Finnish Academy of Science and Letters. He co-founded the Finnish Union for Nature Protection and was its first chairman. He was the father of Pentti Linkola. He is buried in the Hietaniemi Cemetery in Helsinki.

The lichen species Verrucaria linkolae Pykälä & Myllys (2024) is named in his honour.

== Sources ==
- Bo-Jungar Wikgren: "Pages of the History of Biology in Finland"
