= C. B. Williams =

English entomologist and ecologist

Carrington Bonsor Williams FRS (7 October 1889 – 12 July 1981) better known as C. B. Williams or just "C.B." to friends, was an English entomologist and ecologist. He contributed to studies on insect migration, statistical approaches to ecology and biogeography.

== Early life ==
Born to Alfred Williams, a banker and Lillian Bonsor Williams (née Kirkland), he grew up in Liverpool and was not drawn to scientific interests by his parents, though he had access to books on natural history and kept an aquarium. He studied at a preparatory school in Cheshire and later at Birkenhead School from 1903 to 1908.

Around 1897 the family moved to the Cheshire coast where there were open fields. At the age of twelve, during a summer in Beddgelert he and his sister were introduced to the world of caterpillars by a local doctor. They were later taken to a meeting of the Lancashire and Cheshire Entomological Society. Williams' name was put for membership and he was duly elected, although he learnt later that the members thought they were voting for his father.

== Career ==
He got a scholarship to Clare College, Cambridge University where his interests were in biology and he obtained a Diploma of Agriculture and a B.A. in 1911. He came in contact with William Bateson who was then studying caterpillars and had been appointed director of the John Innes Horticultural Institution, where Williams got a research studentship in applied entomology, working there for the next five years. He also visited the United States during this period, looking at agricultural entomology and meeting people such as T. H. Morgan, a close associate of Bateson. Williams worked during this period on the Thysanoptera, their biology and systematics and, along with J. D. Hood, described some new species.

During World War I he trained in the London School of Tropical Medicine, to assist the Royal Army Medical Corps in identifying pathogenic bacteria and spent most of his time in that unheroic branch of warfare, examining the stools of dysentery patients. He was then called to study a pest of sugar cane in the West Indies, Tomaspis saccharina which was threatening sugar supplies to Britain. Williams worked in Trinidad 1916-1921 where he was to implement a plan made by J. C. Kershaw in 1913 to introduce a parasite.

While in the West Indies he saw his first migration of butterflies in British Guiana. There were thousands of yellow Pierids and they flew every day for a fortnight. He became very interested in the phenomenon.

In 1920 he married Ellen Margaret Bain, the daughter of a British West Indian planter, John Purdie Bain and his wife Mary Rebecca Olton. Williams dedicated his book on Patterns in the balance of nature to his wife in gratitude for her wisdom in the art of living. They had three sons.

In 1921 Williams returned to England and here he accepted a post in the Entomological Section of Egypt’s Ministry of Agriculture. His work in Egypt was mostly administrative but he was able to study some further aspects of insect migration as they applied to economic entomology. In 1927 he moved to Amani, Tanganyika as government entomologist. His first job was to oversee the laying of a road and two bridges, about which he said I then felt how valuable a good training in entomology can be.

In Amani he again had occasion to study butterfly migration and in the second year he was able to study a locust invasion which managed to bring trains to a standstill. In 1929 he went home on leave with the intention of returning to East Africa but he accepted the offer of the Steven lectureship in Agricultural and Forest Entomology in the University of Edinburgh. In 1930 he obtained his Sc.D. in 1930 from Cambridge University with a thesis on "Migration of Butterflies" In Africa, Williams met Reginald Ernest Moreau, who was an accountant in Egypt with an interest in birds. He introduced Moreau into scientific techniques and helped his transfer to Amani. Moreau later became a pioneer who developed theories on life-history, influencing David Lack with his studies on clutch size in birds. From 1945 to 1946 Williams was President of the Association of Applied Biologists.

== Insect migration ==
The study of butterfly migration was a passion for C. B. Williams. He made uncountable observations himself during his years in the Tropics and he had colleagues all over the world making new observations. He analysed and published the results in a long series of publications and became a world-leading authority on the subject. Through his research, he was able to shed light on many of the problems, which he had first formulated in his 1930 thesis. He published a much enhanced account on the subject in 1958.

== Statistical ecology ==
From 1932 to 1955, he headed the entomology department at the Rothamsted Experimental Station. When he joined the staff in 1932, Sir John Russell was the director. Russell had earlier invited R. A. Fisher and Williams was able to study quantitative aspects of insect populations. Williams became one of the pioneers of the statistical study of biodiversity patterns. For example, he showed that Charles Elton's observation that the species-to-genus ratio was lower on islands than on mainlands could be expected from chance alone and hence that Elton's interpretation (competitive exclusion) was redundant (which had already been shown three decades earlier by Alvar Palmgren and Arthur Maillefer). In his 1964 book, "Patterns in the Balance of Nature", Williams gave a still valuable overview of this discipline.

With Fisher, Williams was able to establish patterns in the diversity and numbers of insects caught in light traps. He noticed that logarithmic patterns were widespread, an idea which was later developed by other ecologists like Frank W. Preston. Williams used this pattern to predict the number of head lice on people using data on counts of lice from prisoners in a South Indian jail. Williams calculated that the number of persons with only one louse must be 107 and the actual was 106 and he wrote so Nature was only one wrong.

He continued to work after his retirement on many aspects of insect ecology.

== Miscellaneous ==
C. B. Williams served as president of several learned societies, e.g. the Association of Applied Biologists, the British Ecological Society and of the Royal Entomological Society of London. In 1954, C. B. Williams was made a fellow of the Royal Society.
