= Usnea vainioi =

Scientific classification
- Domain: Eukaryota
- Kingdom: Fungi
- Division: Ascomycota
- Class: Lecanoromycetes
- Order: Lecanorales
- Family: Parmeliaceae
- Genus: Usnea
- Species: U. vainioi

Binomial name
- Usnea vainioi Motyka (1936)

Species of lichen

Usnea vainioi is a rare species of beard lichen in the family Parmeliaceae found in the southeastern United States. It was described as a new species in 1936 by Polish lichenologist Józef Motyka. The specific epithet honours Finnish lichenologist Edvard August Vainio. The lichen contains (in addition to usnic acid) diffractaic acid as the main secondary compound.

Usnea vainioi grows in clusters or tufts, sometimes hanging from its substrate by a single holdfast, and is up to 12 cm (4.7 in) long. Its lateral branches are up to 8 cm (3.1 in) long, although they more typically are in the range 3 to 5 cm (1.2 to 2.0 in). The cortex is green, while the medulla, which has a central cavity, is more variable in color – typically red and white with tinges of yellow.

Because the type collection of Usnea vainioi was a mixed collection containing thalli both with and without soredia, a sorediate thallus was selected as the lectotype of the species by Roderick Rogers and G. Nell Stevens in a 1988 publication.
