= Johan Petter Norrlin =

Finnish botanist (1842–1917)

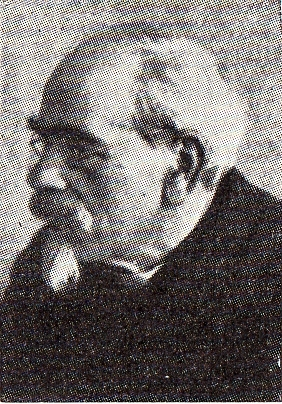
- Born: 6 July 1842; Hollola, Finland
- Died: 7 January 1917 (aged 74); Helsinki, Grand Duchy of Finland, Russian Empire
- Scientific career
- Fields: Botany; phytogeography
- Workplaces: University of Finland
- Doctoral students: Alvar Palmgren
- Author abbrev. (botany): Norrl.

Johan Petter Norrlin (6 September 1842 – 7 January 1917) was a Finnish botanist and a professor of botany at the University of Helsinki from 1879 to 1903. He was a pioneer of plant geography in Finland, and is also well known for his work on lichens and on the taxonomy of the apomictic taxa of the plant genera Hieracium and Pilosella.

== Life and education ==
Johan Petter Norrlin was born on 6 September 1842 in Hollola, Finland. Norrlin's parents were Nils Nathanael Norrlin and Fredrika Charlotta Lang. He became a student in 1862 at Porvoo high school, and graduated in 1866 as a forester from Evo Forestry College. Norrlin then studied at the University of Helsinki. It was around this time that he met Edvard August Vainio (then named Edvard Lang), the neighbour's son, who was nearly 11 years younger. Young Edvard Lang often accompanied Norrlin on his botanical excursions around Lake Vesijärvi in the summers of 1868 and 1869, helping him collect samples of plants and cryptogams (mosses and lichens). Due to Norrlin's influence, Vainio chose to study botany at university, and his first publications were about plant geography and floristics; Vainio would later become a world-renowned lichenologist. In 1873, Norrlin married Lang's sister.

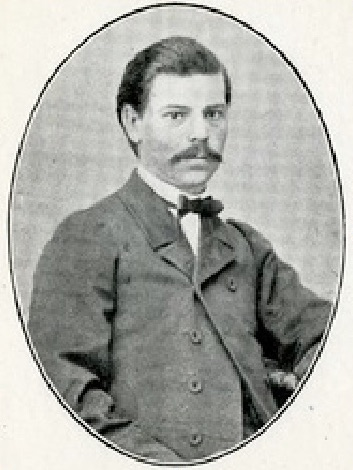
Johan Petter Norrlin, 23 years old

Norrlin graduated with a bachelor's and master's degree in philosophy in 1869 and a licentiate and doctorate in philosophy in 1879. This gave him the qualifications to become a docent. Norrlin was an associate professor at the University of Helsinki from 1879 to 1903.

Norrlin was William Nylander's foremost student, and he became the first expert on Finnish lichens. He was primarily active as a lichen collector, plant geographer and Hieracium researcher. While travelling in different parts of Finland and Lapland, he discovered a large number of interesting or new species that would be formally described by Nylander. Together with Nylander, he published the exsiccata Herbarium lichenum Fenniae (1875–1882). Later on he published two exsiccatae with Hieracium and Pilosella species. The works Bidrag till sydöstra Tavastlands Flora and Flora Kareliae Onegensis I (1871) are examples of Finnish plant geography research in terms of plant topography. Norrlin was instrumental in developing the biogeographic divisions of East Fennoscandia. He showed that Aunus, Karelia and the Kola Peninsula belong to the Finnish natural science area (even though they are geographically in Russia), a conclusion that was later verified with geological surveys. He was named honorary member of the Societas pro Fauna et Flora Fennica in 1912.

Norrlin died at the age of 74 in Helsinki in 1917.

== Legacy ==
Norrlin developed a system called the Norrlin Scale to classify plant prevalence. In this ten-grade scale, the first seven grades (1, 2 = sparse; 3, 4 = scattered; 5, 6, 7 = abundant/plenty) are based on distances (=density) between the individuals of each species, while the upper three grades (8–10) relate to the admixture of other species, overall between 7.5 species (=grade 8) and one species (=grade 10). According to Finnish conservationist and teacher Reino Kalliola, Norrlin's work laid the foundation for future studies of Finnish phytogeography. His ideas were used in the later work of Aimo Kaarlo Cajander, and by phytogeographers of future generations. The International Plant Names Index lists 638 species that were named by Norrlin.

The botanical periodical Norrlinia is named after Norrlin. It is a publication series of the Botanical Museum of the Finnish Museum of Natural History at the University of Helsinki. Norrlin is also honoured in the lichen genus name Norrlinia Theiss. & Syd. (1918), the lichen species Physcia norrlinii Vain. (1921), Porina norrlinii Vain. (1921), Roesleria norrlinii Vain. (1927), Verrucaria norrlinii Pykälä & Myllys (2024), and the plant Hieracium norrlinii Nägeli & Peter.

== Selected publications ==
- 1870. Bidrag till Sydöstra Tavastlands flora (Contribuciones a la flora del sudeste Häme). 123 pp.
- 1875. Flora Kareliae onegensis: Lichenes. 46 pp.
- 1891. Minnesord öfver Sextus Otto Lindberg. Acta Societatis scientiarum Fennicae. Ed. Societas scientiarum Fennicae. 36 pp.
- 1895. Pilosellæ boreales: præcipue floræ fennicæ novæ. Volumen 12 y 14 de Acta Societatis pro fauna et flora Fennica. 83 pp.
- 1906. Suomen keltanot. 154 pp. (Finnish language)
- 1912. Nya nordiska Hieracia beskrifna af J. P. Norrlin
- 1923. Lectio praecursoria. Volumen 23 de Acta forestalia Fennica.
- 1913. Minnesord öfver professor William Nylander, af J. P. Norrlin. Volumen 44 de Acta Societatis Scientiarum Fennicae. Ed. Finska litteratursällskapets tryckeri. 43 pp.
