= Arthur Maillefer =

Swiss botanist and plant geographer (1880–1960)

Arthur Maillefer (25 July 1880 – 21 November 1960) was a Swiss botanist and plant geographer.

He studied numerous classic botanical disciplines, including plant systematics and floristics. He also was very modern in his use of numerical analysis and mathematics. For instance, he made one of the earliest null models in biogeography showing that - in records of plant or animal species over space - genera accumulate much faster than species and thereby refuting Paul Jaccard's interpretation of the species-to-genus ratio in Jaccard's dispute with Alvar Palmgren. Maillefer's statistical solution to the problem was later supported by an analytical solution by the Hungarian mathematician George Pólya.

Maillefer took his PhD at the University of Lausanne. He became extraordinary professor in 1919 and succeeded his former doctoral advisor, Ernst Wilczek, in the chair of botany in 1949. From 1938 to 1950, he was also director of the Botanical Museum of the Canton.
