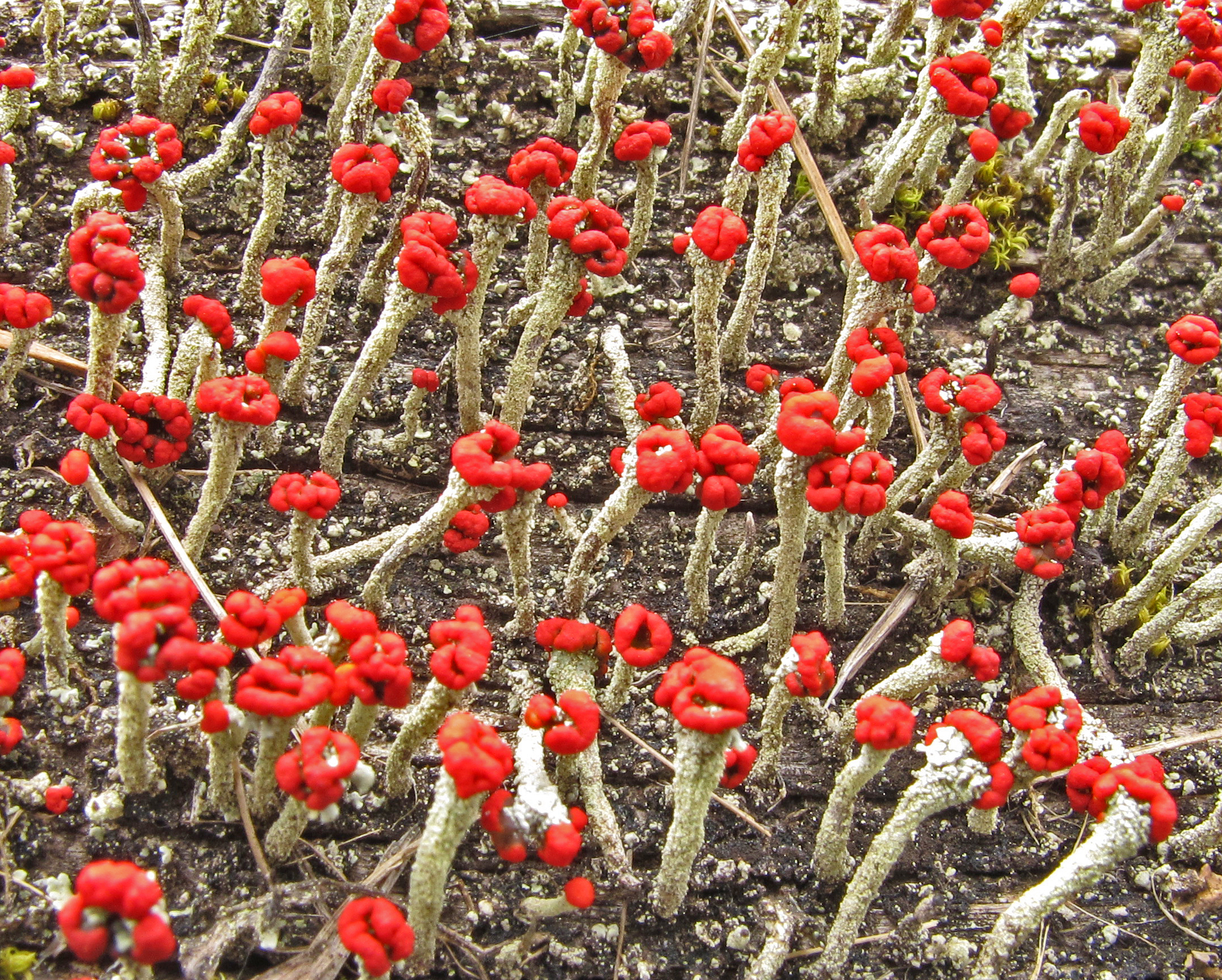

Conservation status
- Secure (NatureServe)

Scientific classification
- Kingdom: Fungi
- Division: Ascomycota
- Class: Lecanoromycetes
- Order: Lecanorales
- Family: Cladoniaceae
- Genus: Cladonia
- Species: C. transcendens

Binomial name
- Cladonia transcendens (Vain.) Vain. (1898)

Synonyms
- Cladonia corallifera var. transcendens Vain. (1887)

= Cladonia transcendens =

Species of lichen

Cladonia transcendens or the graduated cup lichen is a species of fruticose, cup lichen in the family Cladoniaceae.

== Taxonomy ==
The lichen was first formally described by Finnish lichenologist Edvard August Vainio in the first volume of his 1887 work Monographia cladoniarum with the name Cladonia corrallifera γ. transcendens. The type material was collected from Oregon by David Lyall in 1858. In 1898, Vainio raised this taxon to species level.

Teuvo Ahti and Paula DePriest put forth a proposal to conserve the name Cladonia transcendens with a conserved type in 2005. This was later accepted by the Nomenclature Committee for Fungi.

== See also ==
- List of Cladonia species
