= Finnish Natural Heritage Foundation =

Finnish Natural Heritage Foundation sr
- Native name: Luonnonperintösäätiö sr
- Industry: Nature protection
- Founded: 1995
- Founder: Pentti Linkola
- Headquarters: Hämeenlinna, Finland
- Website: luonnonperintosaatio.fi/en/

Finnish Natural Heritage Foundation sr (Finnish: Luonnonperintösäätiö sr) is a foundation founded in 1995 by Finnish ecological activist Pentti Linkola. It was founded to preserve the remaining old-growth forests. The foundation receives donations from private individuals and companies, then purchases forest areas deemed unique enough to deserve protection. The protection of forests is double guaranteed—the forests are protected by Finnish nature protection laws, but also by being legally in ownership of the Finnish Nature Heritage Foundation.
