= Pentti Linkola =

Finnish ecologist (1932–2020)

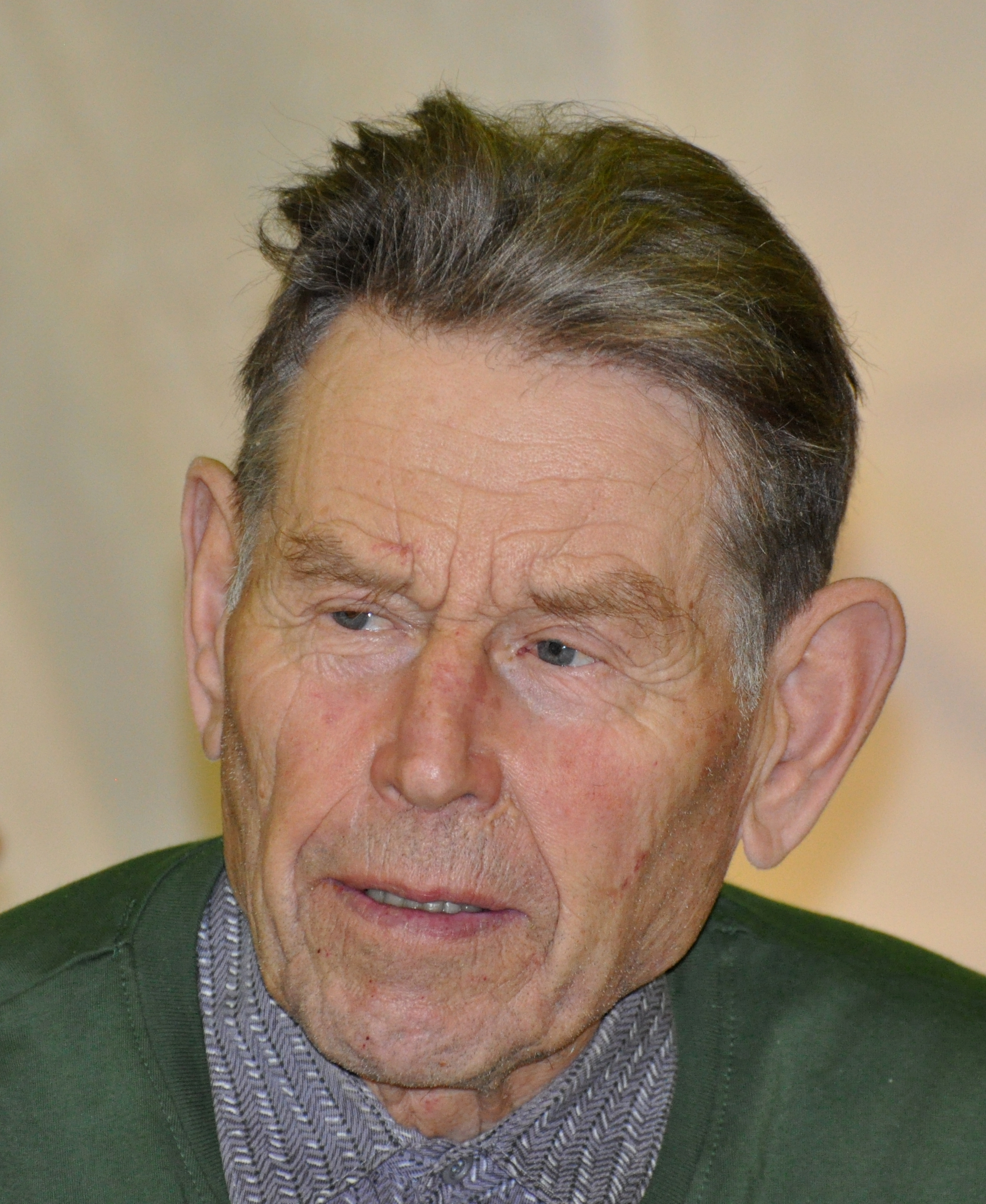
- Linkola in 2011
- Born: Kaarlo Pentti Linkola; 7 December 1932; Helsinki, Finland
- Died: 5 April 2020 (aged 87); Valkeakoski, Finland
- Writing career
- Subjects: Ornithology, environmentalism, nature, deep ecology
- Notable work: Can Life Prevail?: A Revolutionary Approach to the Environmental Crisis (2011)
- Notable awards: Eino Leino Prize; 1983

Kaarlo Pentti Linkola (7 December 1932 – 5 April 2020) was a prominent Finnish deep ecologist, ornithologist, polemicist, naturalist, writer, and fisherman. He wrote widely about his ideas and in Finland was a prominent thinker, and is linked by some authors to ecofascism and to authoritarian deep ecology. Linkola was a year-round fisherman from 1959 to 1995. He fished on Keitele, Päijänne and the Gulf of Finland, and since 1978 he fished on Vanajavesi.

Linkola blamed humans for the continuous degradation of the environment. He promoted rapid population decline to combat the problems commonly attributed to overpopulation. Linkola also defended an end to immigration, the reversion to pre-industrial life ways, and authoritarian measures to keep human life within strict limits.

== Biography ==
Linkola was born on 7 December 1932. He grew up in Helsinki and summered in Kariniemi in Tyrväntö at the farm of his maternal grandfather, Hugo Suolahti. His father, Kaarlo Linkola, was a botanist, phytogeographer, and the Rector of University of Helsinki, and his grandfather Hugo had worked as the chancellor of that same university. Linkola's half-brother, Anssi, was killed during the Continuation War against the Soviet Union in 1941, at the age of 20. One year after Anssi died, Kaarlo died of prostate cancer. Hugo then died in 1944 due to a heart attack. Linkola had an elder sister, Aira, and a younger brother, Martti.

After he graduated from Helsingin Suomalainen Yhteiskoulu in 1950, Linkola studied biology for half a year, then abandoned academic studies to become an independent researcher. He lived in Signilskär in Åland and made ornithological observations. Although he was one of Finland's most famous ornithologists, Linkola started to live an austere life as a fisherman, as this was in line with his teachings. He was involved in the Koijärvi Movement that started in 1979, but his views proved too radical for mainstream Green politics.

In 1995, Linkola founded the Finnish Natural Heritage Foundation (Luonnonperintösäätiö), which concentrates on preserving the few ancient forests still left in southern Finland and other nature conservation. The foundation receives donations from private individuals and companies, then purchases forest areas deemed unique enough to deserve protection. By 2017, the foundation had purchased 62 protected areas, spanning 145 hectares (360 acres) in total. On the 101st anniversary of Finland's independence, Linkola was announced as the winner of a poll conducted by the national broadcaster Yle to determine who had done the most to preserve Finland's natural heritage.

Linkola was married from 1961 to 1975, and had two children. He died in his sleep at his home in Sääksmäki on 5 April 2020.

== Ideas ==
Linkola's views have been sometimes described as "ecofascist". He believed that democracy was a mistake, saying he preferred dictatorships, and only radical change can prevent ecological collapse. He contended that the human populations of the world, regardless if they are developed or underdeveloped, do not deserve to survive at the expense of the biosphere as a whole. In May 1994, Linkola was featured on the front page of The Wall Street Journal Europe. He said he was for a radical reduction in the world population and was quoted as saying about a future world war, "If there were a button I could press, I would sacrifice myself without hesitating, if it meant millions of people would die."

Linkola's writings describe in emotional detail the environmental degradation he witnessed. He dedicated his 1979 Toisinajattelijan päiväkirjasta (From the Diary of a Dissident) to German far-left militants Andreas Baader and Ulrike Meinhof, stating that "they are the signposts, not Jesus of Nazareth or Albert Schweitzer". He supported acts of terrorism such as the 2004 Madrid train bombings as he viewed them as disruptions to a society that is responsible for the degradation of the Earth. When asked in 2007 why he had not himself become a terrorist, Linkola said that he lacked the ability and bravery.

== Reception ==
In the 2009 book Environmental Change and Foreign Policy: Theory and Practice, Mika Merviö, Professor of International Relations at the Kibi International University, contended that while most environmentalists in Finland distanced themselves from Linkola, those concerned about the environment avidly read his writings. Merviö said that Linkola represents "a very Finnish and dark version of 'an inconvenient truth'."

After Linkola's death, the incumbent Minister for Foreign Affairs Pekka Haavisto and Minister of the Environment and Climate Change Krista Mikkonen, both from the Green League, expressed their condolences and praised Linkola's significant efforts for nature conservation. Haavisto said that Linkola had influenced generations of environmentalists, and while Linkola did not defend human rights, there never was disagreement about conservation.

== Works ==
- Linkola, Pentti & Olavi Hilden: Suuri Lintukirja. Otava 1955, renewed edition 1962.
- Linkola, Pentti: Isänmaan ja ihmisen puolesta: Mutta ei ketään vastaan. Fourth edition. Helsinki: Suomen sadankomitealiitto, 1981 (originally published 1960).
- Linkola, Pentti: Pohjolan linnut värikuvin: Elinympäristö. Levinneisyys. Muutto. Otava 1963–67.
- Linkola, Pentti: Unelmat paremmasta maailmasta. Fourth edition. Porvoo: WSOY, 1990.
- Linkola, Pentti: Toisinajattelijan päiväkirjasta. Porvoo: WSOY, 1979. (In 1983 Linkola received the Eino Leino Prize for this book.)
- Linkola, Pentti and Osmo Soininvaara: Kirjeitä Linkolan ohjelmasta. Porvoo: WSOY, 1986.
- Linkola, Pentti: Johdatus 1990-luvun ajatteluun. Porvoo: WSOY, 1989.
- Vilkka, Leena (ed.): Ekologiseen elämäntapaan: lead article. Helsinki: Yliopistopaino, 1996.
- Linkola, Pentti: Voisiko elämä voittaa. Helsinki: Tammi, 2004.
- Linkola, Pentti: Can Life Prevail?: A Revolutionary Approach to the Environmental Crisis. UK: Arktos Media, 2nd Revised ed. 2011. ISBN 9781907166631 (English translation of Voisiko elämä voittaa, 2004).
