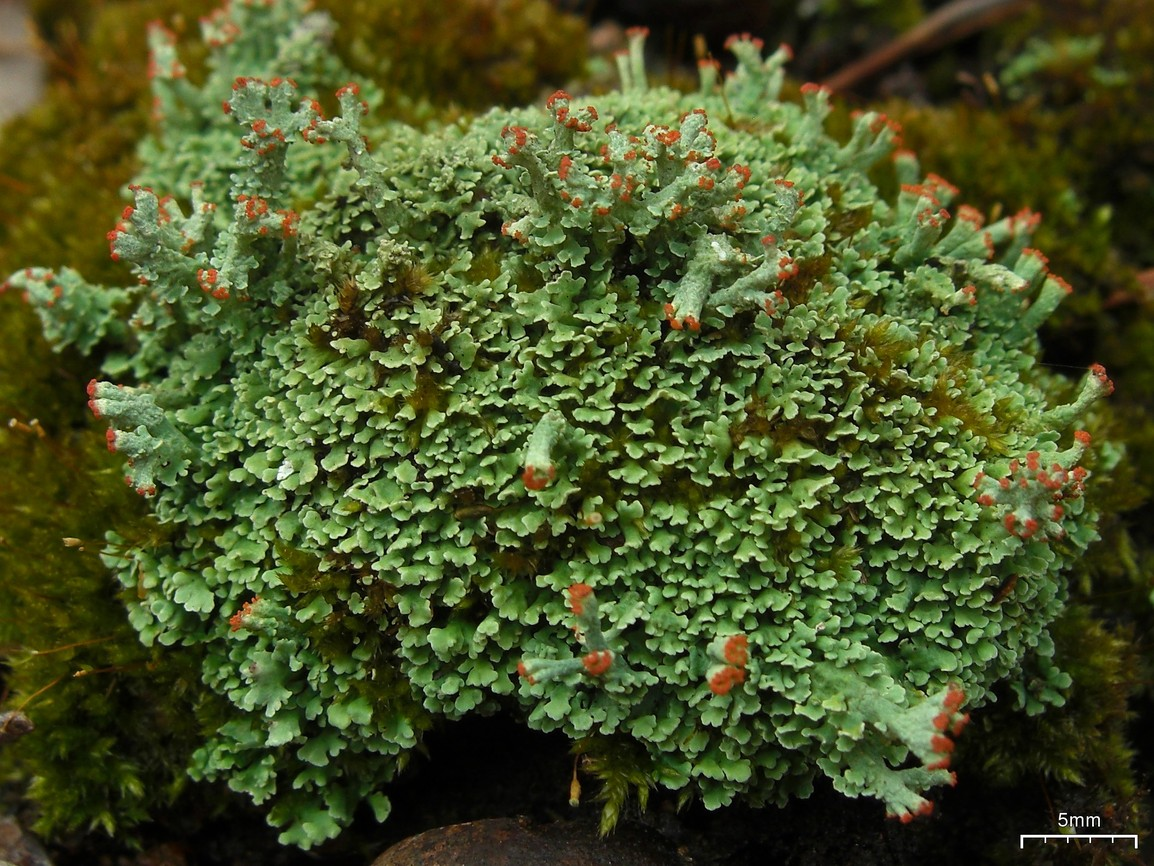

Scientific classification
- Domain: Eukaryota
- Kingdom: Fungi
- Division: Ascomycota
- Class: Lecanoromycetes
- Order: Lecanorales
- Family: Cladoniaceae
- Genus: Cladonia
- Species: C. sobolescens

Binomial name
- Cladonia sobolescens Nyl. ex Vain. (1887)

Synonyms
- Cladonia clavulifera Vain. (1924)

= Cladonia sobolescens =

Species of lichen

Cladonia sobolescens, commonly known as the peg lichen, is a species of fruticose lichen. It is found in temperate eastern North America and East Asia.

== Taxonomy ==
Cladonia sobolescens is classified in the section Helopodium of genus Cladonia. According to Finnish lichenologist Teuvo Ahti, Vainio's Cladonia clavulifera is a synonym. Cladonia sobolescens is commonly known as the "peg lichen".

== Description ==
The primary squamules of Cladonia sobolescens are rounded to strap-shaped, and range in color from greyish to green to brown, depending on the degree of sun exposure it has had. When growing vertically, a white lower surface may become exposed. The podetia, which lack cups or soredia, are short and peg-like, rarely branching once or twice near the tips. They are 5–20 mm (0.2–0.8 in) tall, topped with brown apothecia that only slightly or not at all broader than the tips of the podetia.

The lichen contains fumarprotocetraric acid as its main secondary metabolite, and a smaller amount of protocetraric acid. It is a fumarprotocetraric acid chemotype of Cladonia subcariosa.

== Habitat and distribution ==
Cladonia sobolescens is found in temperate eastern North America and East Asia. The northern limit of its North American range extends to Prince Edward Island in Canada.

== See also ==
- List of Cladonia species
