= Rolf Palmgren =

Rolf Odo Armand Palmgren (22 May 1880 – 6 October 1944) was a Finnish ornithologist, naturalist, and conservationist. He served as the curator of Högholmen zoological garden briefly before he was suspended for embezzlement. He worked towards the establishment of several conservation reserves in Finland and wrote several books.

Palmgren was born to judicial officer Oskar Ludvig Palmgren and Agnes Maria Elisabet Renvall in Helsinki. He joined the Vanamo society in 1896 and became keenly interested in natural history, visiting Drumsö and Gammelstadsviken for studying birds. He became more systematic in his observations after reading the works of Johan Axel Palmén and published notes in the Acta Societa's pro Fauna et Flora Fennica. Professor Palmen saw his works and recommended him for a scholarship. Palmgren made a research trip to Ladogakarelen. He studied philosophy and graduated in 1909 and became a superintendent in Korkeasaari zoo in 1910 and was sent to study zoos around Europe. He then began to set about improving the zoo. He however handled the zoo employees badly and there were numerous acts of damage done by the zookeepers. There were also severe food shortages and the zoo animals were transferred to Högholmen near Helsinki and Palmgren was made curator of all the parks and zoos of Helsinki. He was involved in establishing conservation areas in Ekenäs archipelago and in 1924 he was made state conservation inspector. He also taught in school from 1914 to 1924. He was accused of embezzlement and dismissed in 1929. He then lived a life of poverty and only made some income from lectures and writing. He died in Kottby and only a few Swedish newspapers reported his death.
