= Pontus Palmgren =

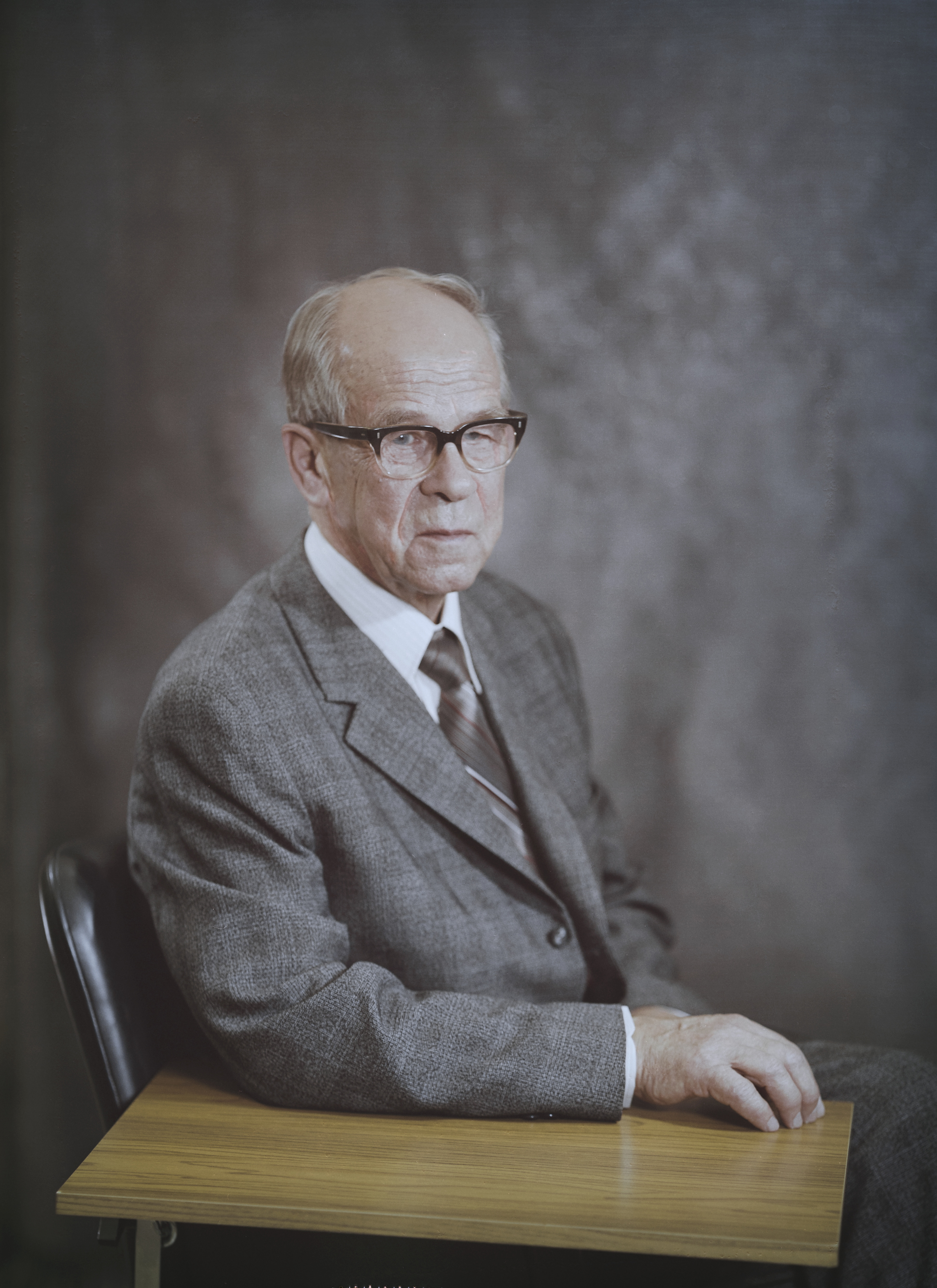
Professor Palmgren in 1980

Pontus Palmgren (27 April 1907 – 26 November 1993) was a Finnish ornithologist, arachnologist, and a professor of zoology at the University of Helsinki. He pioneered ethology and quantitative ecology in Finland.

== Life and work ==
Palmgren was born in Helsinki where his father Alvar Palmgren was a professor of botany. He became interested at an early age in natural history and was influenced by his father's approach to statistical examination of phytogeography. He learned illustration and studied biology at the University of Helsinki. He studied drawing under Eero Järnefelt. His dissertation in 1930 was on bird distributions and habitats. He then worked as an amanuensis at the zoological museum from 1930 and became a professor of zoology in 1940. Among his bird studies were examinations of zugunruhe and diurnal rhythms. He headed the Tvärminne zoological station from 1952. He served as an editor of the journal Ornis Fennica from 1931 to 1948. His textbook Eläinpsychologia (Animal Psychology) published in 1954, introduced the study of animal behaviour. He also published a faunistic work on spiders in eight parts from 1939 to 1977.
