= Core-satellite species hypothesis =

A hypothetical bimodal frequency distribution of species across sites illustrating the core-satellite hypothesis

The core-satellite hypothesis is a theory in ecology that attempts to explain the pattern of species distributions seen in nature. According to the theory, first proposed by Ilkka Hanski in 1982 and developed further subsequently, suggests that species within a particular ecosystem can be classed as "core" species which are locally abundant and widely distributed; and "satellite" species which are sparsely distributed. Hanski noted that regional species distributions are bimodal, an observation made earlier by Christen C. Raunkiær (occupancy frequency distribution) - with most species being uncommon (occurring only in some patches) and some species being ubiquitous. Hanski proposed a null metapopulation model that produces such a bimodal distribution. It assumes that all species are capable of utilizing all sites and makes use of local colonization and extinction dynamics. He also proposed a connection between the core-satellite hypothesis and the r/K selection theory. An examination of host-parasite data was interpreted by some researchers including Robert May as suggesting that bimodality could be produced by certain distributional features and result without the need for the metapopulation dynamics described by Hanski.
