= Alvar Palmgren =

Finnish botanist and plant ecologist

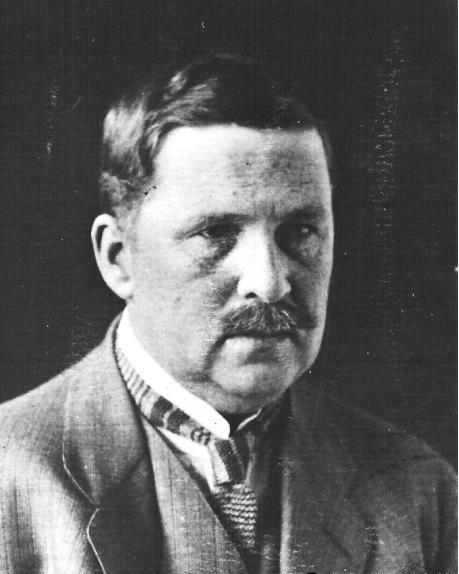
- Born: 28 April 1880; Helsinki, Finland
- Died: 30 November 1960 (aged 80); Helsinki, Finland
- Education: University of Helsinki
- Scientific career
- Fields: botany, plant ecology
- Workplaces: University of Helsinki
- Doctoral advisor: J.P. Norrlin
- Author abbrev. (botany): Palmgr.

Alvar Palmgren (28 April 1880 – 30 November 1960) was a Finnish botanist and plant ecologist. Palmgren studied botany at the University of Helsinki under professor J.P. Norrlin. He graduated (Fil.kand.) in 1906 and obtained his Ph.D. in 1914. He became docent of botany at the University of Helsinki 1916 and professor of botany at the same university in 1928 (from 1938, the first in the special Swedish-language chair of botany). He retired in 1950.

== Research ==
Palmgren worked as a systematic botanist with microspecies of Taraxacum, Hieracium and other genera. As an ecologist, he worked of the nature of plant communities. He supported the ideas of Henry Gleason on the individualistic behaviour of species in community assembly already from the 1920s. Palmgren wrote early accounts on the role of isolation and stochastic events in the distribution of species, while his contemporary biology was largely deterministic.

== Jaccard dispute ==
In the 1920s, Palmgren entered in a heated dispute with the Swiss botanist and phytogeographer Paul Jaccard over the interpretation of Jaccard's species-to-genus ratio. Palmgren had observed a decrease in species richness from west to east in Åland, his main geographical scene of scientific inquiry. He interpreted this as an effect of isolation from the Swedish mainland to the west, and the associated lower species-to-genus ratio as a random sampling effect. In contrast, Jaccard held that the lower species-to-genus ratio towards the east was an effect of decreased diversity in habitat conditions and increased competitive exclusion. The Swiss botanist Arthur Maillefer showed statistically that genera accumulate much faster than species and that therefore Jaccard's biological explanation of the pattern was unnecessary since it could be fully explained as a statistical sampling effect. An analytical solution with the same result was provided by the Hungarian mathematician George Pólya. In essence, this disagreement were repeated by Charles Elton vs. C. B. Williams and again reiterated by Peter Grant and Daniel Simberloff in the 1970s.

== Miscellaneous ==
Palmgren was on the board of Societas pro Fauna et Flora Fennica from 1916. He was chairman 1920–1957.

Palmgren (co-) edited two exsiccata works, namely Carices fulvellae Fries and together with L. Fagerström Carices extensae exsiccatae a Museo Botanico Universitatis Helsingiensis distributae.

In addition to his botanical work, Palmgren made an impressive political act as a 22-year-old student. He initiated and led a movement among young Finnish men to refuse conscription service in the Russian Imperial Army. A rescript of 1900 by Nicholas II of Russia, sovereign of the Grand Duchy of Finland, put Finnish conscripts under the Russian military top. The 'strike' movement forced a withdrawal by 1905.

Alvar Palmgren was the father of the zoologist Pontus Palmgren (1907–1993) and the cousin of the ornithologist Rolf Palmgren (1880–1944).
