= Ilkka Hanski =

Finnish ecologist (1953–2016)

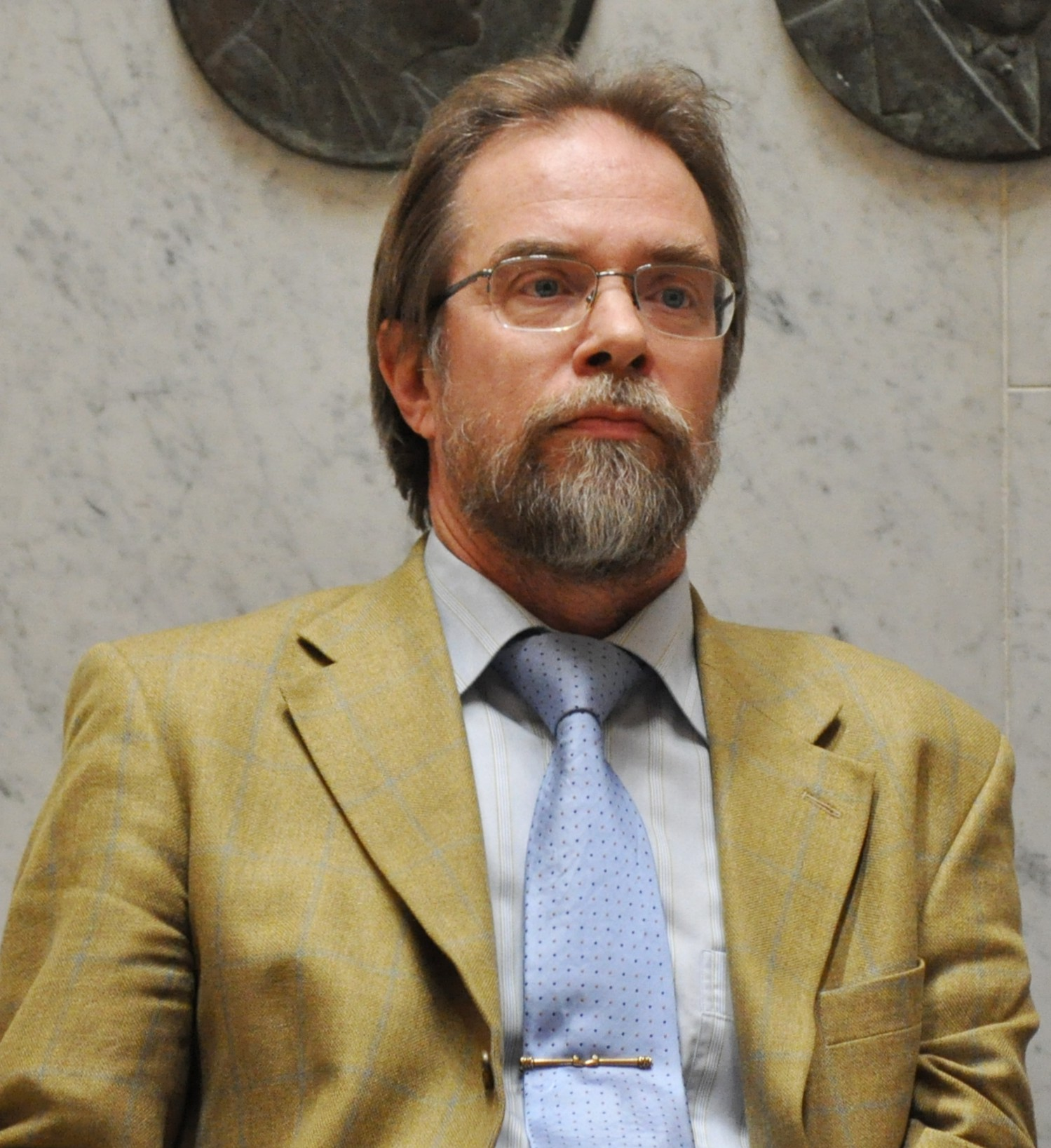
- Ilkka Hanski in 2009.
- Born: Ilkka Aulis Hanski; 14 February 1953; Lempäälä, Finland
- Died: 10 May 2016 (aged 63); Helsinki, Finland
- Education: Helsinki University; Oxford University
- Known for: Metapopulation Theory
- Awards: Balzan Prize (2000); Sewall Wright Award (2001); ForMemRS (2005); Crafoord Prize (2011); Kempe Award for Distinguished Ecologists (2011); BBVA Foundation Frontiers of Knowledge Award (2015)
- Scientific career
- Fields: Ecology; Biology
- Workplaces: Helsinki University
- Website: www.helsinki.fi/~ihanski/

Ilkka Aulis Hanski ForMemRS (14 February 1953 – 10 May 2016) was a Finnish ecologist at the University of Helsinki, Finland. The Metapopulation Research Center led by Hanski, until his death, has been nominated as a Center of Excellence by the Academy of Finland. The group studies species living in fragmented landscapes and attempts to advance metapopulation ecology research. Hanski proposed the core-satellite hypothesis of species distributions. Metapopulation ecology itself studies populations of plants and animals which are separated in space by occupying patches.

== Career ==
Ilkka Hanski took his bachelor's degree and Licentiate's degree in the University of Helsinki in 1976 and Doctoral degree from the University of Oxford in 1979. Hanski was a graduate student in Oxford from 1976 to 1979. He was appointed as a docent in the University of Helsinki in 1981 and in the University of Joensuu in 1983. He worked in the Academy of Finland from 1978 to 1988 as well as from 1991 to 1992. He worked as an acting professor of zoology in the University of Helsinki from 1988 to 1991, and was appointed (full) professorship of zoology in 1993. Hanski served as an Academy Professor for the Academy of Finland from 1996 until his death. In 2000, he was elected a foreign member of the Royal Swedish Academy of Sciences.

The central questions of metapopulation biology studies by Hanski have several practical applications. For example, understanding biodiversity and population variability is essential for practical work in conservation biology and in regional planning. Mathematical models developed by the Hanski group can be used to build and promote coexistence of Man and Nature, for instance in urban environments where planning of green areas bears importance.

The field research of the Glanville fritillary butterfly in Åland is a well-known classical model system. The scientific literature produced by Hanski is rather enormous; the ISI Web of Knowledge database suggests that he is the author or co-author of more than 200 scientific articles and has edited several books. As of May 2010 he is the seventh most cited ecologist in the world.

Hanski died of a long-illness on 10 May 2016 in Helsinki, aged 63.

== Advocacy ==
Hanski was also an active advocate of nature and biodiversity conservation, participating in public debates. His central view was that the responsibility of ecologists is not restricted to producing scientific information but includes avid participation in the processes using the information produced.

== Awards and recognition ==
In 2000, he was awarded the Balzan Prize for Ecological Sciences. He was elected a Foreign Member of the Royal Society (ForMemRS) in 2005, the second Finnish scientist ever to receive this award. In April 2006, he was made an Honorary Fellow of the National Academy of Sciences. He was awarded the Crafoord Prize in biosciences 2011 "for his pioneering studies on how spatial variation affects the dynamics of animal and plant populations".

In 2010 he was awarded an honorary doctorate by The Norwegian University of Science and Technology (NTNU).

In 2016, Hanski was awarded the BBVA Foundation Frontiers of Knowledge Award in Ecology and Conservation Biology for opening up an area of ecology that explains how species survive in fragmented habitats and allows to quantify extinction thresholds. In September 2015, he received the honorary title of Academician of Science from the Academy of Finland.
