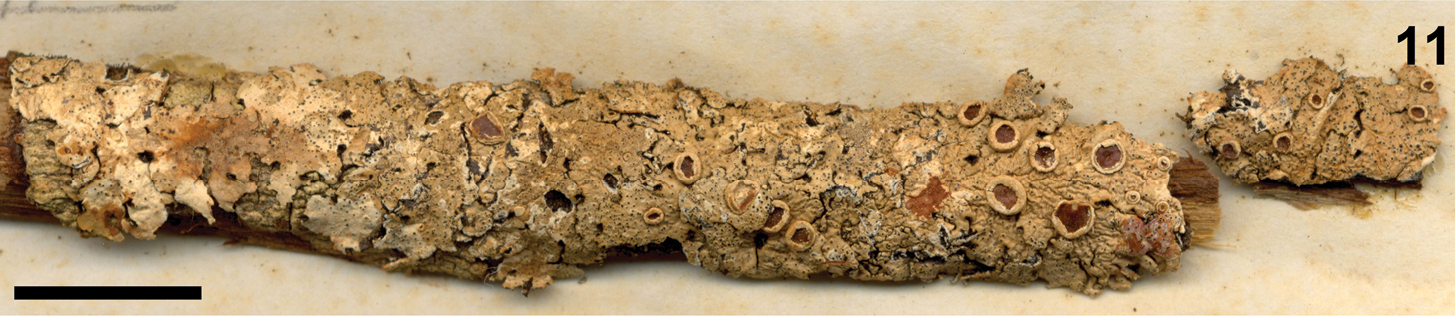
- Holotype of B. meizospora

Scientific classification
- Domain: Eukaryota
- Kingdom: Fungi
- Division: Ascomycota
- Class: Lecanoromycetes
- Order: Lecanorales
- Family: Parmeliaceae
- Genus: Bulbothrix
- Species: B. meizospora

Binomial name
- Bulbothrix meizospora (Nyl.) Hale (1974)

Synonyms
- Parmelia tiliacea var. meizospora Nyl. (1860); Parmelia meizospora (Nyl.) Nyl. (1869); Bulbothrix vainioi Jungbluth, Marcelli & Elix (2008)

= Bulbothrix meizospora =

Species of lichen

Bulbothrix meizospora is a species of foliose lichen in the family Parmeliaceae. It is found in Africa, Asia, and South America, where it grows on tree bark.

== Taxonomy ==
The lichen was first formally described by Finnish lichenologist William Nylander in 1860 as Parmelia tiliacea var. meizospora Nyl.; he later transferred it to the genus Parmelia and promoted it to full species status in 1869. In 1974 Mason Hale transferred the group of species called Parmelia series Bicornutae (Lynge) Hale & Kurokawa to the genus Bulbothrix, including Bulbothrix meizospora. The type was collected in the Nilgiri Mountains in India.

According to Michel Navarro Benatti, who wrote a 2012 review on the Bulbothrix species with medullary salazinic acid, Bulbothrix vainioi Jungbluth, Marcelli & Elix is a synonym of Bulbothrix meizospora. Found in Brazil, B. vainioi was created to hold specimens with ascospores over 12 μm long that were included by Hale provisionally in Bulbothrix sensibilis. However, as Benatti explained, this spore size is well within the range reported for B. meizospora, and both of the taxa are morphologically and chemically identical (as determined with lichen spot tests).

== Description ==
Bulbothrix meizospora has a greenish-grey thallus measuring 2.5–9 cm (1.0–3.5 in) wide. The thallus comprises small, tightly attached (adnate) and irregularly branched lobes that are 2–4 mm wide. Reproductive structures such as pustules, soredia, and isidia are absent from the thallus. The medulla is white, while the lower thallus surface is dull, black, wrinkled, and papillate (covered with small protuberances), with a dark brown margin that measures 0.1–3 mm wide. Some of the lobes have simple (unbranched) black rhizines on the margins, while others have a rhizine-free border.

The apothecia are cup-shaped, measuring 1–6 mm in diameter with a smooth margin and a brown disc. Ascospores are ellipsoid to ovoid in shape, and typically measure 12–14 by 8–10 μm. Secondary compounds produced by Bulbothrix meizospora include atranorin and chloratranorin in the cortex, and consalazinic acid and salazinic acid in the medulla.

== Habitat and distribution ==
In Asia, Bulbothrix meizospora is found in India, Thailand, Pakistan, and Nepal. In Africa, it has been recorded from Cameroon, Kenya, Malawi, and Tanzania. In South America, it is known from Brazil (originally reported as Bulbothrix vainioi).
