= Paul Jaccard =

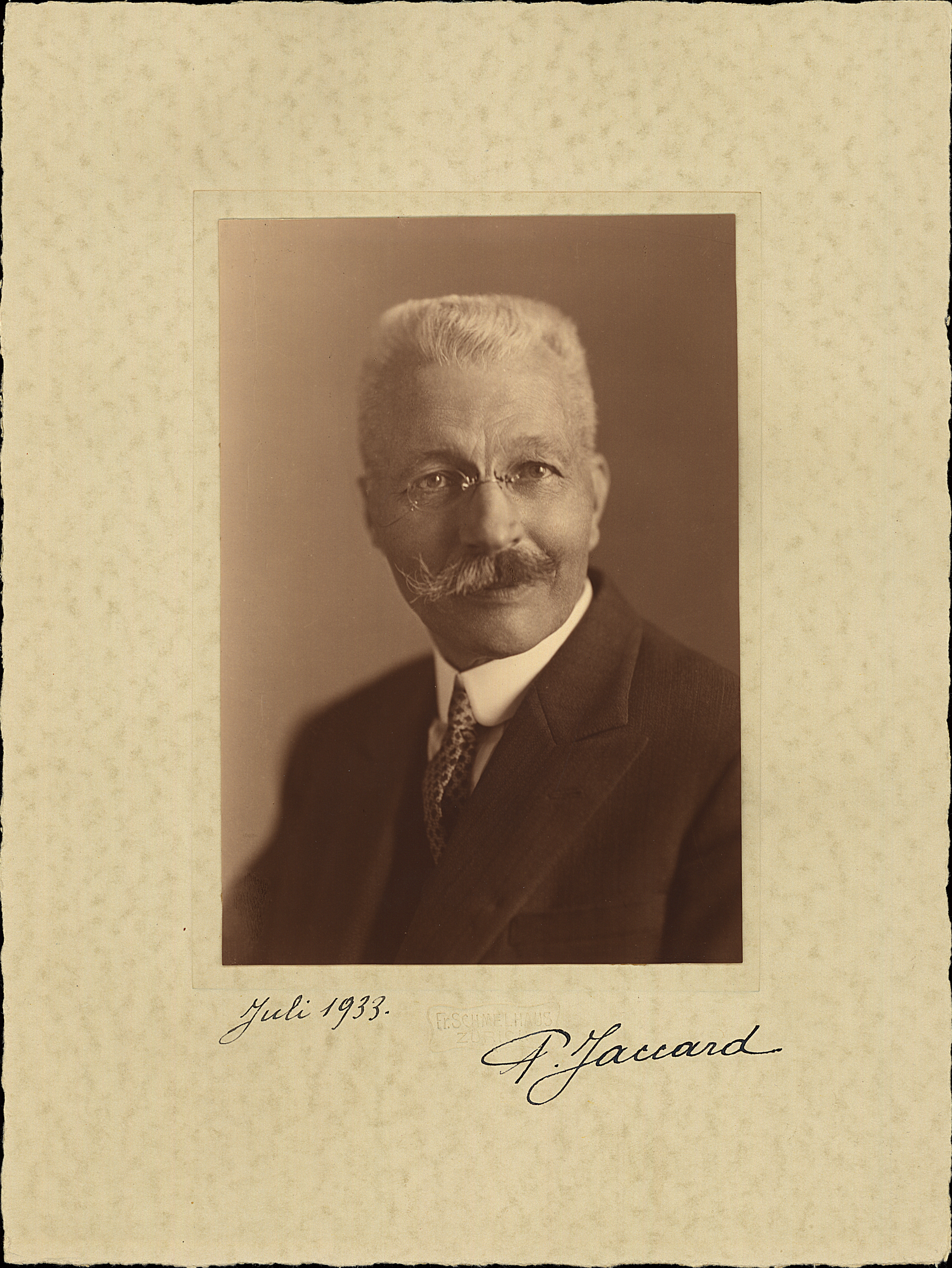
Paul Jaccard

Paul Jaccard (18 November 1868 in Sainte-Croix – 9 May 1944 in Zurich) was a professor of botany and plant physiology at the ETH Zurich. He studied at the University of Lausanne and ETH Zurich (PhD 1894). He continued studies in Paris with Gaston Bonnier. He developed the Jaccard index of similarity (he called it coefficient de communauté) and published it in 1901. He also introduced the use of the species-to-genus ratio (he called it generic coefficient) in biogeography. In the 1920s, Paul Jaccard engaged in a dispute with the Finnish botanist and phytogeographer Alvar Palmgren over the interpretation of species-to-genus ratio, as evidence of competitive exclusion (as held by Jaccard) or attributable to random sampling (as held by Palmgren).
