= Graphis flavopalmicola =

Scientific classification
- Kingdom: Fungi
- Division: Ascomycota
- Class: Lecanoromycetes
- Order: Graphidales
- Family: Graphidaceae
- Genus: Graphis
- Species: G. flavopalmicola

Binomial name
- Graphis flavopalmicola Y.Joshi, Lücking & Hur (2010)
- Holotype: Hallasan, South Korea

Species of lichen-forming fungus

Graphis flavopalmicola is a rare species of script lichen in the family Graphidaceae. It is found in South Korea. Graphis flavopalmicola is a lichen species known for its smooth to slightly wrinkled, pale greyish-white surface that glows pale yellow under ultraviolet light. Its fruiting bodies have black, exposed disc with edges that are entirely carbonised (blackened). The lichen produces small spores that are divided by several cross-walls.

== Taxonomy ==
The lichen was formally described as a new species in 2010 by the lichenologists Yogesh Joshi, Robert Lücking, and Jae-Seoun Hur. The type specimen was collected by Hur from the shield volcano Hallasan (Mt. Halla) at an elevation of 1,714 m (5,623 ft), where he found it growing on fir bark. The species epithet alludes to both the lichen's yellow thallus colouration under UV light and its similarity to Graphis palmicola.

== Description ==
Graphis flavopalmicola is crustose lichen with a thallus that is continuous and smooth to slightly wrinkled (rugulose), and it measures between 75 and 100 μm in thickness. The surface of the thallus is white or ash-grey and opaque, with scattered hyaline crystals, particularly clustered near the exciple. This species lacks soredia and a prothallus.

The apothecia of Graphis flavopalmicola are densely packed and lirelliform, which means they are elongated and slit-like. These structures are erumpent, breaking through the surface, and are typically unbranched, although occasional dichotomous (forked) or trichotomous (three-way) branching can occur. The apothecia are straight to slightly curved (flexuose), ranging from 1 to 6 mm in length and 0.1 to 0.2 mm in width, with terminal ends that are acute to obtuse. The disc of the apothecia is exposed, black, and lacks a pruinose (powdery) coating.

The thalline margin, which is the part of the lichen thallus that borders the apothecia, is basal to lateral but can extend to the tips of some lirellae. The labia, or lips of the apothecia, are entire and convergent. The exciple, which is the rim or wall surrounding the apothecia, is basally closed and fully carbonised, appearing dirty brown in thin sections and containing hyaline crystals.

The epithecium (the uppermost layer of the apothecium) is indistinct and brownish, measuring 5 to 7.5 μm. The hymenium, which is the fertile spore-bearing layer, is hyaline (transparent and colourless), not inspersed (not containing oil droplets), and measures 75 to 140 μm in height. The paraphyses, or sterile filaments among the spores, are hyaline, thread-like (filiform), unbranched, dense, and moderately club-shaped (clavate) at the tips, which are yellowish-brown and 1 to 1.5 μm thick. The ascospores of Graphis flavopalmicola typically number eight per ascus, are hyaline, and have 5 to 9 transversely positioned cross-walls, or septa. They are oblong-fusiform (spindle-shaped), straight, and have rounded to narrowly rounded tips, measuring 19 to 27 μm in length and 4 to 7 μm in width.

Chemical tests for Graphis flavopalmicola show the following spot test reactions: the thallus is K− or turns yellowish-brown, C−, KC−, P−, and UV+ (pale yellow). Thin-layer chromatography reveals the presence of the xanthone substance lichexanthone, which is responsible for the positive ultraviolet test.

== Similar species ==
Graphis flavopalmicola is identified by its smooth to slightly wrinkled whitish-grey thallus, which glows pale yellow under UV light, an exposed blackish disc, entire labia, a fully carbonised exciple, and small transversely septate ascospores. Morphologically, it can be mistaken for Graphis palmicola, Graphis assimilis, and Graphis stipitata. However, Graphis palmicola has a thallus that does not fluoresce under UV light. Graphis assimilis features larger ascospores (23–54 μm) and produces norstictic acid without lichexanthone. Graphis stipitata is distinguished by a laterally carbonised exciple, slightly smaller ascospores (15–20 μm long), and the presence of both norstictic acid and lichexanthone.

Graphis flavopalmicola is one of only six Graphis species known to contain lichexanthone; the others are G. stipitata, G. sauroidea, G. haleana, G. lucifica, and G. neeladriensis. As of 2013, there were 13 species of Graphis known to occur in South Korea.

== Habitat and distribution ==
Graphis flavopalmicola has been documented exclusively from its type locality. It was discovered growing on the bark of Abies koreana at an elevation of 1714 metres. The lichen grows in subalpine forests, predominantly composed of the Abies koreana community.

== See also ==
- List of Graphis (lichen) species
