= Graphis rosae-emiliae =

Scientific classification
- Kingdom: Fungi
- Division: Ascomycota
- Class: Lecanoromycetes
- Order: Graphidales
- Family: Graphidaceae
- Genus: Graphis
- Species: G. rosae-emiliae

Binomial name
- Graphis rosae-emiliae A.B.Peña & Lücking (2014)
- Type locality: Los Tuxtlas Biosphere Reserve, Mexico

Species of lichen-forming fungus

Graphis rosae-emiliae is a species of script lichen in the family Graphidaceae. Described in 2014 from the Los Tuxtlas Biosphere Reserve in Veracruz, Mexico, this bark-dwelling lichen forms a smooth, greenish-grey crust in humid lowland rainforests, where it grows on canopy branches. The species is characterised by its unbranched, slit-like fruiting bodies (lirellae) with black, grooved lips, relatively large ascospores divided by 9–13 cross-walls, and the absence of detectable secondary metabolites.

== Taxonomy ==
Graphis rosae-emiliae was described as new in 2014 from Veracruz, Mexico, based on collections made in the Los Tuxtlas Biosphere Reserve (including the Los Tuxtlas Tropical Biology Station, near Laguna Zacatal) in lowland rainforest.

The species was distinguished from similar Graphis lichens by several features: unbranched, slit-like fruiting bodies (lirellae) that break through the surface (erumpent) and have a rim of thallus tissue along the sides (lateral thalline margin) and black, grooved lips (labia); a completely blackened (carbonized) fruiting body wall (exciple); a spore-bearing layer (hymenium) that is inspersed (contains granular deposits); colorless ascospores divided by cross-walls (transversely septate) measuring 45–55 × 5–10 μm; and the absence of detectable secondary metabolites (chemical compounds). In the original discussion it is compared particularly with G. syzygii (which has smaller spores and stictic acid), and with several other morphologically similar species that either have much larger spores and norstictic acid or differ in the presence/absence and type of hymenial inspersion.

== Description ==
The thallus is a smooth, greenish-gray crust on bark, continuous and corticate, typically 1–3 cm across and about 120–180 μm thick. In section it has a cartilaginous upper cortex, an irregular algal layer, and conspicuous clusters of calcium oxalate crystals; a prothallus is not evident.

The apothecia are lirelliform and flexuose, unbranched, and erumpent, with a lateral thalline margin. Individual lirellae are about 1–3 mm long, about 0.25 mm wide, and 0.1 mm high, with the disc concealed. The labia are black and striate, and the exciple is completely carbonized. The hymenium is inspersed and the ascospores are colorless, eight per ascus, oblong, and transversely 9–13-septate, measuring about 45–55 × 5–10 μm. Thin-layer chromatography reported no lichen substances, with spot tests negative.

== Habitat and distribution ==
Graphis rosae-emiliae is known from low elevations in Veracruz, Mexico, within the Los Tuxtlas Biosphere Reserve, where it was collected in humid lowland rainforest. The type locality is a high-humidity tropical rainforest site at about 242 m (794 ft) elevation on the east side of the San Martin Tuxtla volcano.

The type material was collected from canopy branches (including on Orthion oblanceolatum), and an additional specimen was also reported from the canopy, about 21 km (13 mi) from the type locality, at about 345 m (1,132 ft) elevation on the northern slope of the Santa Marta Volcano.

== See also ==
- List of Graphis (lichen) species
