= Graphis norstictica =

Scientific classification
- Kingdom: Fungi
- Division: Ascomycota
- Class: Lecanoromycetes
- Order: Graphidales
- Family: Graphidaceae
- Genus: Graphis
- Species: G. norstictica

Binomial name
- Graphis norstictica Archer & Lücking (2009)

Species of lichen-forming fungus

Graphis norstictica is a species of script lichen in the family Graphidaceae. It was described as new to science in 2009. This lichen forms pale greyish patches on tree bark with elongated, branched fruiting structures that contain a chemical compound called norstictic acid. It has been found in tropical regions including the Philippines, Kenya, and Papua New Guinea, where it grows on the bark of trees.

== Taxonomy ==
Graphis norstictica was described in 2009 by Alan W. Archer and Robert Lücking from a specimen collected in the Philippines and originally associated with the name Graphis nanodes. The original material of G. nanodes comprised two syntypes, one containing norstictic acid and another lacking lichen substances. Since Edvard Vainio's 1921 description of G. nanodes reported the thallus as K− (indicating no reaction in the potassium hydroxide spot test), the chemically negative syntype was designated as the lectotype for that species. The well-developed norstictic acid–containing collection lacked a valid name and was therefore described as G. norstictica; its specific epithet refers to the presence of this lichen product.

The species belongs to a small group of three closely related taxa (G. renschiana, G. borealis, and G. norstictica) that share similar lirella morphology and anatomy (lineola-morph) and similar chemistry but differ in ascospore size.

== Description ==
The thallus of G. norstictica is corticate (having a defined cortex), smooth to uneven in texture, and white to pale yellowish grey in colour. The lirellae—elongated, often branched fruiting bodies typical of Graphis—are erumpent (breaking through the surface), possess a lateral thalline margin (rim of thallus tissue on the sides), and are elongate with irregular branching. They measure 1–5 mm long by 0.2–0.3 mm wide, and their edges (labia) are entire (smooth, without striations). The excipulum (rim around the spore-bearing tissue) is laterally carbonised (blackened), and the hymenium (spore-bearing layer) is clear, lacking oil droplets or granules. Each ascus contains eight ascospores, which are muriform (divided into many chambers by both transverse and longitudinal septa), colourless (hyaline), and measure 35–50 × 17–25 micrometres.

== Habitat and distribution ==
Graphis norstictica has been recorded from the Philippines, Kenya, and Papua New Guinea. It occurs in habitats suitable for other lineola-morph Graphis species, typically on the bark of trees in tropical or subtropical regions.

== See also ==
- List of Graphis (lichen) species
