= Graphis subintermedians =

Scientific classification
- Kingdom: Fungi
- Division: Ascomycota
- Class: Lecanoromycetes
- Order: Graphidales
- Family: Graphidaceae
- Genus: Graphis
- Species: G. subintermedians

Binomial name
- Graphis subintermedians Hale ex Lücking (2009)

Species of lichen-forming fungus

Graphis subintermedians is a species of script lichen in the family Graphidaceae. This bark-dwelling lichen forms white to pale grey crusts with short, sparsely branched fruiting structures that have finely lined edges and produce large, multi-chambered spores. It is known only from the rainforests of Sabah in Malaysian Borneo, where it was originally collected by the American lichenologist Mason Hale.

== Taxonomy ==
The species was formally described in 2009 by Robert Lücking, following Mason Hale's earlier unpublished manuscript name. The type locality is Sabah, Malaysian Borneo, where the holotype specimen was collected by Hale and is housed at the United States National Herbarium (US). Graphis subintermedians is placed in a small group of taxa characterised by a laterally carbonised (blackened) excipulum, striate (finely lined) lirellae, a clear hymenium, and muriform (multi-chambered) ascospores. It differs from the otherwise similar Graphis pseudoserpens in having larger ascospores, and within this group it is the only species that both lacks detectable secondary metabolites and has ascospores exceeding 60 × 16 μm.

== Description ==
The thallus is corticate (possessing a distinct outer cortex), smooth to uneven in texture, and white to pale grey in colour. The lirellae are erumpent to prominent, have a basal thalline margin (rim of thallus tissue at the base), and are short and sparsely branched, measuring 1–3 mm long by 0.3–0.4 mm wide. Their edges (labia) are striate. The excipulum is laterally carbonised, and the hymenium is clear (lacking oil droplets or granules). Each ascus contains two large ascospores, which are hyaline, muriform, and measure 40–75 × 20–30 μm.

== Habitat and distribution ==
No lichen secondary metabolites have been detected in this species. Graphis subintermedians is known from Sabah in Malaysian Borneo, where it grows on bark in forested habitats.

== See also ==
- List of Graphis (lichen) species
