= Graphis suzanae =

Scientific classification
- Kingdom: Fungi
- Division: Ascomycota
- Class: Lecanoromycetes
- Order: Graphidales
- Family: Graphidaceae
- Genus: Graphis
- Species: G. suzanae

Binomial name
- Graphis suzanae Koch & S.C.Feuerst. (2016)

Species of lichen-forming fungus

Graphis suzanae is a species of corticolous (bark-dwelling) script lichen in the family Graphidaceae. Described as new to science in 2016, it is found in southern Brazil.

== Taxonomy ==
Graphis suzanae was first formally described by Natália Koch and Shirley Feuerstein in 2016. The species was named in honour of Dr. Suzana de Azevedo Martins, a professor known for her contributions to the understanding of Brazilian lichens and her promotion of numerous lichen studies in the southern part of the country. The type specimen of this lichen species was found in the Forqueta locality in Maquiné (Rio Grande do Sul, Brazil), at an elevation of 308 m (1,010 ft).

== Description ==
A crustose lichen, Graphis suzanae is characterised by its smooth to irregular surface, appearing in a greyish-white hue, often devoid of soredia and isidia. Its elongated lirellae, ranging from 0.4–1.9 mm long and 0.1–0.2 mm wide, often reveal a partially exposed disc with an orange pigment. Distinguishing features of the species include an excipulum that is laterally carbonized, a clear hymenium, and ascospores that are hyaline, transversely septate, and typically measure 40–44 by 8–10 μm.

Despite similar traits shared with species like Graphis hodgesiana, G. tamiamiensis, and G. inversa, such as the laterally carbonized excipulum and clear hymenium, Graphis suzanae sets itself apart with distinct ascospores and its absence of norstictic acid, a common lichen substance. Furthermore, while it shares characteristics with Graphis immersella and G. pinicola, these species are distinguished by the presence or absence of certain compounds and morphological features.

== Habitat and distribution ==
At the time of its original publication, Graphis suzanae had only been recorded in two locations, Maquiné and Caraá, situated within the state of Rio Grande do Sul, southern Brazil. In these places it occurs on tree bark within early successional stages of the Atlantic Forest, a region known for its subtropical humid climate.

== See also ==
- List of Graphis (lichen) species
