= Graphis desquamescens =

Scientific classification
- Kingdom: Fungi
- Division: Ascomycota
- Class: Lecanoromycetes
- Order: Graphidales
- Family: Graphidaceae
- Genus: Graphis
- Species: G. desquamescens

Binomial name
- Graphis desquamescens (Fée) Zahlbr. (1909)

Synonyms
- Opegrapha desquamescens Fée (1874)

Species of lichen-forming fungus

Graphis desquamescens is a species of script lichen in the family Graphidaceae. It has a broad distribution and can be found in various countries including Brazil, Dominica, the United States, Mexico, and Japan. It also occurs in different parts of Australia such as Queensland, New South Wales, Victoria, and Tasmania. It was reported as new to Myanmar in 2020.

There has been little agreement in the literature as to the length of the ascospores in this species; they have been given various ranges extending from 18 μm to as high as 50 μm; the ascospores of the lectotype specimen have a reported range of 25–35 μm.

The novel pigment named graphisquinone was isolated from cultures of the spore-derived mycobionts of this lichen.

== See also ==
- List of Graphis (lichen) species
