= Graphis brahmanensis =

Scientific classification
- Kingdom: Fungi
- Division: Ascomycota
- Class: Lecanoromycetes
- Order: Graphidales
- Family: Graphidaceae
- Genus: Graphis
- Species: G. brahmanensis

Binomial name
- Graphis brahmanensis Aptroot (2009)

Species of lichen-forming fungus

Graphis brahmanensis is a species of script lichen in the family Graphidaceae.

== Taxonomy ==
The species was described in 2009 by André Aptroot, as part of a taxonomic revision of the genus Graphis. The type locality is the Ramu Valley in Madang Province, Papua New Guinea, where the holotype specimen was collected on the branches of a tree in the family Dipterocarpaceae in virgin lowland rainforest at an elevation of 200 m.

It is a typical representative of the Graphis duplicata group, which is characterised by laterally carbonised (blackened and charcoal-like) excipulums, striate (finely lined) lirellae, and transversely septate ascospores. It differs from G. duplicata in producing stictic acid and in having less prominent lirellae. Graphis stenotera is very similar in morphology and chemistry but has an excipulum that is carbonised only at the apex.

== Description ==
The thallus is corticate, smooth to uneven in texture, and white to pale grey in colour. The lirellae are erumpent, have a basal thalline margin, and are elongate with irregular branching. They measure 1–5 mm long by 0.1–0.2 mm wide, and their edges (labia) become striate with age. The excipulum is laterally carbonised, and the hymenium is clear (lacking oil droplets or granules). Each ascus contains eight hyaline ascospores, which are transversely 9–11-septate and measure 20–30 × 4–6 μm. It produces stictic and hypostictic acids as secondary metabolites.

== Habitat and distribution ==
Graphis brahmanensis is known from lowland rainforest in Papua New Guinea, where it grows on branches in undisturbed forest.

== See also ==
- List of Graphis (lichen) species
