= Graphis breussii =

Scientific classification
- Kingdom: Fungi
- Division: Ascomycota
- Class: Lecanoromycetes
- Order: Graphidales
- Family: Graphidaceae
- Genus: Graphis
- Species: G. breussii

Binomial name
- Graphis breussii G.Neuwirth & Lücking (2009)

Species of lichen-forming fungus

Graphis breussii is a species of script lichen in the family Graphidaceae. Found in Venezuela, it was formally described as a new species in 2009 by Gerhard Neuwirth and Robert Lücking. The type specimen was collected by the first author from Samariapo (Región Costa del Orinoco, Amazonas). Here the lichen was found growing on the bark of dead branches of shrubs growing on granite rocks along the eastern banks of the Orinoco river. Characteristics of the lichen include the large, prominent lirellae with striate labia and a thin thalline cover, a completely carbonized (blackened) exciple, and four submuriform (i.e., somewhat chambered) ascospores per ascus. It contains norstictic acid, a lichen product. The specific epithet honours the Austrian lichenologist Othmar Breuss.

== See also ==
- List of Graphis (lichen) species
