= Graphis syzygii =

Scientific classification
- Kingdom: Fungi
- Division: Ascomycota
- Class: Lecanoromycetes
- Order: Graphidales
- Family: Graphidaceae
- Genus: Graphis
- Species: G. syzygii

Binomial name
- Graphis syzygii Aptroot (2009)

Species of lichen-forming fungus

Graphis syzygii is a species of script lichen in the family Graphidaceae. This bark-dwelling lichen forms white to pale grey crusts with distinctive elongate, irregularly branching fruiting structures (lirellae) that have finely lined edges and blackened internal walls. It is known only from Costa Rica, where it grows on tree bark in open meadow habitats within Tenorio Volcano National Park.

== Taxonomy ==
The species was described by André Aptroot in 2009 as part of a large-scale revision and update of the script lichen genus Graphis. The type locality is Volcán Tenorio National Park in Costa Rica, where the holotype specimen was collected on the bark of a Syzygium tree in a meadow at an elevation of 700 m (2,300 ft). It closely resembles Graphis stenotera in morphology and chemistry but differs in having a completely carbonized (blackened) excipulum and an hymenium that is inspersed (filled with minute granules). The few other species that combine striate (finely lined) labia, a completely carbonized excipulum, an inspersed hymenium, and transversely septate ascospores (G. cinerea, G. leucaenae, and G. inspersolongula) differ in having much larger ascospores (75–200 × 15–30 μm).

== Description ==
The thallus is corticate (with a distinct outer cortex), smooth to uneven in texture, and white to pale grey in color. The lirellae are erumpent, with or without a basal thalline margin, and are elongate with irregular branching. They measure 1–5 mm long by 0.2–0.3 mm wide, and their edges (labia) are striate. The excipulum is completely carbonized, and the hymenium is inspersed. Each ascus contains eight hyaline (translucent) ascospores, which are transversely 9–13-septate and measure 25–35 × 5–7 μm.

== Habitat and distribution ==
Graphis syzygii produces stictic acid as a secondary metabolite. It is known from Costa Rica, where it grows on tree bark in open meadow habitats within the range of Tenorio Volcano National Park.

== See also ==
- List of Graphis (lichen) species
