= Graphis argentea =

Scientific classification
- Kingdom: Fungi
- Division: Ascomycota
- Class: Lecanoromycetes
- Order: Graphidales
- Family: Graphidaceae
- Genus: Graphis
- Species: G. argentea

Binomial name
- Graphis argentea Makhija & Adaw. (2005)

Species of lichen-forming fungus

Graphis argentea is a species of script lichen in the family Graphidaceae. Found in the Andaman Islands, it was formally described as a new species in 2005 by Urmila Makhija and Bharati Adawadkar. The type specimen was collected from the beach forest of Elphiston Bay in Long Island Range (Middle Andaman Island). The species epithet argentea (incorrectly spelled argentius in the original publication), is from the Latin argenteus ("silvery"), and refers to the distinctive colour of the thallus.

== See also ==
- List of Graphis (lichen) species
