= Graphis leptocarpoides =

Scientific classification
- Kingdom: Fungi
- Division: Ascomycota
- Class: Lecanoromycetes
- Order: Graphidales
- Family: Graphidaceae
- Genus: Graphis
- Species: G. leptocarpoides

Binomial name
- Graphis leptocarpoides Makhija & Adaw. (2005)

Species of lichen

Graphis leptocarpoides is a species of script lichen in the family Graphidaceae. Found on the Nicobar Islands, it was formally described as a new species in 2005 by Urmila Makhija and Bharati Adawadkar. The type specimen was collected from Kamorta Island. The species epithet, which combines the Ancient Greek leptos ("narrow") with carpos ("fruit"), refers to the thin lirellae.

== See also ==
- List of Graphis (lichen) species
