= Graphis maharashtrana =

Scientific classification
- Kingdom: Fungi
- Division: Ascomycota
- Class: Lecanoromycetes
- Order: Graphidales
- Family: Graphidaceae
- Genus: Graphis
- Species: G. maharashtrana

Binomial name
- Graphis maharashtrana Chitale, Makhija & B.O.Sharma (2011)

Species of lichen-forming fungus

Graphis maharashtrana is a species of script lichen (a crustose lichen with elongated, script-like fruiting bodies) in the family Graphidaceae. Described in 2011 from specimens collected in Maharashtra, India, this corticolous lichen forms a greyish-white crust on bark and is characterised by short, slit-like lirellae (fruiting bodies) with a grooved, laterally blackened exciple and muriform (multi-chambered) ascospores. The species grows in dry deciduous forests and has been recorded from several districts across Maharashtra, where it has been found on the bark of mango trees.

== Taxonomy ==
Graphis maharashtrana was described as new to science in 2011 by Gayatri Chitale, Urmila Makhija and Bharati O. Sharma, based on material collected in Maharashtra, India. The holotype (the single specimen that anchors the name) was collected on 10 October 2000 in Sindhudurg district, along the road from Amboli to Ajra, and is deposited in the Ajrekar Mycological Herbarium (AMH). The species epithet (maharashtrana) refers to the state of Maharashtra.

In the original description, G. maharashtrana was compared with Graphis panhalensis, which has a similar general appearance. G. maharashtrana differs in several features, including an exciple (the dark wall of the fruiting body) that is blackened along the sides rather than mainly at the tip, smaller ascospores (spores), and chemistry: it contains both stictic acid and constictic acid.

== Description ==
The thallus forms a continuous, crust-like growth on bark (crustose and corticolous), with much of it developing within the outer bark (endophloeodal). It is greyish white to off-white, smooth to cracked, and is often edged by a thin black border (a hypothallus).

The fruiting bodies are short lirellae (slit-like apothecia), up to 3 mm long and about 0.1 mm wide. They are simple or branched and usually sit mostly embedded in the thallus, with only a slight rise above the surface. The lirellae are irregularly curved and scattered; their colour ranges from thallus-coloured to black, and their ends are rounded to pointed. The exciple has 4–5 longitudinal grooves and is blackened along the sides (laterally carbonized). It narrows towards the top and is largely covered by a thick thalline margin (a rim of thallus tissue). Crystals are often visible on the surface. Under the microscope, the hymenium (the spore-bearing layer) is clear and not inspersed, and is 34–46 μm tall. Each ascus contains eight spores. Ascospores are colourless and muriform (divided by both cross-walls and lengthwise walls into many small chambers). They are fusiform (spindle-shaped) to oblong and measure 25–42 × 13–17 μm. The spores stain violet in an iodine test, and no gelatinous sheath was observed. Chemical analysis using thin-layer chromatography detected stictic acid and constictic acid.

== Habitat and distribution ==
Graphis maharashtrana is recorded from Maharashtra, India, where it grows on the bark of mango (Mangifera indica) in dry deciduous forest. The original description cites specimens from several parts of the state, including Sindhudurg district (Amboli area), Kolhapur district (Panhala), Nashik district (Anjaneri and Saptashringi), and Pune district (including Bhimashankar, Lonavala–Khandala, Malshej Ghat, and Purandar Fort).

== See also ==
- List of Graphis (lichen) species
