= Graphis insularis =

Scientific classification
- Kingdom: Fungi
- Division: Ascomycota
- Class: Lecanoromycetes
- Order: Graphidales
- Family: Graphidaceae
- Genus: Graphis
- Species: G. insularis

Binomial name
- Graphis insularis Makhija & Adaw. (2005)

Species of lichen-forming fungus

Graphis insularis is a species of script lichen in the family Graphidaceae. Found in the Andaman Islands, it was formally described as a new species in 2005 by Urmila Makhija and Bharati Adawadkar. The type specimen was collected from Guitar Island (near Long Island) (Middle Andaman). The species epithet insularis, from the Latin word for island, refers to the type locality.

The lichen has a yellowish to whitish-grey thallus with a rough and uneven surface texture that cracks with age. A thin, black hypothallus encircles the thallus. The ascomata are in the form of lirellae, which are slender and black, immersed in the substrate, and measure 0.5–9 mm long. These lirellae are either radiately or irregularly branched.

== See also ==
- List of Graphis (lichen) species
