= Graphis dispersa =

Scientific classification
- Kingdom: Fungi
- Division: Ascomycota
- Class: Lecanoromycetes
- Order: Graphidales
- Family: Graphidaceae
- Genus: Graphis
- Species: G. dispersa

Binomial name
- Graphis dispersa Makhija & Adaw. (2005)

Species of lichen-forming fungus

Graphis dispersa is a species of script lichen in the family Graphidaceae. Found on the Nicobar Islands, it was formally described as a new species in 2005 by Urmila Makhija and Bharati Adawadkar. The type specimen was collected from Kamorta Island. The species epithet, derived from the Latin dispersus ("scattered") refers to the scattered lirellae.

== See also ==
- List of Graphis (lichen) species
