= Graphis khaoyaiensis =

Scientific classification
- Kingdom: Fungi
- Division: Ascomycota
- Class: Lecanoromycetes
- Order: Graphidales
- Family: Graphidaceae
- Genus: Graphis
- Species: G. khaoyaiensis

Binomial name
- Graphis khaoyaiensis Poengs. & Lumbsch (2019)

Species of lichen-forming fungus

Graphis khaoyaiensis is a rare species of corticolous (bark-dwelling) script lichen in the family Graphidaceae. Found only in a specific region in Thailand, it closely resembles Graphis dichotoma but can be distinguished by its smaller ascospores and the absence of radiately branched lirellae.

== Taxonomy ==
Graphis khaoyaiensis was formally described as a new species in 2019 by lichenologists Vasun Poengsungnoen and H. Thorsten Lumbsch. The type specimen was collected at Pha Ta Bak waterfall in Khao Yai National Park, Thailand, on the tree bark of Castanopsis acuminatissima. The specific epithet khaoyaiensis refers to the national park where the type specimen was collected.

This species shares some characteristics with both Allographa and Graphis lichens, but according to the authors, it is best placed within the genus Graphis due to its erumpent apothecia, lateral thalline margin, laterally carbonized excipulum, and small to large ascospores.

== Description ==
The thallus of Graphis khaoyaiensis is corticolous, growing up to 6 cm (2.4 in) in diameter and 60–80 μm thick. Its surface is smooth to uneven and whitish in colour. The photobiont associated with this lichen is Trentepohlia, and the medulla is absent. The apothecia are lirelliform, erumpent, straight to curved, and range from simple to sparsely branched. Ascospores are muriform with 6–9 transverse septa and 4–6 longitudinal septa per segment, measuring 15–25 by 9–13 μm.

Graphis khaoyaiensis is similar to Graphis dichotoma but differs in its smaller ascospores and the lack of radiately branched lirellae. Other similar species include Graphis pseudoserpens, Graphis puiggarii, and Graphis khaojoneana, which can be differentiated by their ascospore characteristics.

== Habitat and distribution ==
Graphis khaoyaiensis has been found on the bark of Castanopsis acuminatissima trees in a tropical rainforest at Khao Yai National Park, Thailand. At the time of publication, it was only known to occur in its type locality.

== See also ==
- List of Graphis (lichen) species
