= Graphis distincta =

Scientific classification
- Kingdom: Fungi
- Division: Ascomycota
- Class: Lecanoromycetes
- Order: Graphidales
- Family: Graphidaceae
- Genus: Graphis
- Species: G. distincta

Binomial name
- Graphis distincta Makhija & Adaw. (2005)

Species of lichen-forming fungus

Graphis distincta is a species of script lichen in the family Graphidaceae. Found on the Andaman Islands, it was formally described as a new species in 2005 by Urmila Makhija and Bharati Adawadkar. The type specimen was collected from Port Mount (South Andaman Island). The species epithet distincta, derived from the Latin distinctus ("distinct"), refers to "the distinct species".

The lichen has a greyish-green thallus that is cracked and covered with warts. Its ascomata are in the form of lirellae, which are the same colour as the thallus, and completely immersed in the host tissue, measuring 0.2–3 mm long. Graphis distincta produces ellipsoid-shaped ascospores that contain from 7 to 9 internal transverse septa and measure 21–33 by 4–6 μm. It contains three lichen products: stictic acid, protocetraric acid, and trace amounts of constictic acid. Protocetraric acid is quite rare in the genus Graphis, and it is the presence of this substance that distinguishes this species from the morphologically similar Graphis arecae, a Philippine lookalike described by Edvard Vainio in 1921.

== See also ==
- List of Graphis (lichen) species
