= Graphis flavovirens =

Scientific classification
- Kingdom: Fungi
- Division: Ascomycota
- Class: Lecanoromycetes
- Order: Graphidales
- Family: Graphidaceae
- Genus: Graphis
- Species: G. flavovirens

Binomial name
- Graphis flavovirens Makhija & Adaw. (2005)

Species of lichen-forming fungus

Graphis flavovirens is a species of script lichen in the family Graphidaceae. Found in the Andaman Islands, it was formally described as a new species in 2005 by Urmila Makhija and Bharati Adawadkar. The type specimen was collected from Parlobjig (Middle Andaman Island). The species epithet "flavovirens", which combines the Latin words for yellow and green, refers to the colour of the thallus. Its ascomata (fruiting bodies) are in the form of conspicuous lirellae: they are long and black, with a branching pattern ranging from simple to radiately and profusely branched; this particular branching pattern is known as the centrifuga-morph. G. flavovirens produces ellipsoidal ascospores that have from 3 to 9 transverse septa and measure 16–42 by 4–8 μm. G. flavovirens contains two lichen products: stictic acid and constictic acid.

== See also ==
- List of Graphis (lichen) species
