= Graphis slendrae =

Scientific classification
- Kingdom: Fungi
- Division: Ascomycota
- Class: Lecanoromycetes
- Order: Graphidales
- Family: Graphidaceae
- Genus: Graphis
- Species: G. slendrae

Binomial name
- Graphis slendrae Hale ex Lücking (2009)

Species of lichen-forming fungus

Graphis slendrae is a species of script lichen in the family Graphidaceae. This bark-dwelling lichen forms white to pale grey crusts with distinctive long, radiately branched fruiting structures that have finely lined edges and blackened internal walls. It is known only from the rainforests of Sabah in Malaysian Borneo, where it was originally collected by the lichenologist Mason Hale.

== Taxonomy ==
The species was formally described in 2009 based on an unpublished name by Mason Hale. The type locality is Sabah, Malaysian Borneo, where the holotype specimen was collected by Hale and is housed at the United States National Herbarium (US). The specific epithet refers to the original collector's label name "slendrae". Graphis slendrae is considered most closely related to Graphis dupaxana, with which it shares fruiting structures (lirellae) having a completely carbonised (blackened) excipulum and striate (finely lined) labia, as well as small, transversely septate ascospores and the absence of detectable secondary metabolites. It is distinguished from G. dupaxana by its sessile (directly attached) lirellae, which are much longer and radiately branched, compared with the prominent, shorter, and more sparsely branched lirellae of G. dupaxana.

== Description ==
The thallus is corticate (possessing a defined outer cortex), smooth to uneven in texture, and white to pale grey in colour. The lirellae are prominent, have a basal thalline margin (rim of thallus tissue at the base), and are very long and radiately branched, measuring 1–10 mm in length by 0.1–0.2 mm in width. Their edges (labia) are striate. The excipulum is completely carbonised, and the hymenium (spore-bearing layer) is clear (lacking oil droplets or granules). Each ascus contains eight ascospores, which are hyaline (colourless and translucent), 5–7-septate (divided by transverse walls), and measure 25–35 × 5–7 μm.

== Habitat and distribution ==
No lichen secondary metabolites have been detected in this species. Graphis slendrae is known from Sabah in Malaysian Borneo, where it grows on bark in forested habitats.

== See also ==
- List of Graphis (lichen) species
