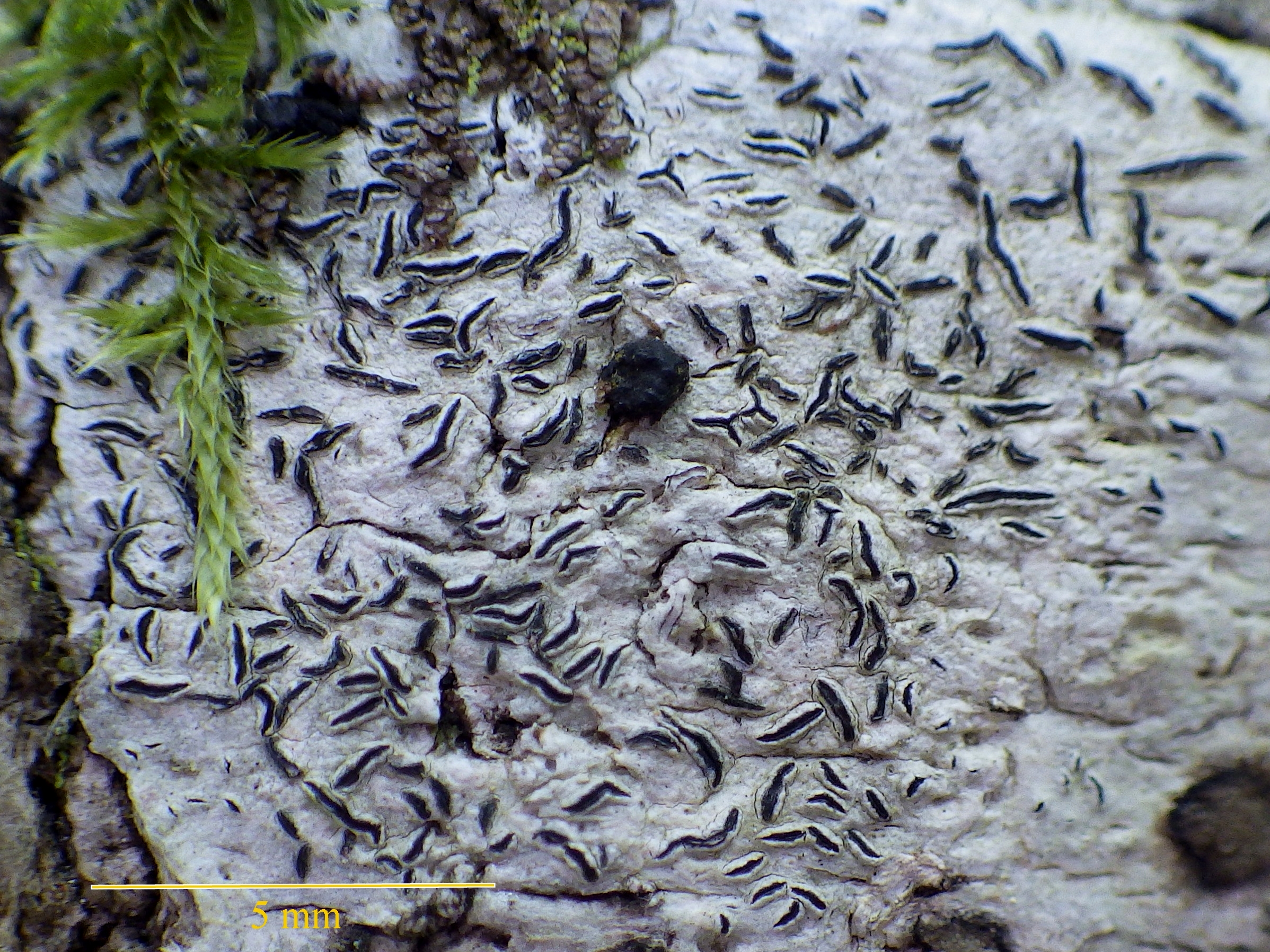
- Photographed in Portugal

Scientific classification
- Kingdom: Fungi
- Division: Ascomycota
- Class: Lecanoromycetes
- Order: Graphidales
- Family: Graphidaceae
- Genus: Graphis
- Species: G. crebra

Binomial name
- Graphis crebra Vain. (1899)

= Graphis crebra =

Species of lichen-forming fungus

Graphis crebra is a species of corticolous lichen in the family Graphidaceae. It has a pantropical distribution. Like other script lichens, it grows on bark and resembles calligraphy. It can be distinguished from several other similar species by the white pruina (powder) on its apothecial discs.

== Taxonomy ==
The lichen was described as new to science in 1899 by Finnish lichenologist Edvard Vainio from a collection made in Gourbeyre, Guadeloupe.

== Description ==
Graphis crebra has a corticate thallus that is dull to somewhat shiny, and pale grey. The lirellae (an ascoma with a long, narrow disc resembling dark squiggly lines) are erumpent (bursting through the surface) with a lateral thalline margin, short, unbranched to rarely one-branched, straight to slightly curved. The apothecial disc becomes exposed very early, with a distinct white pruina (a crystalline or powdery surface covering). The excipulum (a layer of sterile tissue that contains the hymenium) is black. Graphis crebra produces ascospores that are 5–9-septate, and measure 20–30 by 5–8 μm.

The main secondary compound in Graphis crebra is norstictic acid.

=== Similar species ===
Similar species include Graphis cincta, which lacks open pruinose discs, and G. handelii, which does have open discs but is not pruinose. Another lookalike species is the Australian G. streimanii, which has larger spores and lirellae that are longer and more branched. The species G. manipurensis and G.sirohiensis, both known only from Manipur, India, are also similar in appearance to Graphis crebra. The Indian species, however, do not have the white pruinose disc characteristic of G. crebra. Another pantropical, norstictic acid-containing species, Graphis handelii, can be distinguished from G. crebra by its epruinose apothecial discs.

== Habitat and distribution ==
In addition to the type locality in Guadeloupe, Graphis crebra is also known from St. Helena and the Galapagos. In 2011, it was reported from Florida in North America. In 2016, G. crebra was reported from Portugal, which was also a new occurrence for Europe, and in 2017 from the Seychelles.

== See also ==
- List of Graphis (lichen) species
