= Graphis taneina =

Scientific classification
- Kingdom: Fungi
- Division: Ascomycota
- Class: Lecanoromycetes
- Order: Graphidales
- Family: Graphidaceae
- Genus: Graphis
- Species: G. taneina

Binomial name
- Graphis taneina M.Nakan., Kashiw. & K.H.Moon (2011)
- Holotype: Angkor ruins, Siem Reap, Cambodia

Species of lichen-forming fungus

Graphis taneina is a species of script lichen in the family Graphidaceae. It forms a thin, pale greenish-grey crust on tree bark and produces both powdery patches (soredia) and elongated, slit-like fruiting bodies. The species is known from the Angkor temple complex in Cambodia, where it grows on various trees in well-lit sites.

== Taxonomy ==
Graphis taneina was described as a new species in 2011 by Minoru Nakanishi, Hiroyuki Kashiwadani, and Kwang Hee Moon from material collected on tree bark near the Ta Nei stone temple in the Angkor area of Siem Reap Province, Cambodia. The holotype is housed in the herbarium of the National Museum of Nature and Science (TNS).

The authors distinguished the species from similar members of Graphis by a combination of morphology and chemistry: the thallus produces soredia (powdery vegetative propagules), the lirellae (elongate, slit-like apothecia) are erumpent (breaking through the surface) and usually lack obvious striations, the exciple is carbonised near the top, and the colourless ascospores have 6–8 transverse septa and measure 30–32 × 7–8 micrometres (μm). It contains 2-methoxypsoromic acid, which helps separate it from lookalikes such as G. bulacana and G. glaucescens (both lacking soredia and lacking detected lichen substances), and from G. supracola (with laterally carbonised exciples and protocetraric acid).

== Description ==
The thallus of Graphis taneina is corticolous (growing on bark), pale greenish-grey to whitish-grey, thin, and lacks a distinct outer cortex. It is partly sorediate, forming farinose (mealy) soralia that are hemispherical to irregular in shape and about 40–100 μm across.

The fruiting bodies are simple to sparingly branched lirellae up to 4 mm long and 0.18–0.3 mm wide. They are erumpent from the thallus and are largely bordered by a thalline margin almost to the top. The labia are entire to occasionally grooved (striate), and they are covered with white pruina (a frosted, powdery bloom). Internally, the exciple (the tissue supporting the fruiting bodies) is carbonised near the top (about 25–40 μm thick there), the hymenium is clear (not inspersed) and iodine-negative, and the asci contain eight spores. The colourless ascospores are 6–8-septate and stain purple with iodine (I+), measuring 30–32 × 7–8 μm. The lichen contains 2-methoxypsoromic acid, a rare secondary metabolite in the genus Graphis.

== Habitat and distribution ==
In the publication that described it, Graphis taneina is documented from the Angkor area of Siem Reap Province in Cambodia, with collections made around Ta Nei Temple at about 30 m elevation. It grows on tree bark and is fairly common in the survey area, occurring on several kinds of trees including Ficus, Planchonia, and Tetrameles (among others); it favours well-lit (sun-exposed) bark. Graphis taneina is one of five Graphis species that have been documented from Ta Nei Temple and surrounding areas; the others are G. cambodiensis, G. chlorotica, G. glaucescens, and G. supracola.

== See also ==
- List of Graphis (lichen) species
