= Graphis bungartzii =

Scientific classification
- Kingdom: Fungi
- Division: Ascomycota
- Class: Lecanoromycetes
- Order: Graphidales
- Family: Graphidaceae
- Genus: Graphis
- Species: G. bungartzii

Binomial name
- Graphis bungartzii A.B.Peña, Lücking, Herrera-Camp. & R.Miranda (2014)
- Type locality: Chamela-Cuixmala Biosphere Reserve, Mexico

Species of lichen-forming fungus

Graphis bungartzii is a species of bark-dwelling script lichen in the family Graphidaceae. Described in 2014 from specimens collected in Jalisco, Mexico, this lichen forms a pale greenish-grey crust on tree bark in seasonally dry tropical forests. The species is characterised by its branched, slit-like fruiting bodies (lirellae) with black, grooved lips, small ascospores divided by cross-walls, and the presence of norstictic and connorstictic acids.

== Taxonomy ==
Graphis bungartzii was formally described as a new species in 2014, based on specimens collected at the Chamela Biological Station in the Chamela-Cuixmala Biosphere Reserve, Jalisco, Mexico. The species is distinguished from similar members of Graphis by several features: its branched, slit-like fruiting bodies (lirellae) that break through the surface (erumpent) and have a rim of thallus tissue along the sides (lateral thalline margin); lips (labia) that develop grooves; a fruiting body wall (exciple) that is blackened (carbonized) along the sides; small ascospores divided by cross-walls (transversely septate); and the presence of the chemical compounds norstictic and connorstictic acids. The species name (epithet) honours Frank Bungartz.

== Description ==
The thallus grows on bark and forms a continuous crust 2–5 cm (0.8–2.0 in) across and up to about 150 μm thick. Its surface is smooth and pale greenish-gray, without a distinct prothallus. In section, it has a cartilaginous upper cortex, an irregular algal layer, and conspicuous clusters of calcium oxalate crystals.

The apothecia are lirelliform, flexuose, often branched, and erumpent, with the disc concealed. The labia are black and striate, and the exciple is laterally carbonized; the hymenium is clear (not inspersed). Ascospores are colorless, eight per ascus, ellipsoid to fusiform, transversely 5–11-septate, and measure about 25–38 × 5–8 μm. Thin-layer chromatography detects norstictic and connorstictic acids (thallus K+ yellow turning red).

== Habitat and distribution ==
Graphis bungartzii is known from low elevations in seasonally tropical dry forest in Jalisco, Mexico, in and around the Chamela-Cuixmala Biosphere Reserve. The type locality, about 59 m (194 ft) elevation, is described as a transition between dry forest and taller, more humid semideciduous vegetation along arroyos.

At the type locality it was found on the bark of Croton and Thouinia (including Thouinia paucidentata). Additional specimens were collected at other dry-forest sites roughly 2–135 km (1.2–83.9 mi) from the type locality, at about 50–300 m (160–980 ft) elevation.

== See also ==
- List of Graphis (lichen) species
