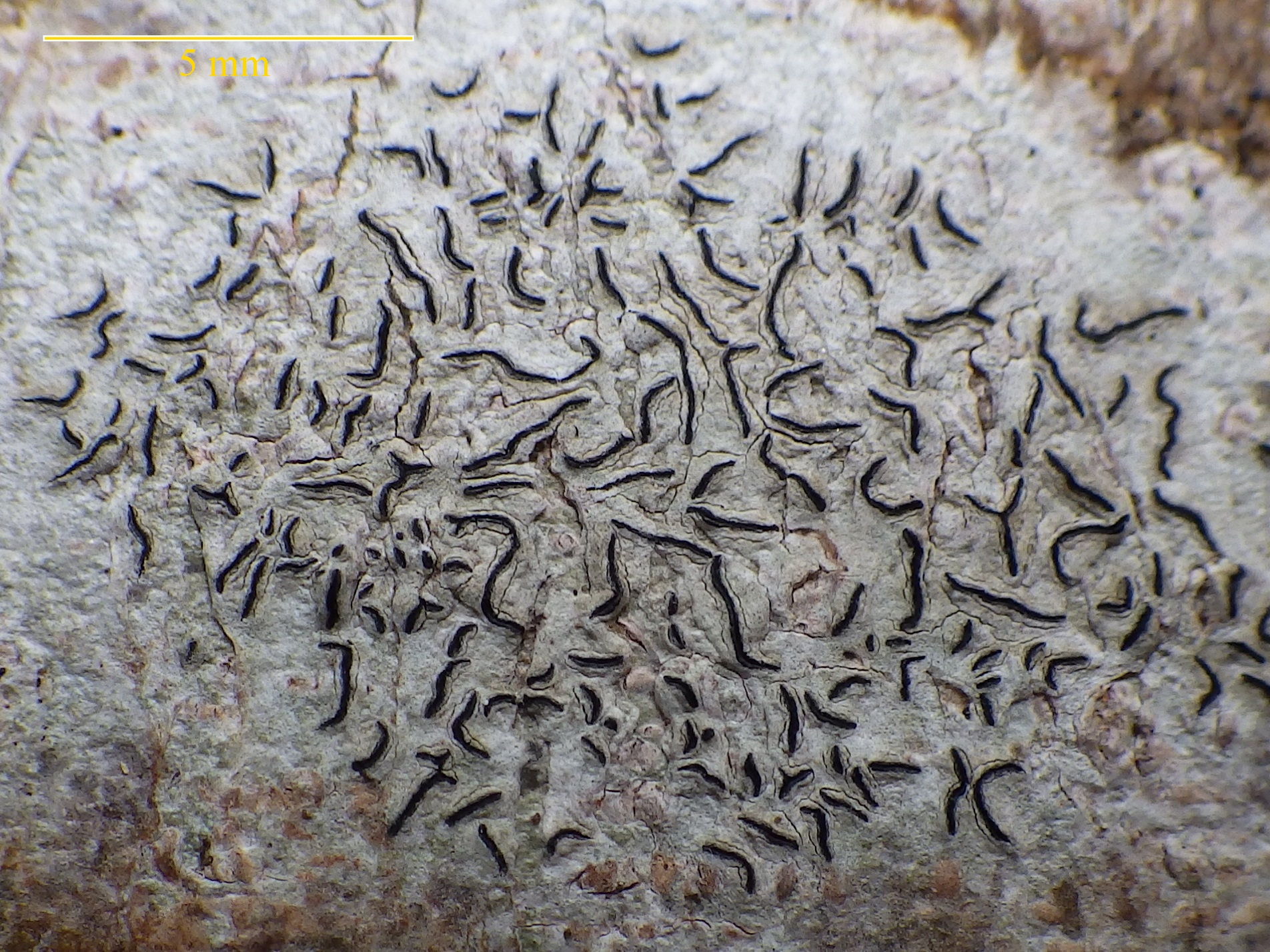
- in Sintra, Portugal

Scientific classification
- Kingdom: Fungi
- Division: Ascomycota
- Class: Lecanoromycetes
- Order: Graphidales
- Family: Graphidaceae
- Genus: Graphis
- Species: G. plumierae

Binomial name
- Graphis plumierae Vain. (1915)

= Graphis plumierae =

Species of lichen-forming fungus

Graphis plumierae is a species of script lichen in the family Graphidaceae. It was described as new to science in 1915 by Finnish mycologist Edvard Vainio. The type was collected in Gourbeyre, Guadeloupe. In 2016, G. plumierae was reported from an oak forest in the Sintra Mountains, Portugal, which was also a new occurrence for Europe. It has also been documented from the Miranda region of Pantanal, Brazil.

== Description ==
Graphis plumierae has labia that are white-pruinose. The lirellae (these are ascomata with a long, narrow disc resembling dark squiggly lines), which are immersed in the substrate, have a lateral thalline margin. The lichen contains the secondary compounds norstictic acid, stictic, and salazinic acid. It grows on bark.

The reproductive structures, called lirellae, appear as thin, elongated lineola-morph structures resembling script marks. These lirellae have smooth surfaces without striations. Their excipulum (outer protective layer) is carbonized (blackened) only laterally, not completely encircling the structure. The hymenium (spore-producing layer) has an inspersed appearance due to tiny droplets that create a cloudy look under microscopic examination. The lirellae are sometimes branched, and their discs remain closed. The ascospores are colourless, typical of the genus.

The ascospores of G. plumierae have 7–10 cross-walls (septa) dividing them into segments. They measure between 26.5 and 43.3 micrometres (μm) in length (with an average range of 32.5–39.9 μm) and between 6.4 and 7.9 μm in width (with an average range of 6.9–7.8 μm). The length-to-width ratio of these spores falls between 4.1 and 6.1 times as long as wide (averaging 4.3–5.6).

== See also ==
- List of Graphis (lichen) species
