= Graphis lueckingii =

Scientific classification
- Kingdom: Fungi
- Division: Ascomycota
- Class: Lecanoromycetes
- Order: Graphidales
- Family: Graphidaceae
- Genus: Graphis
- Species: G. lueckingii

Binomial name
- Graphis lueckingii Dal-Forno & Eliasaro (2010)

Species of lichen-forming fungus

Graphis lueckingii is a species of script lichen in the family Graphidaceae. Found in southern Brazil, it was fornally described as a new species in 2010 by Manuela Dal-Forno and Sionara Eliasaro. The type specimen was collected by the first author in the Pontal do Paraná, where it was found growing on bark in a forest restinga. The species epithet honours lichenologist Robert Lücking.

Graphis lueckingii can be identified by its sorediate thallus, prominent lirellae featuring thin and complete thalline margins, a distinct clear hymenium, completely carbonized excipulum, small ascospores that are trans-septate and range from 20 to 23 μm in length, and the presence of norstictic acid. Graphis lueckingii shares some features with G. intricata and G. caesiocarpa, but both of these species lack soredia.

== See also ==
- List of Graphis (lichen) species
