= Graphis paradussii =

Scientific classification
- Kingdom: Fungi
- Division: Ascomycota
- Class: Lecanoromycetes
- Order: Graphidales
- Family: Graphidaceae
- Genus: Graphis
- Species: G. paradussii

Binomial name
- Graphis paradussii Z.F.Jia (2011)
- Type locality: Mt. Jianfenglin, Hainan, China

Species of lichen-forming fungus

Graphis paradussii is a species of script lichen in the family Graphidaceae. It forms a pale grey crust on tree bark and produces short, black, slit-like fruiting bodies. The species is known only from tropical rainforest on Hainan Island in southern China.

== Taxonomy ==
Graphis paradussii was described as new to science in 2011 by Ze-Feng Jia during a revision of Graphis in China, based on material collected on tree bark from Mount Jianfengling in Hainan, at about 910 m elevation.

Jia placed the species in the Graphis-group (using the taxonomic framework established Lücking and colleagues in their 2009 world-wide key to the genus), whose members typically have short, unbranched apothecia forming prominent lirellae (elongate, slit-like apothecia) with thick thalline margins and a darkened (carbonized) exciple, and often contain detectable secondary metabolites. The epithet paradussii refers to its resemblance to Graphis dussii; G. paradussii differs by having longer, more highly septate ascospores and by containing salazinic acid as well as norstictic acid. It is also similar to Graphis cleistoblephara, but that species has muriform (multi-chambered) ascospores and lacks salazinic acid.

== Description ==
The thallus of Graphis paradussii is a pale grey crust growing on bark (corticolous). It has a smooth surface, is unevenly thickened, and is tightly attached to the substrate. Vegetative propagules isidia and soralia are absent.

The fruiting bodies are black, unbranched lirellae that are very short (typically 0.5–1 mm long and 0.4–0.6 mm wide) and scattered across the thallus; they are prominent to sessile and have a lateral thalline margin. The labia are convergent and not striate, and the disc is concealed. The exciple is conspicuous and laterally carbonized. Microscopically, the hymenium is colourless and not inspersed (without granular inclusions), and the asci are eight-spored. The ascospores are hyaline, oblong to ellipsoid, distinctly halonate (surrounded by a clear halo), and transversely septate into 23–30 compartments, measuring 90–145 × 7–13 μm. Thso spores stain violet in iodine (I+ violet). Thin-layer chromatography detected norstictic acid and salazinic acid in the thallus.

== Habitat and distribution ==
Graphis paradussii is known only from its type locality on Mount Jianfengling, Hainan Island, China, where it grows on bark in tropical rainforest. The site is described as the largest remaining tropical rainforest in China.

== See also ==
- List of Graphis (lichen) species
