= Graphis sitapurensis =

Scientific classification
- Kingdom: Fungi
- Division: Ascomycota
- Class: Lecanoromycetes
- Order: Graphidales
- Family: Graphidaceae
- Genus: Graphis
- Species: G. sitapurensis

Binomial name
- Graphis sitapurensis Makhija & Adaw. (2005)

Species of lichen-forming fungus

Graphis sitapurensis is a species of script lichen in the family Graphidaceae. Found on the Andaman Islands, it was formally described as a new species in 2005 by Urmila Makhija and Bharati Adawadkar. The type specimen was collected from a moist deciduous forest in Sitapur (Diglipur Range, North Andaman Island). The species epithet refers to the type locality. The ascomata (fruiting bodies) of the lichen are in the form of lirellae, which are elongated and irregularly branched with a concealed disc; this particular set of characteristics is known as the deserpens-morph.

== See also ==
- List of Graphis (lichen) species
