= Graphis paraschiffneri =

Scientific classification
- Kingdom: Fungi
- Division: Ascomycota
- Class: Lecanoromycetes
- Order: Graphidales
- Family: Graphidaceae
- Genus: Graphis
- Species: G. paraschiffneri

Binomial name
- Graphis paraschiffneri Lücking & Breuss (2015)

Species of lichen-forming fungus

Graphis paraschiffneri is a little-known species of corticolous (bark-dwelling) script lichen in the family Graphidaceae. It is only known to occur in Nicaragua. Closely related to Graphis schiffneri, the lichen is distinguished from this lookalike by its longer ascospores with more septa (internal partitions) and extended lirellae (fruiting bodies).

== Taxonomy ==
Graphis paraschiffneri was formally described as a new species in 2015 by the lichenologists Robert Lücking and Othmar Breuss. First identified in Nicaragua, near the Pacific coast at Playa El Coco, about 18 km (11 mi) south of San Juan del Sur, the type specimen was collected by the second author on 19 July 2001. The species epithet alludes to its similarity with Graphis schiffneri.

== Description ==
The thallus of Graphis paraschiffneri is epiperidermal (i.e., growing on the surface of the bark substrate, rather than in it), with a thickness of 100–150 micrometres (μm). It has a greyish-white, smooth, and slightly rimose (cracked) appearance, thinly coated with a cortex containing an irregular algal layer and calcium oxalate crystals. It lacks a prothallus. The lirellae, which are the fruiting structures, are immersed to erumpent, typically measuring 1.5–3.0 mm in length and about 0.25 mm in width. They are either simple or sparsely branched and has a lateral thalline margin. The labia are entire to slightly furrowed at the tips, with free and black, non-pruinose tips; the disc remains concealed. The excipulum is completely carbonised, measuring 230–280 μm in width and 170–200 μm in height. The hypothecium is approximately 20 μm tall and colourless, while the clear hymenium is 90–120 μm tall. The paraphyses are unbranched and hyaline (transclucent), and the epihymenium is granulose and grey-brown. The ascospores, numbering eight per ascus, are colourless, and stain violet-blue with iodine. Spores are elongated, measuring 30–42 (sometimes up to 50) by 7.5–8.5 μm, and have 10 to 14 locules.

Graphis paraschiffneri contains norstictic acid, as detected by thin-layer chromatography. Spot tests on the thallus yield reactions of C−, P−, and K+ (yellow turning slowly to orange-red).

=== Similar species ===
Graphis paraschiffneri shares characteristics with G. schiffneri in terms of norstictic acid presence, slightly striate labia, a completely carbonised excipulum, and transversely septate ascospores. It is distinct due to its longer lirellae and larger ascospores. Another related species, Graphis caesiocarpa, differs in having richly branched lirellae and entire, white-pruinose labia with a complete thalline cover. While G. caesiocarpa has similarly sized spores, these spores have fewer septa (7–10) compared to those of G. paraschiffneri.

== Habitat and distribution ==
This lichen species is found growing on tree bark in the Pacific coastal region of Nicaragua. At the time of its original publication, it was known to occur exclusively at the type locality. As of 2023, it is one of 319 lichen species that have been recorded in Nicaragua.

== See also ==
- List of Graphis (lichen) species
