= Graphis caribica =

Scientific classification
- Kingdom: Fungi
- Division: Ascomycota
- Class: Lecanoromycetes
- Order: Graphidales
- Family: Graphidaceae
- Genus: Graphis
- Species: G. caribica

Binomial name
- Graphis caribica Lücking (2011)

Species of lichen-forming fungus

Graphis caribica is a species of lichen in the family Graphidaceae. Originally described from a specimen collected in the Dominican Republic in 1963, it has since been found in several tropical and subtropical regions including Costa Rica, Florida, the Philippines, and Sri Lanka, where it grows in open woodlands. The lichen forms thin yellowish-green crusts on tree bark and produces distinctive script-like reproductive structures that twist and branch across the surface.

== Taxonomy ==
Graphis caribica was formally described in 2012 by Robert Lücking from a Dominican collection gathered by Henry Andrew Imshaug in 1963. The epithet reflects the species' centre of occurrence in the circum-Caribbean region. Within the large script lichen genus Graphis it belongs to the group characterised by prominent lirellae (elongate fruiting bodies) that lack a thalline rim and have at least the upper part of the apothecial wall (excipulum) carbonised—that is, impregnated with dark, graphite-like pigment. It is morphologically closest to G. fournieri, but that species has a completely carbonised excipulum and develops brick-walled (muriform) spores, whereas G. caribica shows carbonisation only at the top of the excipulum and produces narrower, purely transversely-septate spores. No lichen substances were detected by thin-layer chromatography, a feature that further helps separate the new taxon from chemically distinct members of its genus.

== Description ==
The lichen forms a thin, continuous crust up to about 5 cm across on tree bark. Viewed from above the surface is uneven and yellow-green and lacks a dark prothallus line. In vertical section the outer "skin" (cortex) is cartilaginous; beneath it lies a patchy layer of green algal cells and conspicuous clumps of colourless crystals, then a white medulla.

Fruiting bodies are conspicuous script-like lirellae 1–5 mm long and 0.3–0.4 mm wide that twist flexuously and branch sparsely. They emerge well above the thallus surface and show no enveloping thalline margin; instead the true margin (labia) is thick, pale and longitudinally striate, while the disc itself remains concealed. Microscopic examination reveals a scalloped (crenulate) excipulum that is jet-black only around the summit but grades to pale yellow-orange at the sides and base. The hymenium is clear, 120–150 μm tall, and surmounted by a finely granular olive-brown cap (epithecium). Each club-shaped ascus contains eight colourless, elongated ascospores 50–65 × 9–12 μm, divided by 9–15 cross-walls; there are no longitudinal walls. Standard chemistry is negative (no spot test reactions; no compounds detected with thin-layer chromatography).

== Habitat and distribution ==
Graphis caribica has been recorded from Dominica, Florida, several seasonally dry to subtropical‐forest sites in Costa Rica, as well as from the Philippines and Sri Lanka. The Dominican type specimen grew on open tree bark at about 300 m elevation; the altitudes of the remaining collections were not recorded, but all come from warm, lowland to lower-montane woodland.

== See also ==
- List of Graphis (lichen) species
