= Graphis marusae =

Scientific classification
- Kingdom: Fungi
- Division: Ascomycota
- Class: Lecanoromycetes
- Order: Graphidales
- Family: Graphidaceae
- Genus: Graphis
- Species: G. marusae

Binomial name
- Graphis marusae B.Peña & Lücking (2011)
- Holotype: Los Tuxtlas Biosphere Reserve, Mexico

Species of lichen-forming fungus

Graphis marusae is a species of corticolous (bark-dwelling) crustose lichen in the family Graphidaceae. It is found in a relict tropical lowland rainforest in Veracruz, Mexico, growing in exposed understory.

== Taxonomy ==
The lichen-forming fungus was described as new to science in 2011 by the lichenologists Alejandrina Peña and Robert Lücking. The type specimen was collected by Bárcenas Peña from the Los Tuxtlas Biosphere Reserve at an elevation of 345 m (1,132 ft), where it was growing in a lowland rainforest on the bark of Astrocaryum mexicanum and Pseudolmedia oxyphyllaria. It is characterised by its green thallus, its 1–5 mm-long lirellae (elongated and slit-like fruiting bodies) with grey-black labia.

== Description ==
The thallus of Graphis marusae reaches up to 5 cm (2 in) in diameter with a thickness of 50–100 μm. The surface of the thallus is smooth, shiny, and pale greenish-grey in colour. There is no prothallus (the initial growth stage or outer layer). In cross-section, the thallus has a cartilaginous (firm and tough) upper cortex, an irregular layer of algae, and clusters of crystals.

The apothecia (fruiting bodies) of Graphis marusae are lirelliform (elongated and slit-like) and flexuose (curved or twisted), typically unbranched, and prominent on the surface. They measure 1–5 mm in length, 0.2–0.3 mm in width, and 0.2–0.25 mm in height. The disc of the apothecia is concealed, with a thick proper margin (border) that initially remains smooth but eventually becomes striate (striped). The thalline margin (the part of the thallus surrounding the apothecium) is indistinct, thin, and ranges from basal to almost lateral, greenish-grey in colour. The grey-black labia (edges of the proper margin) are almost fully exposed.

The excipulum (the cup-like structure around the apothecium) is completely carbonised (blackened and hardened), measuring 80–120 μm in width, and can be entire (smooth) to apically crenulate (scalloped at the top). The excipulum is basally covered by a thin layer of the thallus. The hypothecium (layer beneath the hymenium) is prosoplectenchymatous (composed of elongated, interwoven cells), 10–20 μm high, and colourless. The hymenium (spore-producing layer) is 100–150 μm high, colourless, and clear, while the epithecium (uppermost layer of the hymenium) is indistinct.

The paraphyses (sterile filaments among the spores) are unbranched. The asci (spore sacs) are fusiform (spindle-shaped), measuring 90–120 by 25–35 μm. Each ascus contains 8 ascospores, which are oblong, 9–13-septate (divided by transverse septa), measuring 50–70 by 10–15 μm, and are 4–5 times as long as they are wide. The ascospores are colourless. No secondary metabolites were detected in Graphis marusae using thin-layer chromatography.

== See also ==
- List of Graphis (lichen) species
