= Graphis appendiculata =

Scientific classification
- Kingdom: Fungi
- Division: Ascomycota
- Class: Lecanoromycetes
- Order: Graphidales
- Family: Graphidaceae
- Genus: Graphis
- Species: G. appendiculata

Binomial name
- Graphis appendiculata Common & Lücking (2011)

Species of lichen-forming fungus

Graphis appendiculata is a species of bark-dwelling crustose lichen in the family Graphidaceae. It is known from subtropical Florida. It forms a pale, smooth thallus with dark, finely grooved lirellae (slit-like fruiting structures) that often narrow abruptly toward the ends.

== Taxonomy ==
Graphis appendiculata was described as a new species in 2011 by Ralph Common and Robert Lücking (MycoBank no. 560009). The holotype (Common 7313A) was collected in April 1997 in Fakahatchee Strand Preserve State Park (Collier County, Florida), along the Scenic Drive (CR 837) near gate 14 in second-growth habitat. It is deposited in the herbarium of the Michigan State University Museum (MSC).

The species epithet appendiculata refers to the shape of the lirellae: they become abruptly narrower and more entire toward their tips, giving them an "appendage-like" appearance. Because Graphis includes many species that look very similar, it can be difficult to determine whether a specimen matches an already named species. However, no previously described species was found to match this well-represented taxon from Fakahatchee.

== Description ==
The thallus of Graphis appendiculata grows on bark, typically 1–3 cm (0.4–1.2 in) across and about 50–100 μm thick. It forms a continuous crust with a smooth surface that is white to pale gray, and it contains a trentepohlioid photobiont (Trentepohlia-type alga). In cross-section, the thallus has a prosoplectenchymatous upper cortex, an irregular algal layer, and conspicuous clusters of crystals.

The lirellae are flexuose (wavy) and irregularly branched, often arranged in radiating lines. They range from immersed to erumpent (breaking through the thallus surface) and are typically 3–7 mm long, about 0.1–0.2 mm wide (becoming abruptly thinner at the ends), and about 0.15–0.2 mm high. The disk is concealed. The labia (the "lips" bordering the slit) are finely but distinctly grooved (striate) and appear black to dark gray, and the thalline margin is white to pale gray. Microscopically, the excipulum is crenulate and apically carbonized (blackened), while the lateral and basal parts are orange-brown; the hymenium is clear. The asci contain eight oblong ascospores that are 9–13-septate and about 40–60 × 9–13 μm; The spores are I+ (staining violet-blue in an iodine test). No lichen substances were detected by thin-layer chromatography.

== Habitat and distribution ==
The species was among the most frequently collected Graphis taxa in Fakahatchee Strand Preserve State Park. It was not reported from outside the area in the original paper, suggesting it may have a restricted local distribution. It occurs mainly on small hardwood branches in partially exposed microhabitats.

Collections from different periods differed in fertility. Material collected during the March 2009 Tuckerman Workshop (a field-based lichen-identification and collecting meeting) was almost always sterile, whereas collections made by Common in April 1997 were abundantly fertile. This pattern was interpreted as possible seasonality or longer-term periodicity in ascospore production. The species does not key out in Richard C. Harris' Florida treatment, and it was compared with several morphologically similar Graphis species, including members of the G. proserpens–G. subtenella complex.

== See also ==
- List of Graphis (lichen) species
