= Graphis makhijae =

Scientific classification
- Kingdom: Fungi
- Division: Ascomycota
- Class: Lecanoromycetes
- Order: Graphidales
- Family: Graphidaceae
- Genus: Graphis
- Species: G. makhijae

Binomial name
- Graphis makhijae R.Adhikari & Nayaka (2025)

Synonyms
- Hemithecium fulvescens Adaw. & Makhija (2005); Graphis fulvescens (Adaw. & Makhija) Lücking & Kalb (2018)

Species of lichen-forming fungus

Graphis makhijae is a species of lichen-forming fungus in the family Graphidaceae. It was first described from India in 2005 under the name Hemithecium fulvescens and later transferred to the genus Graphis; in 2025, the replacement name G. makhijae was proposed to resolve a later homonym.

== Systematics ==
Graphis makhijae was introduced in 2025 by Rakesh Adhikari and Sanjeeva Nayaka as a replacement name (nomen novum) for Hemithecium fulvescens Adaw. & Makhija, a species described from India in 2005. In 2018, the species was transferred to Graphis as Graphis fulvescens (Adaw. & Makhija) Lücking & Kalb, but that name is illegitimate because Graphis fulvescens had already been published for a different species. The replacement epithet honours Urmila Makhija, one of the original authors of the basionym.

The type specimen was collected in India (Karnataka, South Canara, Hogga, foothills of Charmudi ghat, on the Mangalore–Mudigere road) on 3 January 1976 by C.R. Kulkarni; the holotype is kept in the Agharkar Research Institute Herbarium in Pune, Maharashtra, India (AMH).

== Description ==
The thallus is dull yellow, rough, cracked, and unevenly thickened, and bordered by a thin black hypothallus. The lirellae (elongate, slit-like fruiting bodies) are the same colour as the thallus and measure about 0.5–6 mm long; they may be simple or branched, and are immersed to slightly raised. Ascospores are ellipsoidal and trans-septate (with 9–12 cross-walls), measuring 29–42 × 4–6 μm.

In standard spot tests, the thallus reacts K+ (red) and P+ (orange), and thin-layer chromatography shows protocetraric acid together with stictic and constictic acids. The original authors compared the species to H. laubertianum on the basis of exciple characters and ascospore size, but distinguished it by its lichen substances (reported as absent from H. laubertianum). It has been collected on roadside trees in primary broad-leaved rainforest in South Canara (Karnataka), with additional collections reported from other localities in Karnataka.

== See also ==
- List of Graphis (lichen) species
