= List of Graphis (lichen) species =

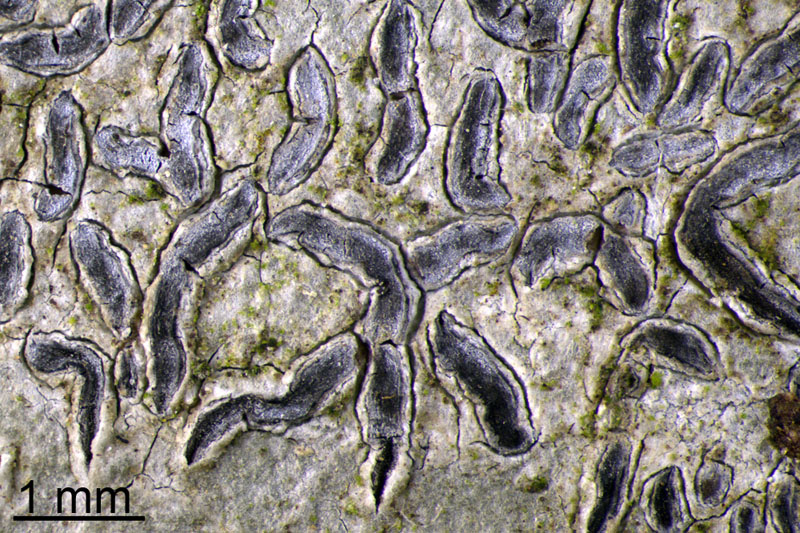
Graphis scripta is the type species of genus Graphis.

This is a list of species in the genus Graphis, a lichen-forming fungal genus in the family Graphidaceae. Species of Graphis are crustose lichens that form thin, often pale grey or greenish patches on bark (and less often rock), with elongated, slit-like fruiting bodies that trace dark, sometimes branching lines across the surface—an appearance that inspired the common name "script lichens". Graphis is widespread but especially diverse in tropical and subtropical regions, and it was established in 1763 by the French naturalist Michel Adanson.

As of February 2026, Species Fungorum (in the Catalogue of Life) accepts 300 species of Graphis. This article compiles those currently accepted species names; because the genus is actively revised, it is a snapshot that changes as names are synonymized, reinstated, or transferred between genera. Studies using molecular phylogenetics have shown that the traditional, broader use of Graphis grouped together more than one evolutionary lineage, leading to extensive reclassification within Graphidaceae. One major outcome has been the reinstatement of Allographa for a separate script lichen lineage (formalised in 2018), and other former Graphis species have also been reassigned to genera such as Carbacanthographis and Diorygma. Species totals therefore vary with the source consulted—for example, a global key published in 2009 accepted 330 species of Graphis and listed a further 205 names as synonyms—so any list reflects both the taxonomic scope and the date of the underlying classification.

== A ==
- Graphis abapha Nyl. (1889)
- Graphis acervulans Fée (1874)
- Graphis alba J.C.Dantas, Lücking & M.Cáceres (2017)
- Graphis albidofarinacea Adaw. & Makhija (2006)
- Graphis albidula Fée (1874)
- Graphis albinula Müll.Arg. (1880)
- Graphis albissima Müll.Arg. (1895)
- Graphis albocarpa J.Kalb, Lücking & Kalb (2018)
- Graphis albocolpata M.Nakan. & H.Harada (1999)
- Graphis alboglaucescens Adaw. & Makhija (2007)
- Graphis albothallina R.Adhikari & Nayaka (2025) – India
- Graphis allugallenensis Weerakoon, Wijey. & Lücking (2012)
- Graphis alpestris (Zahlbr.) Staiger (2002)
- Graphis amaliana Amórtegui, B.Moncada & Lücking (2019)
- Graphis analoga Nyl. (1859)
- Graphis andamanica Swarnal. (2017)
- Graphis anfractuosa (Eschw.) Eschw. (1833)
- Graphis anguilliformis Taylor (1847)
- Graphis annulata Kremp. (1876)
- Graphis aperiens Müll.Arg. (1891)
- Graphis aperta Fée (1874)
- Graphis apertella A.W.Archer (2001)
- Graphis aphaneomicrospora (Makhija & Adaw.) J.Kalb & Kalb (2017)
- Graphis aphanes Mont. & Bosch (1856)
- Graphis apoda (Zahlbr.) Lücking (2009)
- Graphis appendiculata Common & Lücking (2011)
- Graphis arbusculiformis (Vain.) Lücking (2012)
- Graphis archeri Dal-Forno & Eliasaro (2009)
- Graphis arecae Vain. (1921)
- Graphis argentea Makhija & Adaw. (2005)
- Graphis assimilis Nyl. (1868)
- Graphis astraea Tuck. (1858)
- Graphis aterrima Müll.Arg. (1894)
- Graphis atroflava Fée (1825)
- Graphis atrorubens Tuck. (1933)
- Graphis atrosanguinea Zenker (1829)
- Graphis aurantiaca Zenker (1829)
- Graphis australosiamensis Sutjar. & Kalb (2014)
- Graphis awaensis Vain. (1921)
- Graphis awasthii Kr.P.Singh & Swarnal. (2008)

== B ==
- Graphis bakeri Vain. (1921)
- Graphis balaghatensis (Adaw. & Makhija) J.Kalb & Kalb (2017)
- Graphis balansana Müll.Arg. (1888)
- Graphis batanensis Vain. (1921)
- Graphis beaumontii Tuck. (1888)
- Graphis bernadetiae van den Boom & Sipman (2014)
- Graphis bicolor Fée (1825)
- Graphis bicrenatula Redinger (1935)
- Graphis bipartita (Müll.Arg.) Lücking (2008)
- Graphis bogoriensis Zahlbr. (1904)
- Graphis boliviana Kukwa & Flakus (2013)
- Graphis borealis (A.W.Archer) A.W.Archer (2005)
- Graphis botryosa Tuck. (1888)
- Graphis bougainvilleae Zahlbr. (1913)
- Graphis brachycarpa Müll.Arg. (1882)
- Graphis brahmanensis Aptroot (2009)
- Graphis breussii G.Neuwirth & Lücking (2009)
- Graphis brevicarpa M.Nakan., Kashiw. & K.H.Moon (2002)
- Graphis brittoniae Seavey & J.Seavey (2011)
- Graphis bulacana Vain. (1921)
- Graphis bungartzii A.B.Peña, Lücking, Herrera-Camp. & R.Miranda (2014)

== C ==
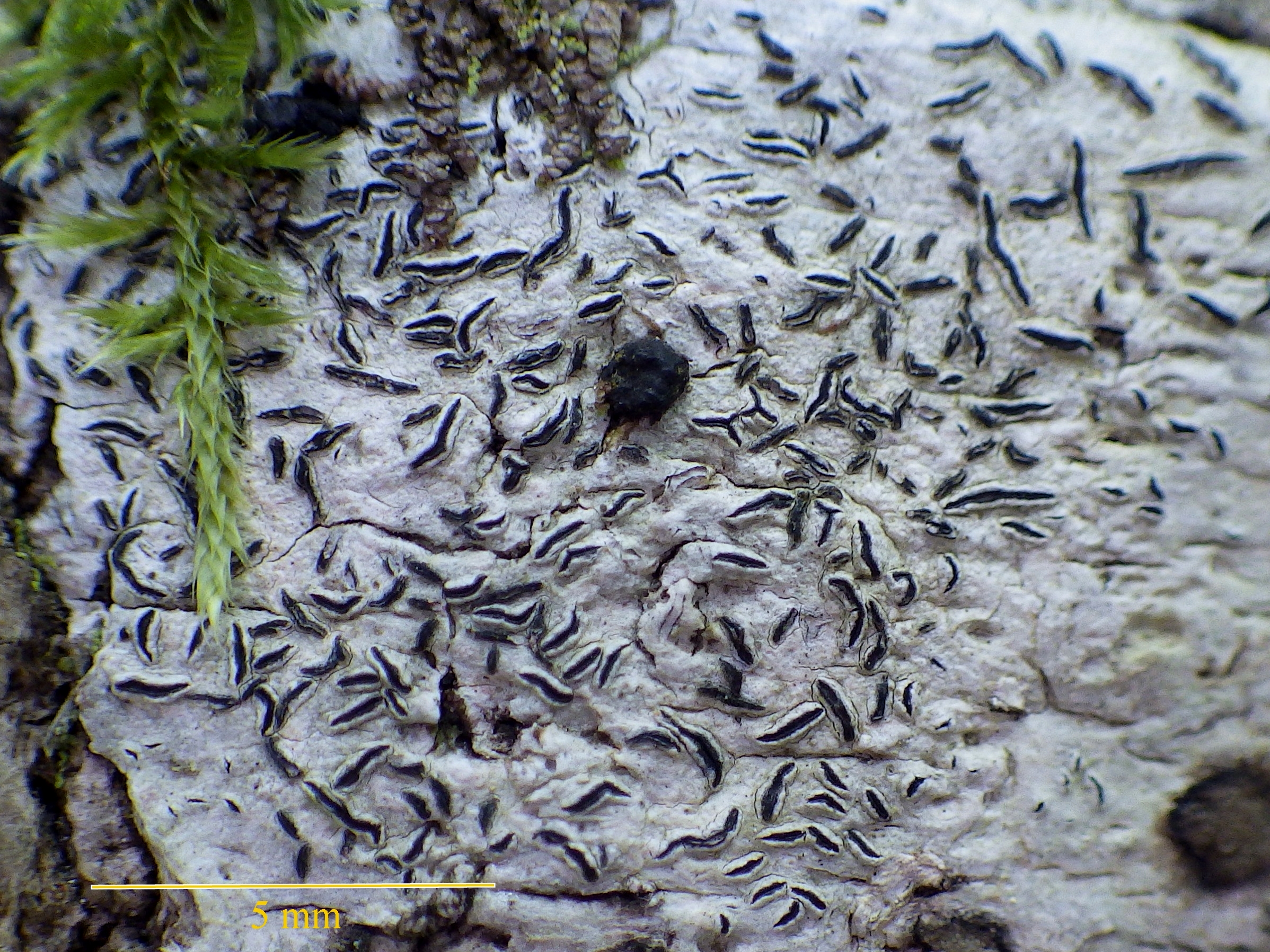
Graphis crebra

- Graphis caelata Fée (1874)
- Graphis caesiella Vain. (1890)
- Graphis caesiocarpa Redinger (1935)
- Graphis caesioglauca Redinger (1935)
- Graphis cambodiensis M.Nakan., Kashiw. & K.H.Moon (2010)
- Graphis capillacea Stirt. (1879)
- Graphis caribica Lücking (2011)
- Graphis carmenelisana B.Moncada, Motta & Lücking (2019)
- Graphis castanopsidis Zahlbr. (1930)
- Graphis catherinae A.W.Archer (2001)
- Graphis celtidis Müll.Arg. (1895)
- Graphis centrifuga Räsänen (1949)
- Graphis cervina Müll.Arg. (1892)
- Graphis cervinonigra Zahlbr. (1933)
- Graphis chlorocarpella Nyl. (1876)
- Graphis chlorotica A.Massal. ex Kremp. (1871)
- Graphis chondroplaca (Redinger) Lücking (2008)
- Graphis chromothecia R.C.Harris (1990)
- Graphis chungii Zahlbr. (1930)
- Graphis cinnamomea Adaw. & Makhija (2006)
- Graphis cincta (Pers.) Aptroot (2009)
- Graphis circumradians Nyl. (1868)
- Graphis clavata Fée (1874)
- Graphis coarctata Stirt. (1879)
- Graphis coenensis A.W.Archer (2007)
- Graphis colliculoides Adaw. & Makhija (2006)
- Graphis collinsiae Lücking & Lumbsch (2010)
- Graphis compressa Eschw. (1833)
- Graphis compulsa Kremp. (1876)
- Graphis conferta Zenker (1827)
- Graphis confinis C.Knight & Mitt. (1860)
- Graphis connectens Zahlbr. (1930)
- Graphis consociata (Makhija & Dube) Lücking & Kalb (2018)
- Graphis conturbata Kremp. (1876)
- Graphis cooperta Zenker (1827)
- Graphis coriacea Vain. (1915)
- Graphis corrugata Wallr. (1831)
- Graphis crassilabra Müll.Arg. (1882)
- Graphis crebra Vain. (1899)
- Graphis cremicolor (H.Magn.) Lücking & A.W.Archer (2009)
- Graphis crocea (Makhija & Adaw.) Lücking & Kalb (2018)
- Graphis crystallifera (Redinger) Staiger (2002)
- Graphis cupei Vain. ex Lücking (2009)
- Graphis curvula Ehrh. (1827)
- Graphis cycadicola A.W.Archer & Elix (2007)

== D ==
- Graphis darjeelingensis (Dharne & Roych.) Kr.P.Singh & Swarnal. (2008)
- Graphis decussata Kremp. (1876)
- Graphis deformis Fée (1874)
- Graphis deightonii C.W.Dodge (1953)
- Graphis delicatula Fée (1874)
- Graphis dendrogramma Nyl. (1877)
- Graphis dendroidea Leight. (1866)
- Graphis denudans Vain. (1926)
- Graphis descissa Müll.Arg. (1895)
- Graphis desquamescens (Fée) Zahlbr. (1909)
- Graphis detrita Zenker (1828)
- Graphis devestiens Nyl. (1891)
- Graphis diaphoroides Müll.Arg. (1886)
- Graphis dicarpoides M.Nakan. & H.Harada (1999)
- Graphis dichotoma (Müll.Arg.) Lücking (2008)
- Graphis discarpa A.W.Archer (2004)
- Graphis dispersa Makhija & Adaw. (2005)
- Graphis distans Fée (1825)
- Graphis distincta Makhija & Adaw. (2005)
- Graphis dracaenae Vain. (1901)
- Graphis dupaxana Vain. (1921)
- Graphis duplicata Ach. (1814)
- Graphis duplicatoinspersa Lücking (2008)

== E ==
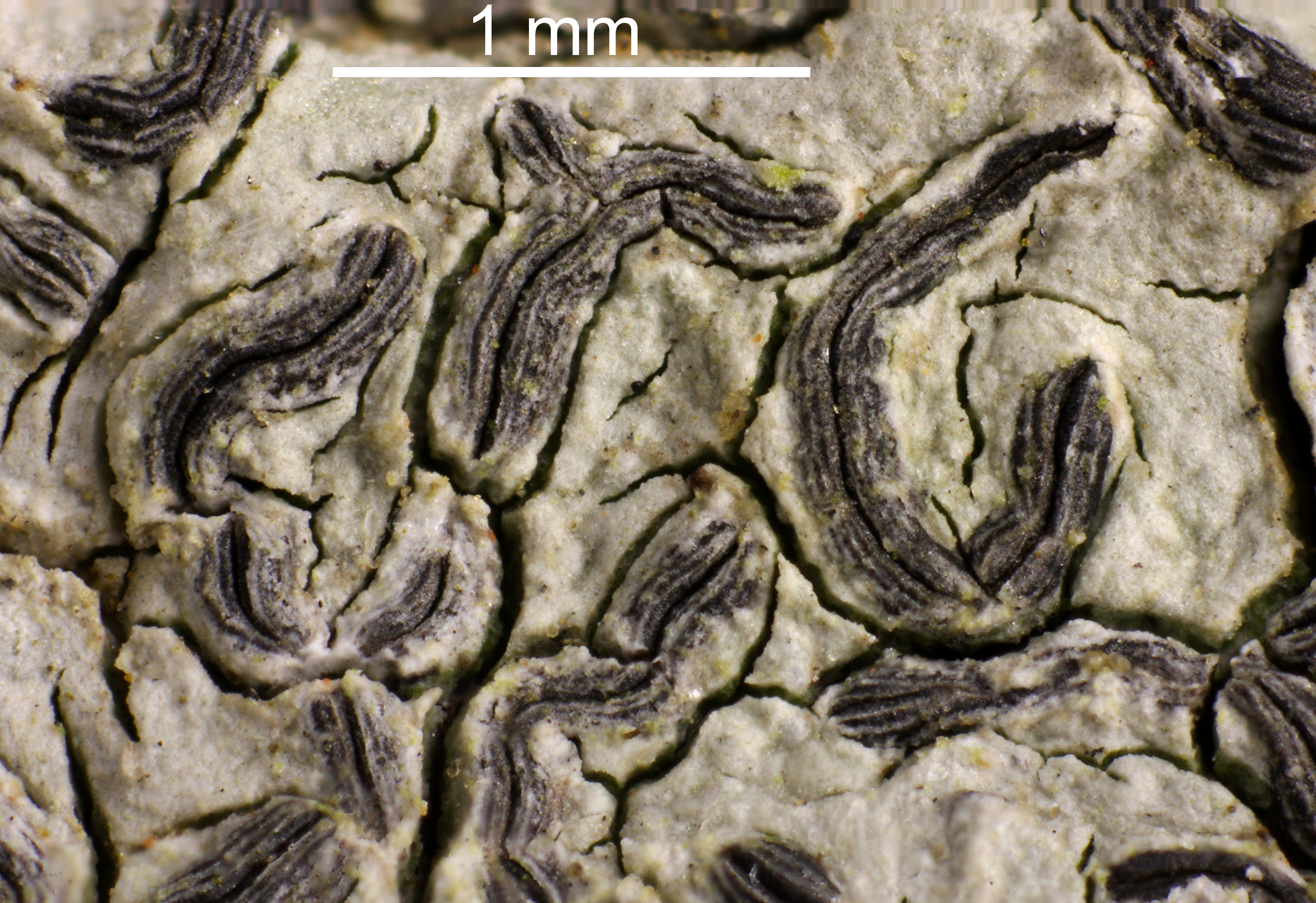
Graphis elegans

- Graphis eburnea Adaw. & Makhija (2007)
- Graphis eimeoensis A.W.Archer & Elix (2007)
- Graphis elegans (Borrer ex Sm.) Ach. (1814)
- Graphis elegantula Zahlbr. (1930)
- Graphis elevata Seavey & J.Seavey (2011)
- Graphis elongatoradians Fink ex V.Wirth & Hale (1978)
- Graphis emersa Müll.Arg. (1893)
- Graphis emersella J.Kalb, Lücking & Kalb (2018)
- Graphis endophaea Zahlbr. (1932)
- Graphis endoxantha Nyl. (1861)
- Graphis enteroleuca (Ach.) Stirt. (1877)
- Graphis epimelaena Müll.Arg. (1893)
- Graphis epiphloea Zahlbr. (1933)
- Graphis erythraea Kremp. (1914)
- Graphis erythrocardia Müll.Arg. (1894)
- Graphis eugeniae Vain. (1921)
- Graphis evirescens (Redinger) Lücking (2009)
- Graphis exalbata Nyl. (1889)

== F ==
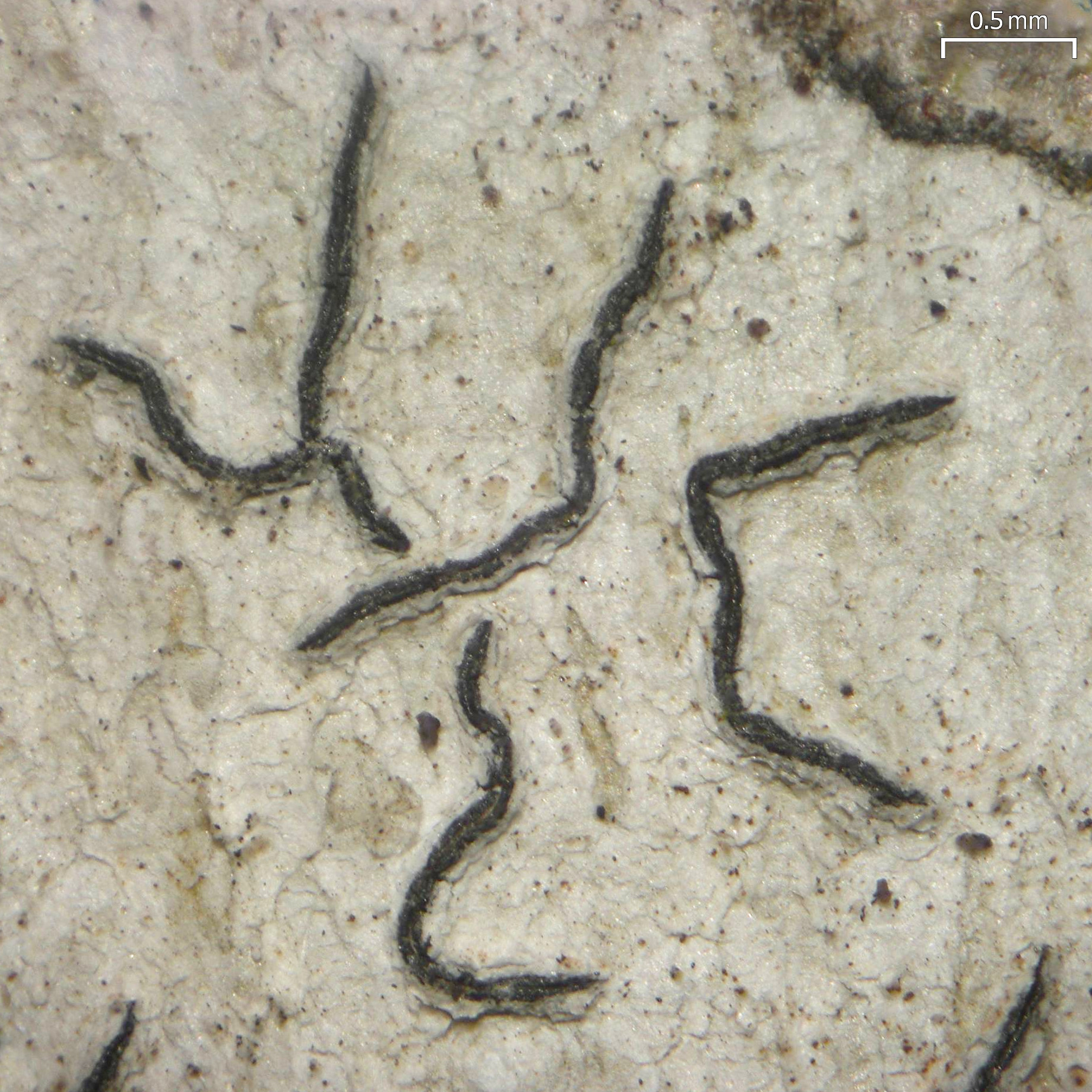
Graphis furcata

- Graphis fasciata (Eschw.) Lücking, M.Cáceres & Aptroot (2024)
- Graphis ferruginea Vain. (1921)
- Graphis ferrugineodisca Seavey & J.Seavey (2017)
- Graphis ficicola Vain. (1921)
- Graphis filiformis Adaw. & Makhija (2007)
- Graphis fissurata M.Nakan. & H.Harada (1999)
- Graphis fissurinoides van den Boom & Sipman (2013)
- Graphis flabellans Zahlbr. (1933)
- Graphis flavicans Müll.Arg. (1895)
- Graphis flavopalmicola Y.Joshi, Lücking & Hur (2010)
- Graphis flavovirens Makhija & Adaw. (2005)
- Graphis flexibilis Kremp. (1876)
- Graphis flexuosa Fée (1874)
- Graphis flindersiae Shirley (1889)
- Graphis flosculifera Weerakoon, Lücking & Aptroot (2019)
- Graphis foliicola Vain. (1901)
- Graphis formosana Zahlbr. (1933)
- Graphis fulminatrix Zenker (1829)
- Graphis fumosa Müll.Arg. (1891)
- Graphis furcata Fée (1825)

== G ==
- Graphis galactoderma (Zahlbr.) Lücking (2009)
- Graphis geraensis Redinger (1935)
- Graphis gibberosa Flot. (1829)
- Graphis glaucella Müll.Arg. (1887)
- Graphis glaucescens Fée (1825)
- Graphis glaucocaesia Müll.Arg. (1888)
- Graphis glaucocinerea Vain. (1907)
- Graphis glaucovirens Redinger (1935)
- Graphis gloriosensis A.W.Archer & Elix (2007)
- Graphis gomphospora Müll.Arg. (1895)
- Graphis gonimica Zahlbr. (1932)
- Graphis gracilenta Fée (1825)
- Graphis gracilis Nyl. (1858)
- Graphis graeffeana Kremp. (1874)
- Graphis grammitica Nyl. (1866)
- Graphis granulocarpa Redinger (1935)
- Graphis grossula Müll.Arg. (1886)
- Graphis guangdongensis Z.F.Jia & J.C.Wei (2009)
- Graphis guimarana Vain. (1921)
- Graphis guineensis C.W.Dodge (1953)

== H ==
- Graphis haemolobata Redinger (1935)
- Graphis haleana R.C.Harris (1990)
- Graphis halonata Kalb & Aptroot (2018)
- Graphis handelii Zahlbr. (1930)
- Graphis hatschbachii S.C.Feuerst. & Eliasaro (2014)
- Graphis heterocarpa Trevis. (1853)
- Graphis hinnulea Seavey & J.Seavey (2011)
- Graphis hochreutineri Redinger (1940)
- Graphis hodgesiana Lendemer (2010)
- Graphis homographiza Nyl. (1863)
- Graphis hongkongensis Wei Guo & Hur (2015)
- Graphis hunana Zahlbr. (1930)
- Graphis hunanensis (Zahlbr.) M.Nakan. & Kashiw. (2003)
- Graphis hyalinella Müll.Arg. (1894)
- Graphis hyphosa Staiger (2002)
- Graphis hypocrellina Lücking & Chaves (2008)

== I ==
- Graphis ignea Kremp. (1861)
- Graphis illota Müll.Arg. (1895)
- Graphis immersa Fink (1927)
- Graphis immersella Müll.Arg. (1895)
- Graphis immersicans A.W.Archer (2001)
- Graphis implexula Stirt. (1881)
- Graphis implicata Fée (1874)
- Graphis inaequalis Fée (1874)
- Graphis inamoena Zahlbr. (1928)
- Graphis increbrior Vain. (1930)
- Graphis indica J.Kalb & Kalb (2017)
- Graphis infida Nyl. (1895)
- Graphis inopinata S.C.Feuerst. & Eliasaro (2014)
- Graphis insculpta Wallr. (1825)
- Graphis inspersa Redinger (1935)
- Graphis inspersolongula Aptroot (2009)
- Graphis inspersonorstictica Aptroot, Lücking & M.Cáceres (2023)
- Graphis insulana (Müll.Arg.) Lücking & Sipman (2008)
- Graphis insularis Makhija & Adaw. (2005)
- Graphis intermediella Stirt. (1879)
- Graphis interversa Nyl. (1889)
- Graphis intexta Nyl. (1869)
- Graphis inustuloides Lücking (2012)
- Graphis inversa R.C.Harris (1990)
- Graphis isidiza Adaw. & Makhija (2004)

== J ==
- Graphis japonica (Müll.Arg.) A.W.Archer & Lücking (2009)
- Graphis jatrophae Müll.Arg. (1888)
- Graphis jeanmuelleri Lücking (2009)
- Graphis jejuensis K.H.Moon, M.Nakan. & Kashiw. (2012)
- Graphis jinhuana Kalb & Z.F.Jia (2014)

== K ==
- Graphis kakaduensis A.W.Archer (2001)
- Graphis karstenii Zahlbr. (1928)
- Graphis kavintuca Motta, B.Moncada & Lücking (2019)
- Graphis kelungana Zahlbr. (1933)
- Graphis kermesina Fée (1874)
- Graphis khaojoneana J.Kalb, Lücking & Kalb (2018)
- Graphis khaoyaiensis Poengs. & Lumbsch (2019)
- Graphis kjellbergii Redinger (1933)
- Graphis kollaimalaiensis Adaw. & Makhija (2006)
- Graphis koltermaniae Seavey & J.Seavey (2017)
- Graphis koratensis Pitakpong, Kraichak & Lücking (2015)
- Graphis koreana S.Joshi & Hur (2013)
- Graphis kousyuensis (Horik. & M.Nakan.) Lücking (2009)
- Graphis kurokawae M.Nakan., Kashiw. & K.H.Moon (2008)

== L ==
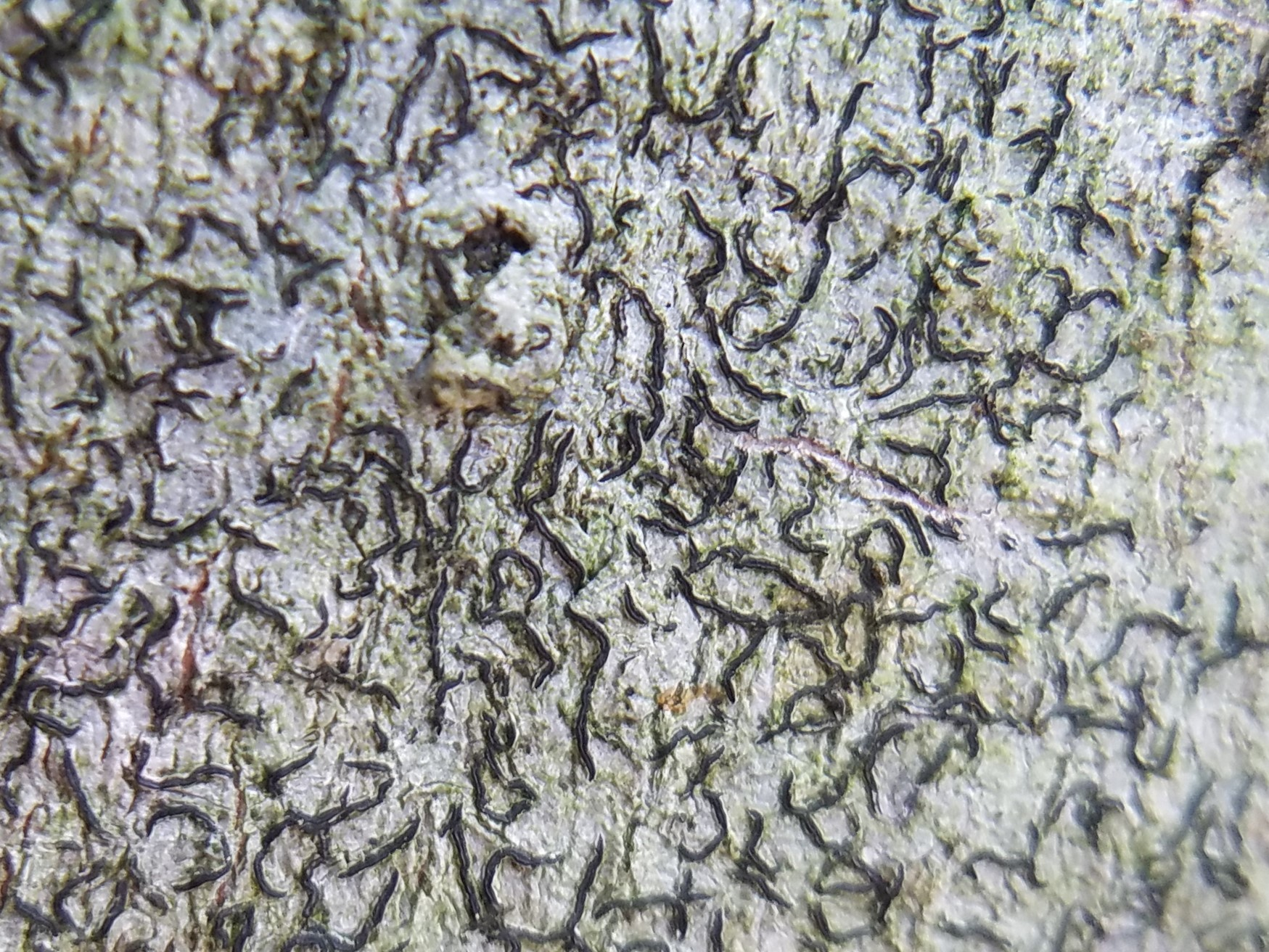
Graphis lineola

- Graphis laeviuscula Fée (1874)
- Graphis latibasa Zahlbr. (1933)
- Graphis lecanorina Müll.Arg. (1895)
- Graphis leioplaca Müll.Arg. (1880)
- Graphis leptaleocarpa A.W.Archer (2002)
- Graphis leptocarpa Fée (1825)
- Graphis leptocarpoides Makhija & Adaw. (2005)
- Graphis leptoclada Müll.Arg. (1882)
- Graphis leptotremoides Papong, Lücking & Kraichak (2014)
- Graphis librata C.Knight (1884)
- Graphis limae Vain. (1930)
- Graphis lindsayana Lücking & Diederich (2017)
- Graphis lineola Ach. (1810)
- Graphis litoralis Lücking, Sipman & Chaves (2008)
- Graphis longiramea Müll.Arg. (1892)
- Graphis lopingensis Zahlbr. (1930)
- Graphis lucifica R.C.Harris (1990)
- Graphis lueckingiana S.Joshi, Upreti & Hur (2018)
- Graphis lueckingii Dal-Forno & Eliasaro (2009)
- Graphis luluensis A.W.Archer (2004)
- Graphis lurizana Lücking, B.Moncada & Celis (2018)
- Graphis lussuensis Zahlbr. (1930)

== M ==
- Graphis macrocarpa G.Mey. (1825)
- Graphis macularis Spreng. (1827)
- Graphis maharashtrana Chitale, Makhija & B.O.Sharma (2011)
- Graphis makhijae R.Adhikari & Nayaka (2025) – India
- Graphis malacoderma Vain. (1921)
- Graphis manhaviensis Zahlbr. (1930)
- Graphis manipurensis Pushpi Singh & Kr.P.Singh (2014)
- Graphis maomingensis Meng Z.Yang & Lu L.Zhang (2018)
- Graphis marginifera Vain. (1921)
- Graphis maritima (A.W.Archer) A.W.Archer (2007)
- Graphis marusae A.B.Peña & Lücking (2011)
- Graphis medusula (Pers.) Kremp. (1876)
- Graphis meghalayensis Adaw. & Makhija (2007)
- Graphis mellis-insulae S.C.Feuerst. & Eliasaro (2014)
- Graphis microsperma (Chitale, Makhija & B.O.Sharma) Lücking & Kalb (2018)
- Graphis mikuraensis Y.Ohmura & M.Nakan. (2016)
- Graphis mindanaoensis Vain. (1921)
- Graphis mocimboensis Vain. (1930)
- Graphis modesta Zahlbr. (1911)
- Graphis mokanarum Lücking, B.Moncada & M.C.Martínez (2019)
- Graphis moriensis R.Adhikari & Nayaka (2025) – India
- Graphis moultonii Vain. (1921)
- Graphis multibrachiata Zahlbr. (1930)
- Graphis murali-elegans Sipman (2014)
- Graphis muscicola (Kalb) Staiger (2002)
- Graphis myriocarpa Trevis. (1853)
- Graphis myriocarpiza Vain. (1930)
- Graphis myriocarpoides Vain. (1930)
- Graphis myrtacea (Müll.Arg.) Lücking (2008)

== N ==
- Graphis neeladriensis Mohabe, Bodicherla, Nayaka & A.M.Reddy (2016)
- Graphis neglecta Erichsen (1930)
- Graphis negrosina (Vain.) Lücking (2009)
- Graphis nematodes Stirt. (1874)
- Graphis nematodiza Vain. (1921)
- Graphis neoelongata Lücking (2009)
- Graphis neoraensis Jagad.Ram & G.P.Sinha (2009)
- Graphis nerurensis Makhija, A.Dube, Adaw. & Chitale (2006)
- Graphis nigeriensis C.W.Dodge (1953)
- Graphis nigririmis (Nyl.) Müll.Arg. (1895)
- Graphis nigrocarpa Adaw. & Makhija (2006)
- Graphis nigroglobosa Sipman (2014)
- Graphis nilgiriensis Adaw. & Makhija (2006)
- Graphis norfolkensis A.W.Archer & Elix (2019)
- Graphis norsorediata Aptroot (2020)
- Graphis norstictica A.W.Archer & Lücking (2009)
- Graphis noumeana Müll.Arg. (1887)
- Graphis nudanorsticta Z.F.Jia & Q.D.Wang (2018)

== O ==
- Graphis obtusior Nyl. (1859)
- Graphis ocellata Zahlbr. (1933)
- Graphis oligospora Zahlbr. (1930)
- Graphis omiana J.Kalb, Lücking & Kalb (2018)
- Graphis ondensis C.W.Dodge (1953)
- Graphis overeemii Zahlbr. (1928)
- Graphis oxyclada Müll.Arg. (1885)

== P ==
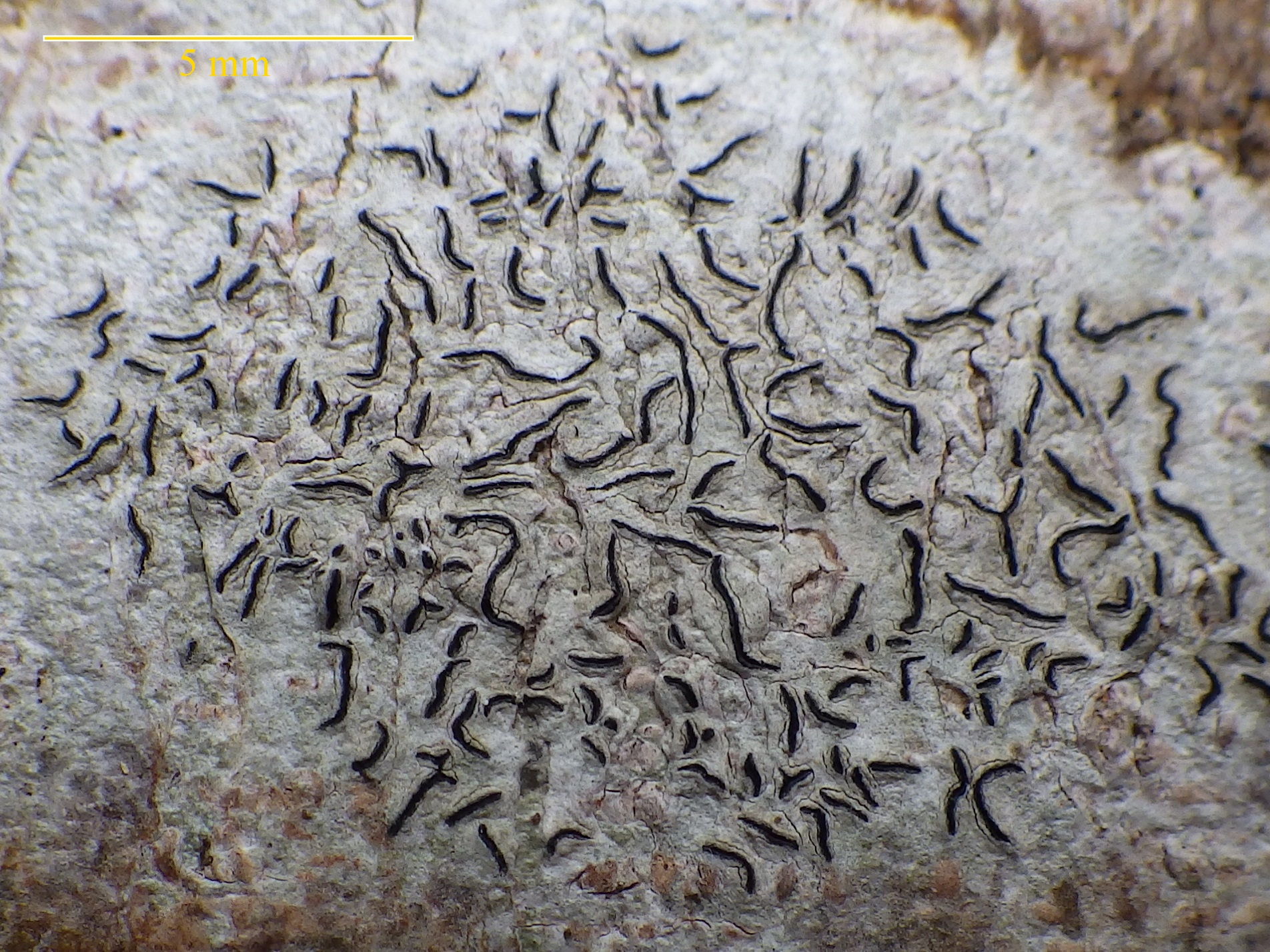
Graphis plumierae

- Graphis pachysporella Müll.Arg. (1893)
- Graphis pallescens Vain. (1930)
- Graphis palmensis Vain. (1930)
- Graphis palmicola Makhija & Adaw. (2005)
- Graphis palmyrensis Zahlbr. (1916)
- Graphis pananensis Kalb & Z.F.Jia (2014)
- Graphis pandanicola M.Nakan. & H.Harada (1999)
- Graphis panhalensis (Patw. & C.R.Kulk.) Chitale, Makhija & B.O.Sharma (2011)
- Graphis papillifera Lücking, N.Marín & B.Moncada (2023)
- Graphis paradisserpens Sipman & Lücking (2008)
- Graphis paradoxa Fée (1874)
- Graphis paradussii Z.F.Jia (2011)
- Graphis paralleloides M.Cáceres & Lücking (2009)
- Graphis paranaensis Dal-Forno & Eliasaro (2009)
- Graphis paraschiffneri Lücking & Breuss (2015)
- Graphis paraserpens Lizano & Lücking (2008)
- Graphis pedata Fr. (1820)
- Graphis pernambucoradians M.Cáceres & Lücking (2007)
- Graphis persicina Meyen & Flot. (1843)
- Graphis persoonii P.M.Kirk & L.Arcadia (2023)
- Graphis persulcata Stirt. (1879)
- Graphis pertricosa (Kremp.) A.W.Archer (2005)
- Graphis pinicola Zahlbr. (1930)
- Graphis planetocarpa Leight. (1866)
- Graphis platycarpella Müll.Arg. (1891)
- Graphis plumbeidisca M.Nakan., Kashiw. & K.H.Moon (2014)
- Graphis plumierae Vain. (1915)
- Graphis polystriatosubmuriformis Aptroot, Lücking & M.Cáceres (2023)
- Graphis propinqua Müll.Arg. (1882)
- Graphis prunicola Vain. (1921)
- Graphis pseudoglyphis Lücking, N.Marín & B.Moncada (2023)
- Graphis psidii Groenh. (1954)
- Graphis puiggarii (Müll.Arg.) Lücking (2008)
- Graphis pulicaris Wallr. (1831)
- Graphis pustulata Wallr. (1831)
- Graphis pustulosa M.Cáceres, Aptroot & Lücking (2014)

== R ==
- Graphis radians Fée (1874)
- Graphis radiatoflexuosa Zenker (1828)
- Graphis rajapakshana Weerakoon, Lücking & Aptroot (2019)
- Graphis ramosa Nyl. (1891)
- Graphis redingeriana Lücking & Aptroot (2025)
- Graphis rigidula Müll.Arg. (1891)
- Graphis rimosothallina Weerakoon, Lücking & Aptroot (2019)
- Graphis riopiedrensis (Fink) Lücking (2009)
- Graphis robertusii A.B.Peña, Herrera-Camp. & R.Miranda (2015)
- Graphis rockii Redinger (1934)
- Graphis rondoniana M.Cáceres, Aptroot & Lücking (2014)
- Graphis rongklaensis Sutjar. (2012)
- Graphis rosae-emiliae A.B.Peña & Lücking (2014)
- Graphis rosalbinana B.Moncada, Amórtegui & Lücking (2019)
- Graphis roseotincta Vain. (1901)
- Graphis rubricosa Fée (1874)

== S ==
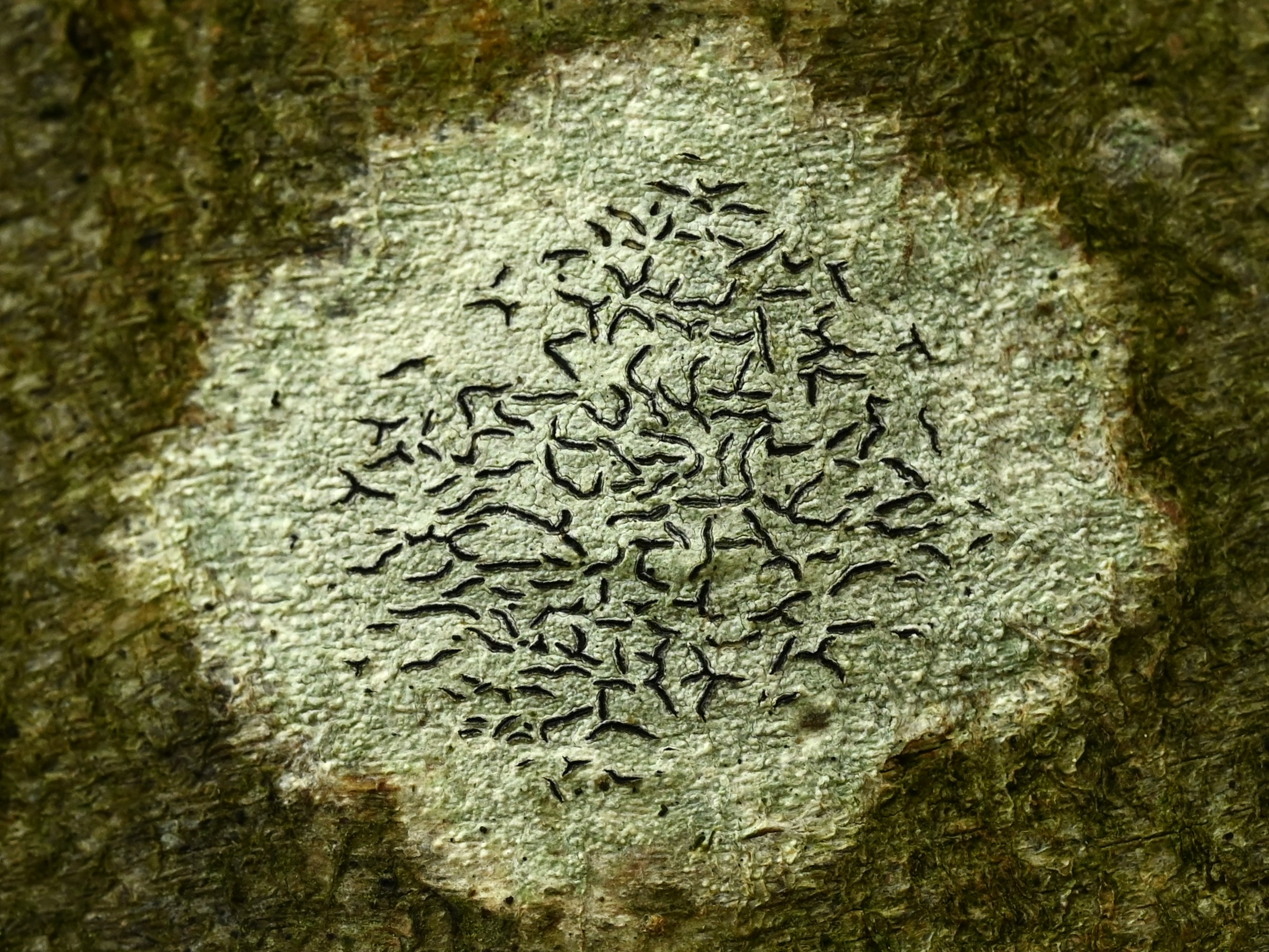
Graphis scripta

- Graphis saipanensis M.Nakan. & H.Harada (1999)
- Graphis salacinilongiramea Adaw. & Makhija (2007)
- Graphis sandalon Meyen & Flot. (1843)
- Graphis santanderiana Motta, B.Moncada & Lücking (2019)
- Graphis sapii Zahlbr. (1930)
- Graphis saxicola (Müll.Arg.) A.W.Archer (2005)
- Graphis saxiseda Zahlbr. (1926)
- Graphis schiffneri Zahlbr. (1928)
- Graphis schizogramma Vain. (1921)
- Graphis schizograpta Müll.Arg. (1882)
- Graphis schroederi Zahlbr. (1921)
- Graphis schummiana J.Kalb, Lücking & Kalb (2018)
- Graphis scripta (L.) Ach. (1809)
- Graphis seawardii Flakus & Kukwa (2013)
- Graphis semiaperta Müll.Arg. (1891)
- Graphis separanda Nyl. (1863)
- Graphis setschwanensis Zahlbr. (1930)
- Graphis singaporina Nyl. (1891)
- Graphis sirohiensis Pushpi Singh & Kr.P.Singh (2014)
- Graphis sitapurensis Makhija & Adaw. (2005)
- Graphis slendrae Hale ex Lücking (2009)
- Graphis solmariana Motta, B.Moncada & Lücking (2019)
- Graphis sororcula Müll.Arg. (1893)
- Graphis sphalera Nyl. (1864)
- Graphis spodoplaca Zahlbr. (1932)
- Graphis srilankensis Weerakoon, Wijey. & Lumbsch (2012)
- Graphis stellata M.Cáceres & Lücking (2007)
- Graphis stenograpta Müll.Arg. (1880)
- Graphis stenospora Müll.Arg. (1882)
- Graphis stenotera Vain. (1921)
- Graphis stipitata A.W.Archer (2001)
- Graphis streimannii A.W.Archer (2001)
- Graphis striata Fée (1874)
- Graphis subalbostriata Lücking (2009)
- Graphis subaltamirensis Passos, M.Cáceres & Lücking (2018)
- Graphis subangustata Vain. (1921)
- Graphis subcabbalistica Vain. (1890)
- Graphis subcontorta (Müll.Arg.) Lücking & Chaves (2008)
- Graphis subcupei S.C.Feuerst. & Eliasaro (2014)
- Graphis subcurva Zenker (1827)
- Graphis subelegans Nyl. (1891)
- Graphis subelongata Papong, Lücking & Kraichak (2014)
- Graphis subfiliformis E.L.Lima & Lücking (2019)
- Graphis subhiascens (Müll.Arg.) Lücking (2008)
- Graphis subinsulana Poengs. & Kalb (2014)
- Graphis subintegra Redinger (1933)
- Graphis subintermedians Hale ex Lücking (2009)
- Graphis subintricans Vain. (1930)
- Graphis sublitoralis J.Kalb, Lücking & Kalb (2018)
- Graphis submarginata Lücking (2008)
- Graphis subolivacea Zahlbr. (1926)
- Graphis subparilis Nyl. (1889)
- Graphis subpulicaris Zahlbr. (1933)
- Graphis subregularis A.W.Archer (2001)
- Graphis subrufula Müll.Arg. (1894)
- Graphis subserpentina Nyl. (1863)
- Graphis subtecta (Nyl.) Lücking (2009)
- Graphis subtenella Müll.Arg. (1887)
- Graphis subtracta Nyl. (1863)
- Graphis subvittata Adaw. & Makhija (2007)
- Graphis sulphurella (Zahlbr.) Lücking (2009)
- Graphis sundarbanensis Jagad.Ram & G.P.Sinha (2007)
- Graphis supernata Vain. (1921)
- Graphis supracola A.W.Archer (2001)
- Graphis suzanae Koch & S.C.Feuerst. (2016)
- Graphis syzygii Aptroot (2009)

== T ==
- Graphis taneina M.Nakan., Kashiw. & K.H.Moon (2011)
- Graphis tapetica Zahlbr. (1912)
- Graphis tenella Ach. (1814)
- Graphis tenellula Vain. (1915)
- Graphis tenoriensis Chaves & Lücking (2008)
- Graphis tenuescens Nyl. (1876)
- Graphis tenuirima (Shirley) A.W.Archer (2005)
- Graphis tenuis Vain. (1921)
- Graphis tenuissima Fée (1874)
- Graphis tetracarbonisata L.I.Ferraro, Lücking, Aptroot & M.Cáceres (2014)
- Graphis tetralocularis C.Bock & M.Hauck (2005)
- Graphis theae Zahlbr. (1930)
- Graphis thoroldii C.W.Dodge (1953)
- Graphis thunsinhalayensis Weerakoon, Arachchige & Lücking (2019)
- Graphis timidula Nyl. (1886)
- Graphis tonglonensis Vain. (1921)
- Graphis tonkinensis Müll.Arg. (1891)
- Graphis treubii Zahlbr. (1928)
- Graphis tricolor Aptroot & S.C.Feuerst. (2020)
- Graphis triquetra Eschw. (1833)
- Graphis triseptata van den Boom & Sipman (2018)
- Graphis triticeella Vain. (1930)
- Graphis tsunodae Zahlbr. (1916)
- Graphis tumida Kremp. (1875)
- Graphis tumidulella Fink (1927)
- Graphis turgidula Müll.Arg. (1895)

== U ==
- Graphis umbrina Nyl. (1891)
- Graphis urandrae Vain. (1921)

== V ==
- Graphis valparaiensis Adaw. & Makhija (2007)
- Graphis venosa Eschw. (1824)
- Graphis venusta Fée (1874)
- Graphis vermifera Müll.Arg. (1887)
- Graphis verrucariiformis Fée (1874)
- Graphis verrucata Z.F.Jia & Kalb (2014)
- Graphis verruciformis Adaw. & Makhija (2006)
- Graphis verrucoserpens Lücking (2019)
- Graphis vinosa Müll.Arg. (1895)
- Graphis virens Müll.Arg. (1895)
- Graphis virescens Müll.Arg. (1880)
- Graphis viridithallina Aptroot, Lücking & M.Cáceres (2023)
- Graphis vittata Müll.Arg. (1882)
- Graphis vulvulescens Fée (1874)

== X ==
- Graphis xylophaga (R.C.Harris) Lendemer (2008)

== Y ==
- Graphis yaucoensis Fink (1927)
- Graphis yunnanensis S.Joshi, Upreti & Hur (2015)

== Z ==
- Graphis zollingeri Zahlbr. (1928)
- Graphis zonatula Zahlbr. (1930)

== See also ==
- List of Allographa species
