= Graphis palmicola =

Scientific classification
- Kingdom: Fungi
- Division: Ascomycota
- Class: Lecanoromycetes
- Order: Graphidales
- Family: Graphidaceae
- Genus: Graphis
- Species: G. palmicola

Binomial name
- Graphis palmicola Makhija & Adaw. (2005)

Species of lichen-forming fungus

Graphis palmicola is a species of script lichen in the family Graphidaceae. Found on the Nicobar Islands, it was formally described as a new species in 2005 by Urmila Makhija and Bharati Adawadkar. The type specimen was collected from a beach forest in Katchal Island, where it was found growing on a coconut tree. The species epithet, which combines the Latin Palma ("palm tree") and cola ("exists"), refers to its host. The ascomata (fruiting bodies) of the lichen are in the form of lirellae, which are elongated and irregularly branched; this particular branching pattern is known as the handelii-morph.

== See also ==
- List of Graphis (lichen) species
