= Graphis inspersolongula =

Scientific classification
- Kingdom: Fungi
- Division: Ascomycota
- Class: Lecanoromycetes
- Order: Graphidales
- Family: Graphidaceae
- Genus: Graphis
- Species: G. inspersolongula

Binomial name
- Graphis inspersolongula Aptroot (2009)

Species of lichen-forming fungus

Graphis inspersolongula is a species of script lichen in the family Graphidaceae. It was described as new to science in 1995 from material collected in Papua New Guinea. The species is distinguished from similar members of its genus by a combination of microscopic features and its chemical composition.

== Taxonomy ==
The species was formally described by André Aptroot in 1995. The holotype specimen was collected in the Owen Stanley Range, Central Province, Papua New Guinea, at the edge of primary montane forest at an elevation of 2,100 m. The specific epithet inspersolongula refers to its similarity to Graphis longula but with a hymenium that is "inspersa" (densely filled with minute granules) and other distinctive traits. It differs from G. longula in having an inspersed hymenium, the presence of the lichen secondary compound norstictic acid, and shorter fruiting bodies (lirellae).

== Description ==
The thallus of G. inspersolongulais corticate (having a distinct outer cortex layer) and is smooth to uneven in texture, with a pale grey colour. The fruiting bodies are lirellae, elongated slit-like structures characteristic of many Graphis species, which in this species are erumpent (breaking through the surface), lack a thalline margin (rim of thallus tissue surrounding the lirella), are short and sparsely branched, and measure 1–3 mm long by 0.4–0.7 mm wide. The edges (labia) of the lirellae are striate, showing fine parallel lines.

Internally, the excipulum (layer surrounding the spore-producing tissue) is completely carbonised (blackened). The hymenium (the spore-bearing layer) is inspersed, meaning it contains numerous minute oil droplets or granules, here of "type A" form. Each ascus produces eight spores. These ascospores are hyaline (translucent), have 13–19 internal cross-walls (septa), and measure 75–100 × 15–20 μm.

Chemically, the species produces norstictic acid, a secondary metabolite detectable with chemical spot tests or thin-layer chromatography.

== Habitat and distribution ==
Graphis inspersolongula is known from its type locality in the Owen Stanley Range of Papua New Guinea, where it grows on tree trunks at the edge of primary montane forest. The type collection was made at an elevation of 2,100 m.

== See also ==
- List of Graphis (lichen) species
