= Graphis halonata =

Scientific classification
- Kingdom: Fungi
- Division: Ascomycota
- Class: Lecanoromycetes
- Order: Graphidales
- Family: Graphidaceae
- Genus: Graphis
- Species: G. halonata

Binomial name
- Graphis halonata Kalb & Aptroot (2018)

Species of lichen-forming fungus

Graphis halonata is a species of lichen in the family Graphidaceae, first described in 2018. It is found in Brazil. The species is distinguished by its saxicolous (rock-dwelling) habitat, presence of norstictic acid, and unique ascospore characteristics.

== Taxonomy ==
Graphis halonata was formally described by the lichenologists Klaus Kalb and André Aptroot in 2018. The type specimen was collected in the Serra do Espinhaco, specifically Serra do Caraça, Bocaina, Minas Gerais, Brazil, on a sandstone boulder at an altitude of 1,450 m (4,760 ft). The specific epithet halonata refers to the characteristic halonate (halo-like) ascospores found in this species.

== Description ==
The thallus of Graphis halonata is saxicolous, crustose, discontinuous and uneven. It lacks a cortex, is dull and ochraceous white, measuring up to 0.2 mm thick, and is not surrounded by a prothallus. The photobiont is trentepohlioid. Ascomata are erumpent from the thallus, completely carbonized, not striate, wavy linear, irregularly branched and partly divided into separate discs, measuring 0.5–2.5 mm long, about 0.4 mm wide, and approximately 0.3 mm high. The rim is black, and the thalline margin is lateral and ochraceous white. The hamathecium is 100–125 μm high and not inspersed. Ascospores, which number eight per ascus, are hyaline, IKI+ (violet), and broadly ellipsoid in shape. These spores are muriform (i.e., divided into lumina or locules by intersecting 3–5 longitudinal and 0–3 transverse septa), measuring 18–26 by 12–15 μm, surrounded by a gelatinous sheath about 5 μm wide, with lumina arranged somewhat spirally. Pycnidia were not observed.

Chemical spot tests show that the thallus and thalline margin of the apothecia are UV−, C−, P−, and K+ (yellow turning red). Thin-layer chromatography analysis shows the presence of norstictic and connorstictic acids.

== Habitat and distribution ==
Graphis halonata was found on a free-standing sandstone boulder and at the time of original publication was known only from Brazil.

== See also ==
- List of Graphis (lichen) species
