= Graphis stipitata =

Scientific classification
- Kingdom: Fungi
- Division: Ascomycota
- Class: Lecanoromycetes
- Order: Graphidales
- Family: Graphidaceae
- Genus: Graphis
- Species: G. stipitata

Binomial name
- Graphis stipitata A.W.Archer (2001)

Species of lichen-forming fungus

Graphis stipitata is a species of corticolous (bark-dwelling) script lichen in the family Graphidaceae. Found in Australia, it was formally described as a new species in 2001 by the lichenologist Alan W. Archer. The type specimen was collected near Yungaburra Road in Queensland (about 2 km southeast of Atherton) at an elevation of 850 m (2,790 ft), where it was found growing on the bark of Casuarina. The species epithet stipitata ('crowded') alludes to the numerous and crowded lirellae (fruiting bodies) that are characteristic of this species. The lichen contains three secondary metabolites (lichen products): lichexanthone as a major metabolite, norstictic acid as a minor component, and trace amounts of connorstictic acid.

== See also ==
- List of Graphis (lichen) species
