= Graphis neeladriensis =

Scientific classification
- Kingdom: Fungi
- Division: Ascomycota
- Class: Lecanoromycetes
- Order: Graphidales
- Family: Graphidaceae
- Genus: Graphis
- Species: G. neeladriensis

Binomial name
- Graphis neeladriensis Mohabe, Bodicherla, Nayaka & A.M.Reddy (2016)

Species of lichen-forming fungus

Graphis neeladriensis is a species of lichen in the family Graphidaceae. Found in the Eastern Ghats mountain range of India and was formally described in 2016. The species epithet neeladriensis refers to the Neeladri range where the type specimen was discovered.

== Description ==
Graphis neeladriensis forms a thin, crusty (crustose) growth on tree bark, appearing greenish-grey to grey in colour with a smooth to cracked, shiny surface. Like all lichens, it is a symbiotic organism consisting of a fungus and an alga living together in a structured thallus (body), which in this case is 80–160 micrometres thick.

The lichen's most distinctive features are its reproductive structures called lirellae – elongated, black, line-like features that contain the fungal spores. In G. neeladriensis, these lirellae are partially sunken into the thallus surface and can be either short or long (0.2–3.5 millimetres), simple or occasionally branched. The lirellae have 2–4 parallel grooves (striae) on their upper surface.

The spores are produced in specialised cells called asci, with each ascus containing eight spores. The spores are colourless and divided by both horizontal and vertical walls (septa), with 4–12 horizontal divisions and 1–3 vertical divisions at the ends, measuring 24–77 by 7–12 micrometres.

When exposed to ultraviolet light, G. neeladriensis glows yellow due to the presence of a chemical compound called lichexanthone. This is a relatively rare characteristic among Graphis species, with only six known species containing this compound.

== Habitat and distribution ==
The species has only been found in the Neeladri range of Tirumala hills in Andhra Pradesh, India, where it grows on the bark of jackfruit trees (Artocarpus heterophyllus) at an elevation of around 650 metres. It shares its habitat with other lichens including species of Bacidia, other Graphis species, Lecanora achroa, and Hyperphyscia adglutinata.

== See also ==
- List of Graphis (lichen) species
