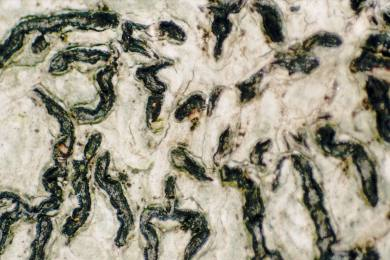
- Graphis scripta (lirellae)

Conservation status
- Secure (NatureServe)

Scientific classification
- Kingdom: Fungi
- Division: Ascomycota
- Class: Lecanoromycetes
- Order: Graphidales
- Family: Graphidaceae
- Genus: Graphis
- Species: G. scripta

Binomial name
- Graphis scripta (L.) Ach. (1809)

Synonyms
- Lichen scriptus L. (1753)

= Graphis scripta =

Species of lichen-forming fungus

Graphis scripta is a crustose lichen in the family Graphidaceae. It is commonly called script lichen, secret writing lichen, or similar names, because its growth pattern makes it look like writing. Stigmidium microspilum and Arthonia graphidicola are associated lichenicolous fungi. It is variable with either curved or stellate apothecia. The margins are carbonaceous and raised, without furrows. Mature ascospores are without colour, but become brown with age.

== Taxonomy ==
The lichen was formally described by Carl Linnaeus in 1753 as Lichen scriptus. Erik Acharius later transferred the epithet to the genus Graphis. In Acharius's treatment, the name was placed in synonymy with 30 other available names, and in 1923 Alexander Zahlbruckner adopted an even broader circumscription, listing over 100 synonyms under Graphis scripta. Graphis is a predominantly tropical genus, and G. scripta is its type species and among the best-known members of the group. Graphis is by far the largest genus in the family Graphidaceae; a world-wide key recognised 330 accepted species and listed a further 205 epithets as synonyms.

In that treatment, the authors noted that the extratropical G. scripta complex remained unresolved, and suggested that G. scripta may represent a collective taxon. Although some floras have generally treated it as a single, stable species, it shows substantial morphological variation, and more than 100 forms and varieties have been described within it. Because the complex lacks distinctive secondary chemistry and has few measurable characters, attempts to divide it have mainly relied on apothecium and ascospore morphology.

On the basis of apothecium features, Gerhard Neuwirth and André Aptroot recognised four species within the complex in Europe: G. scripta (apothecia remaining closed), G. macrocarpa (open, brownish discs), G. pulverulenta (open, white-pruinose discs), and G. betulina (with a conspicuous, thick thalline margin). They reported that these taxa can occur together and may even grow on the same tree, supporting the interpretation that at least some of the distinguishing characters are genetically fixed rather than simple substrate-driven variation. However, a later molecular study sampling four genetic markers found six to seven distinct lineages within the G. scripta complex, and these did not correspond to the morphospecies recognised from apothecium morphology. The authors therefore concluded that a formal taxonomic revision will require broader sampling and the evaluation of additional characters that can diagnose the genetically distinct clades. Because no original Linnaean specimen is known to survive, the application of the name has been tied to a published illustration (lectotype) and stabilised with a later Swedish specimen (epitype).

== Description ==
The thallus (the main lichen body) is smooth or only slightly uneven, and is usually whitish green to green-grey, sometimes with a yellowish tinge. The apothecia (spore-producing structures) are typically elongate and script-like, either unbranched or branched, measuring about 5–25 mm long and 1–2 mm wide. Their outer rim (the true exciple) is black and not furrowed, while the disc is narrow and breaks through the surface to become exposed even in dry conditions; it is often dusted with a faint whitish pruina. In most species of Graphis, the disc is concealed when dry, but a small number of species – including G. scripta and close relatives – can have the disc exposed even in dry conditions. Within the genus, a thin whitish pruina on the labia or disc is generally treated as a species-level character.

The ascospores are 25–70 × 6–10 μm, spindle- to cylinder-shaped, and divided by 5–15 cross-walls (septa). Pycnidia are rare; when present, they produce very small conidia about 2–5 × about 1 μm. No lichen substances have been detected in this species using thin-layer chromatography.

== Journal ==
A journal of lichenology is named Graphis Scripta after the lichen. The generic name Graphis is New Latin for "writing", from Greek γραφής, a pen or stylus, from γρᾰ́φειν graphein, "to write". The specific name scripta is Latin for "written", from scribo, "I write". The "suitable name ... for a journal which concentrated on publishing new lichen records" was chosen by the lichenologist Vagn Alstrup.

== See also ==
- List of Graphis (lichen) species
- List of lichens named by Carl Linnaeus
