= Script lichen =

Group of lichens

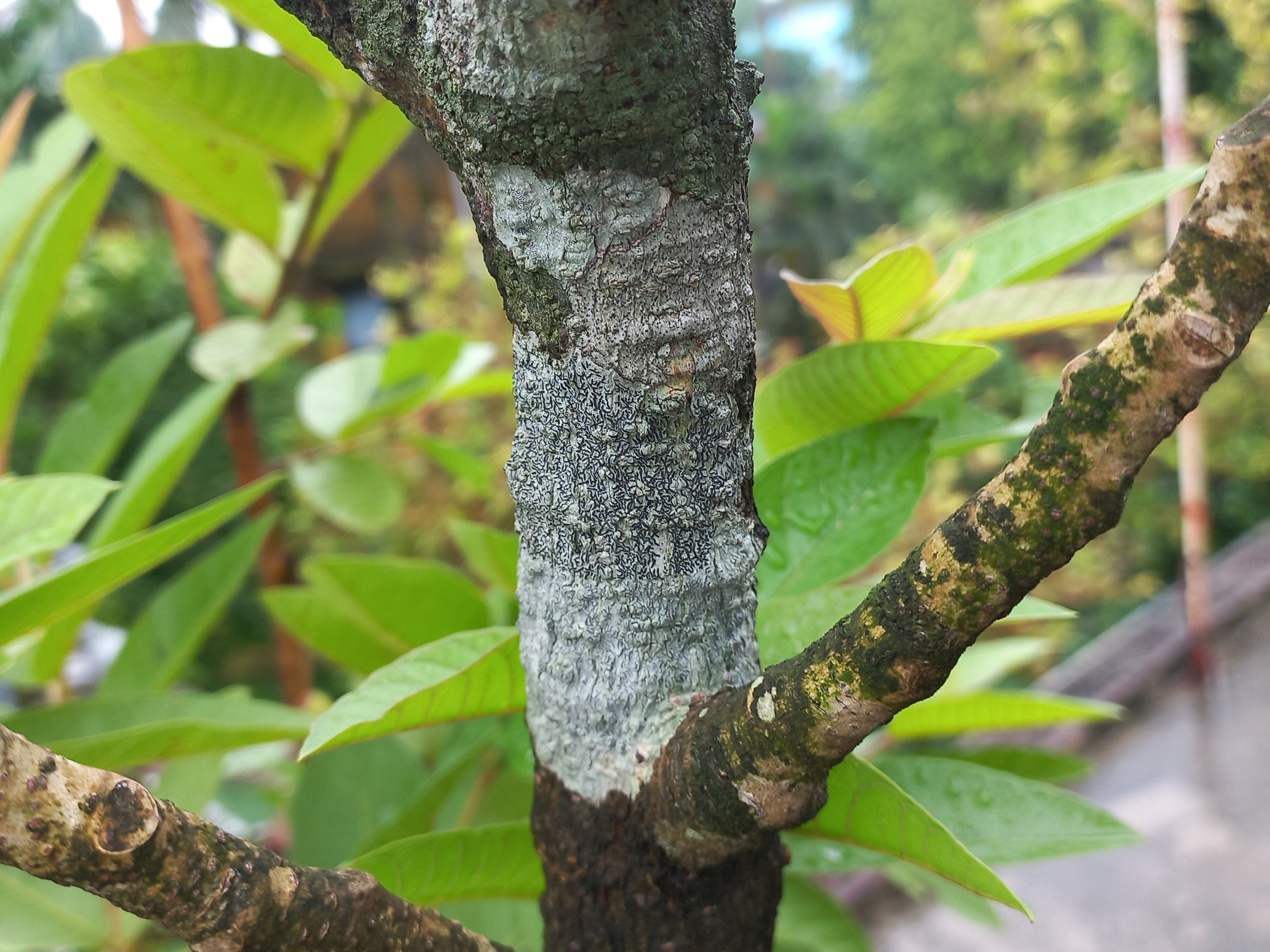
Script lichen

A script lichen, or graphid lichen, is a member of a group of lichens which have spore producing structures that look like writing on the lichen body. The structures are elongated and narrow apothecia called lirellae, which look like short scribbles on the thallus. "Graphid" is derived from Greek for "writing". An example is Halegrapha mucronata.
