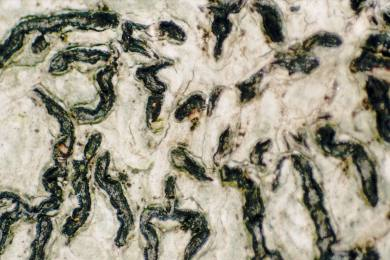
- Graphis scripta (lirellae)

Scientific classification
- Kingdom: Fungi
- Division: Ascomycota
- Class: Lecanoromycetes
- Order: Graphidales
- Family: Graphidaceae
- Genus: Graphis; Adans. (1763)

Type species
- Graphis scripta (L.) Ach. (1809)

Species
- List of Graphis (lichen) species

Synonyms
- Oxystoma Eschw. (1824); Fissurina Fée (1825); Aulacographa Leight. (1854); Diplolabia A.Massal. (1854); Dyplolabia A.Massal. (1854); Diplographis Kremp. ex A.Massal. (1860); Anomomorpha Nyl. ex Hue (1891); Digraphis Clem. (1909); Graphidomyces E.A.Thomas ex Cif. & Tomas. (1953)

= Graphis (lichen) =

Genus of lichen-forming fungi

Graphis is a genus of lichen-forming fungi in the family Graphidaceae. Historically, Graphis was used as a broad category for species with colourless, transversely septate ascospores within the Graphidaceae. However, with advances in genetic research, this classification has become more refined. As a result, species previously classified under Graphina have been re-assigned to Allographa or Graphis. The species complex around Graphis scripta has also been recognised, leading to the identification of several new species, many of which may have been previously overlooked.

== Taxonomy ==
The genus Graphis was introduced by the French naturalist Michel Adanson in 1763, in a brief protologue that framed these lichens in simple, field-visible terms. He characterised Graphis as a thin, creeping, powdery crust (farinose) spreading like a film and marked by furrows that could be simple or branched, sometimes with the margins raised into low ridges; he also recorded small spherical bodies occupying the furrows. In the same entry he pointed readers to earlier illustrations by Dillenius.

Early work on the lirellate Graphidaceae produced an unstable and contested set of generic names: during the 19th century, dozens of generic names were proposed for these "script lichens", and authors disagreed on which characters should define genera. A widely adopted late-19th-century scheme was that of Johannes Müller Argoviensis, who treated the non-stromatic, lirellate taxa as four spore-defined genera—Graphis (hyaline, transversely septate), Graphina (hyaline, muriform), Phaeographis (grey-brown, transverse) and Phaeographina (grey-brown, muriform)—alongside several stromatic genera. That framework was challenged by Edvard Vainio, who united the family in a single genus Graphis but retained comparable groupings at the rank of subgenus, and it was later reinstated in a more traditional form by Alexander Zahlbruckner. Despite early criticism that the approach was artificial, these spore-based genera remained in common use well into the 20th century, until later revisions began to prioritise ascoma anatomy over ascospore septation in defining natural genera.

The genus Graphis has been interpreted in both narrow and very broad ways. During the 19th and early 20th centuries, most classification in the lirellate Graphidaceae relied heavily on ascospore characters (especially spore colour and whether spores were only transversely septate or also muriform), which produced a set of "ascospore genera" used for many decades. That approach was increasingly regarded as artificial, because species that were otherwise very similar could be placed in different genera on ascospore septation alone. This problem was later framed in terms of "sporomorphs": look‑alike taxa separated mainly by spore type.

Modern generic limits in Graphidaceae were reshaped by revisions that emphasised ascoma anatomy, especially the structure of the lirellae (the elongate, slit-like fruiting bodies) and their excipulum (the ascoma wall). In the circumscription followed by Bettina Staiger (2002) and summarised by Robert Lücking (2009), Graphis is characterised by lirellae with well-developed, typically darkened labia that usually conceal the disc, an excipulum that is partly to completely carbonised, a hymenium that is usually not inspersed, and hyaline ascospores that are iodine-positive (I+) and range from transversely septate to muriform. Under this concept, many species formerly treated in Graphina are included within Graphis, while other taxa once placed in Graphis in a broad sense have been reassigned to genera such as Acanthothecis, Carbacanthographis, Diorygma, Dyplolabia, Fissurina, Glyphis and Hemithecium.

To evaluate which phenotype characters help delimit species and species groups, Lücking assessed 313 accepted species using a large set of morphological, anatomical and chemical characters analysed with numerical ordination and phenotype-based cladistic methods. A central finding was that the most informative character complex for recognising coherent groupings within Graphis is lirella morphology, especially how the lirellae emerge from the thallus and what kind of thalline margin they retain. By contrast, several traits that have often been treated as primary "key characters" (for example labial striation, the degree of excipulum carbonisation, and patterns in chemistry) can vary widely among otherwise similar species and may shift repeatedly across the genus, so they are most reliable when interpreted alongside the overall lirella type rather than used in isolation.

On this basis, Lücking outlined tentative species groups within Graphis defined mainly by lirella types, including the G. scripta group (about 90 species), G. subserpentina group (c. 20), G. acharii group (c. 60) and G. striatula group (c. 60), as well as smaller assemblages such as the G. nuda, G. dussii, G. marginata and G. symplecta groups; most currently accepted species could be assigned to one of these clusters. The study also broadened the older "sporomorph" idea into a general "morph" framework for sets of otherwise similar species that differ chiefly in one character complex (for example differences in excipulum carbonisation, hymenial inspersion, ascospore features, or secondary chemistry). These groupings were explicitly presented as a practical, phenotype-based working hypothesis for identification and for targeting future molecular sampling in a genus too large to be comprehensively sequenced at the time.

== Description ==
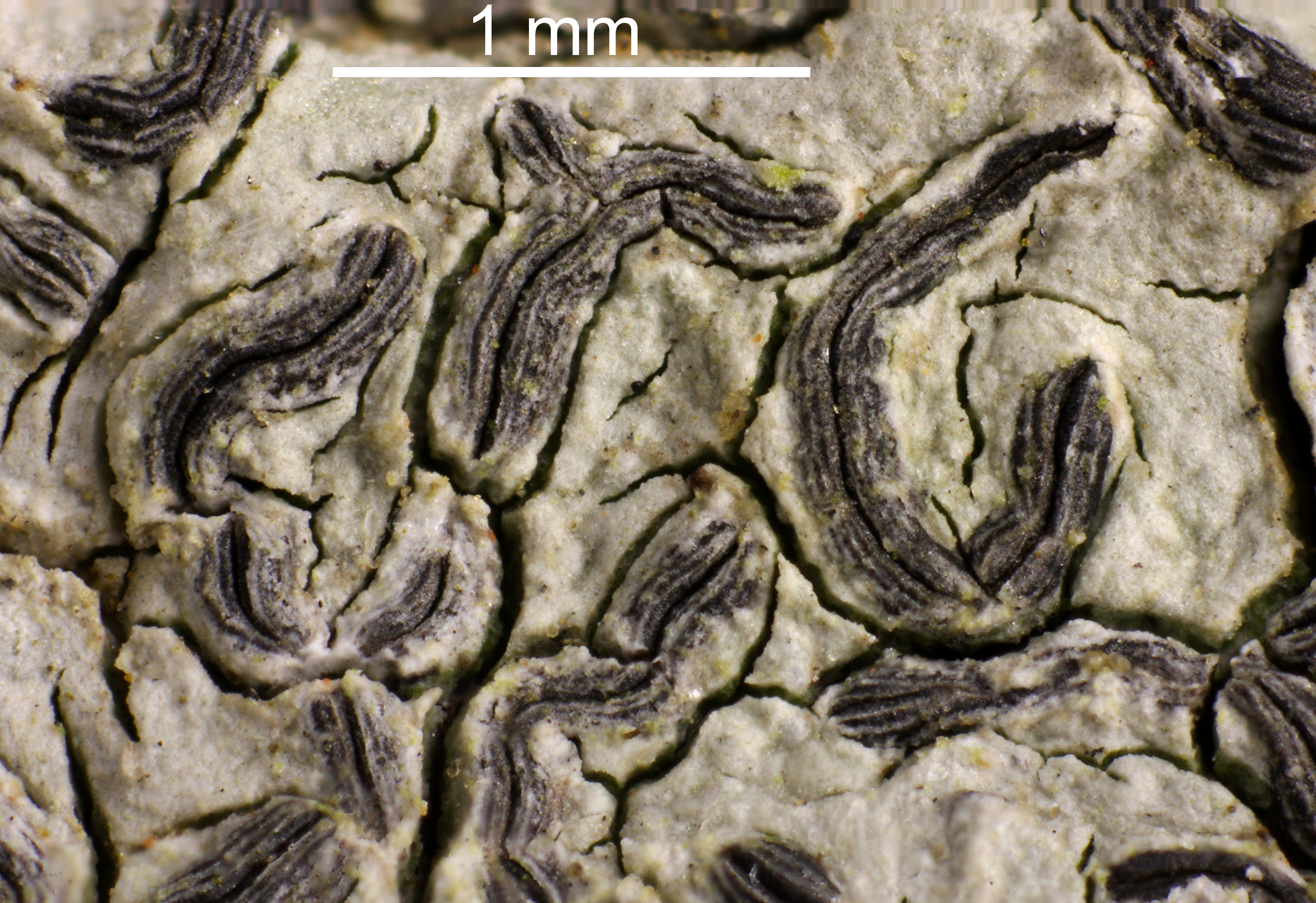
Graphis elegans

Genus Graphis includes crustose lichens, which have a crust-like appearance that can range from being fully embedded in the substrate to sitting on the surface. The lichen's symbiotic partner, or photobiont, is green algae from the genus Trentepohlia. The apothecia (fruiting bodies) of Graphis can also be immersed or superficial. These structures are typically elongated, resembling slits (referred to as lirelliform), and can be simple, branched, or star-shaped. The disc of the apothecium, where spores are released, often remains slit-like or closed. Unlike some lichens, Graphis lacks a thalline exciple, which is a rim of tissue derived from the lichen thallus surrounding the apothecium. Instead, it has a true exciple, which is usually black, opaque, and well-developed. This exciple is sometimes marked by longitudinal grooves.

Inside the apothecium, the hymenium (a spore-bearing layer) is colourless and does not react to staining with iodine (I-). Beneath this layer, the hypothecium can be either pale or dark, and it is relatively thin. The hamathecium, which supports the developing spores, consists of unbranched filaments called paraphyses. The spore-producing structures, the asci, typically contain up to eight spores. These asci are club-shaped to slightly cylindrical and release their spores through an apical split. The spores themselves are divided by transverse walls (septate) or have a muriform structure (multiple divisions), and they turn violet when stained with iodine as they mature. Initially colourless, these spores may darken to brown if they become over-mature. Graphis also produces conidia, which are asexual spores, within flask-shaped structures called pycnidia. The conidia are usually cylindrical to ellipsoidal and remain colourless.

Chemically, some species of Graphis contain compounds known as β-orcinol depsidones. Additionally, older apothecia in certain species might react with potassium hydroxide solution (K+) to produce a purple colouration, indicating the presence of anthraquinones.

Graphis can be distinguished from the genus Phaeographis by its colourless spores, which may become brown with age. Additionally, in the field, Graphis species may resemble Opegrapha species, but the latter can be differentiated by their distinctively structured asci and spore-bearing tissues.

== Habitat and distribution ==
Graphis has a cosmopolitan distribution, which includes most continents across the world. This includes Florida in North America. Ecologically, Graphis lichens are mostly found growing on bark, though they are occasionally found on rock. The genus is primarily distributed in tropical and subtropical regions, with a few extending into temperate zones.
