= Elfving =

Elfving is a Scandinavian surname. It may refer to:

- Åsa Elfving (born 1970), Swedish hockey player
- Betty Elfving (1837–1923), Finnish writer
- Carl-Axel Elfving (1920–1988), Swedish actor
- David Pizzoni Elfving (born 1985), Swedish bandy player
- Ester Elfving (1870–1950), Finnish writer
- Fredrik Elfving (1854–1942), Finnish botanist
- Gustav Elfving (1908–1984), Finnish mathematician and statistician
- Hilda Elfving (1827–1906), Swedish educator
- Östen Elfving (1874–1936), Finnish agronomist and politician
- Otto Elfving (1874–1944), Finnish politician
- Ulf Elfving (born 1942), Swedish journalist and broadcaster
- William J. Elfving (born 1941), American judge
