= Nomenclature codes =

Rulebooks of taxonomic nomenclature, in biology

Nomenclature codes or codes of nomenclature are the various rulebooks that govern the naming of living organisms. Standardizing the scientific names of biological organisms allows researchers to discuss findings (including the discovery of new species).

As the study of biology became increasingly specialized, specific codes were adopted for different types of organism.

To an end-user who only deals with names of species, with some awareness that species are assignable to genera, families, and other taxa of higher ranks, it may not be noticeable that there is more than one code, but beyond this basic level these are rather different in the way they work.

== Binomial nomenclature ==
In taxonomy, binomial nomenclature ("two-term naming system"), also called binary nomenclature, is a formal system of naming species of living things by giving each a name composed of two parts, both of which use Latin grammatical forms, although they can be based on words from other languages. Such a name is called a binomial name (which may be shortened to just "binomial"), a binomen, binominal name, or a scientific name; more informally it is also historically called a Latin name. In the zoological code, ICZN, the system is also called binominal nomenclature (using the suffix -inal instead of -ial), meaning "two-name naming system".

The first part of the name – the generic name – identifies the genus to which the species belongs, whereas the second part – the specific name or specific epithet – distinguishes the species within the genus. For example, modern humans belong to the genus Homo and within this genus to the species Homo sapiens. Tyrannosaurus rex is likely the most widely known non-human binomial.

The formal introduction of this system of naming species is credited to Carl Linnaeus, effectively beginning with his work Species Plantarum in 1753. But as early as 1622, Gaspard Bauhin introduced in his book Pinax theatri botanici (English, Illustrated exposition of plants) containing many names of genera that were later adopted by Linnaeus. The introduction of two-part names (binominal nomenclature) for species by Linnaeus was a welcome simplification because as our knowledge of biodiversity expanded, so did the length of the names, many of which had become unwieldy.

== Codification of scientific names ==
With all naturalists worldwide adopting binominal nomenclature, there arose several schools of thought about the details. It became ever more apparent that a detailed body of rules was necessary to govern scientific names. From the mid-19th century onwards, there were several initiatives to arrive at worldwide-accepted sets of rules. Presently nomenclature codes govern the naming of:

- Algae, Fungi and Plants – International Code of Nomenclature for algae, fungi, and plants (ICN), which in July 2011 replaced the International Code of Botanical Nomenclature (ICBN) and the earlier International Rules of Botanical Nomenclature.
- Animals – International Code of Zoological Nomenclature (ICZN).
- Bacteria and Archaea which are grown in cell culture – International Code of Nomenclature of Prokaryotes (ICNP), which in 2008 replaced the International Code of Nomenclature of Bacteria (ICNB).
- Bacteria and Archaea described from sequence data – Code of Nomenclature of Prokaryotes Described from Sequence Data (SeqCode).
- Cultivated plants – International Code of Nomenclature for Cultivated Plants (ICNCP).
- Plant associations – International Code of Phytosociological Nomenclature (ICPN).
- Viruses – The International Code of Virus Classification and Nomenclature (ICVCN); see also virus classification.

== Differences between codes ==
=== Starting point ===
The starting point, that is the time from which these codes are in effect (usually retroactively), varies from group to group, and sometimes from rank to rank. In botany and mycology, the starting point is often 1 May 1753 (Linnaeus, Species plantarum). In zoology, it is 1 January 1758 (Linnaeus, Systema Naturae, 10th Edition). On the other hand, bacteriology started anew, making a clean sweep in 1980 (Skerman et al., "Approved Lists of Bacterial Names"), although maintaining the original authors and dates of publication.

Exceptions in botany:

- Spermatophyta and Pteridophyta, suprageneric names: 4 August 1789 (Jussieu, Genera plantarum);
- Musci (except Sphagnaceae): 1 January 1801 (Hedwig, Species muscorum);
- Sphagnaceae and Hepaticae (including Anthocerotae), suprageneric names: 4 August 1789 (Jussieu, Genera plantarum);
- (Fungi:) Microsporidia are governed by the ICZN (treated as animals), and see below for fossil fungi;
- (Algae:)
  - Nostocaceae homocysteae: 1 January 1892 (Gomont, "Monographie des Oscillariées");
  - Nostocaceae heterocysteae: 1 January 1886 (Bornet & Flahault, "Révision des Nostocacées hétérocystées");
  - Desmidiaceae: 1 January 1848 (Ralfs, British Desmidieae);
  - Oedogoniaceae: 1 January 1900 (Hirn, "Monographie und Iconographie der Oedogoniaceen");
- Fossil plants, algae (diatoms excepted) and fungi: 31 December 1820 (Sternberg, Flora der Vorwelt).

Exceptions in zoology:

- Spiders: 1757 (Clerck, Aranei Svecici).

=== Workings ===
There are also differences in the way codes work. For example, the ICN (the code for algae, fungi and plants) forbids tautonyms, while the ICZN (the animal code) allows them.

=== Terminology ===
These codes differ in terminology, and there is a long-term project to "harmonize" this. For instance, the ICN uses "valid" in "valid publication of a name" (=the act of publishing a formal name), with "establishing a name" as the ICZN equivalent. The ICZN uses "valid" in "valid name" (="correct name"), with "correct name" as the ICN equivalent. Harmonization is making very limited progress.

=== Types ===
There are differences in respect of what kinds of types are used. The bacteriological code prefers living type cultures, but allows other kinds. There has been ongoing debate regarding which kind of type is more useful in a case like cyanobacteria.

== Other codes ==
=== BioCode ===
A more radical approach was made in 1997 when the IUBS/IUMS International Committee on Bionomenclature (ICB) presented the long debated Draft BioCode, proposed to replace all existing Codes with a harmonization of them. The originally planned implementation date for the BioCode draft was 1 January 2000, but agreement to replace the existing Codes was not reached.

In 2011, a revised BioCode was proposed that, instead of replacing the existing Codes, would provide a unified context for them, referring to them when necessary. Changes in the existing codes are slowly being made in the proposed directions. However, participants of the last serious discussion of the draft BioCode concluded that it would probably not be implemented in their lifetimes.

=== PhyloCode ===
Many authors encountered problems in using the Linnean system in phylogenetic classification. In fact, early proponents of rank-based nomenclature, such as Alphonse de Candolle and the authors of the 1886 version of the American Ornithologists' Union code of nomenclature already envisioned that in the future, rank-based nomenclature would have to be abandoned. Another Code that was developed since 1998 is the PhyloCode, which now regulates names defined under phylogenetic nomenclature instead of the traditional Linnaean nomenclature. This new approach requires using phylogenetic definitions that refer to "specifiers", analogous to "type" under rank-based nomenclature. Such definitions delimit taxa under a given phylogeny, and this kind of nomenclature does not require use of absolute ranks. The Code took effect in 2020, with the publication of Phylonyms, a monograph that includes a list of the first names established under that code.

== Ambiregnal protists ==
Some protists, sometimes called ambiregnal protists, have been considered to be both protozoa and algae, or protozoa and fungi, and names for these have been published under either or both of the ICZN and the ICN. The resulting double language throughout protist classification schemes resulted in confusion.

Groups claimed by both protozoologists and phycologists include euglenids, dinoflagellates, cryptomonads, haptophytes, glaucophytes, many heterokonts (e.g., chrysophytes, raphidophytes, silicoflagellates, some xanthophytes, proteromonads), some monadoid green algae (volvocaleans and prasinophytes), choanoflagellates, bicosoecids, ebriids and chlorarachniophytes.

Slime molds, plasmodial forms and other "fungus-like" organisms claimed by both protozoologists and mycologists include mycetozoans, plasmodiophorids, acrasids, and labyrinthulomycetes. Fungi claimed by both protozoologists and mycologists include chytrids, blastoclads, and the gut fungi.

Other problematic groups are the Cyanobacteria (ICNP/ICN), the Rozellida and Microsporidia (ICZN/ICN).

== Unregulated taxa ==
The zoological code does not regulate names of taxa lower than subspecies or higher than superfamily. There are many attempts to introduce some order on the nomenclature of these taxa, including the PhyloCode, the Duplostensional Nomenclatural System, and circumscriptional nomenclature.

The botanical code is applied primarily to the ranks of superfamily and below. There are some rules for names above the rank of superfamily, but the principle of priority does not apply to them, and the principle of typification is optional. These names may be either automatically typified names or be descriptive names. In some circumstances, a taxon has two possible names (e.g., Chrysophyceae Pascher, 1914, nom. descrip.; Hibberd, 1976, nom. typificatum). Descriptive names are problematic, once that, if a taxon is split, it is not obvious which new group takes the existing name. Meanwhile, with typified names, the existing name is taken by the new group that still bears the type of this name. However, typified names present special problems for microorganisms.

== See also ==
- Binomial nomenclature
- Botanical nomenclature
- Chemical nomenclature
- Common name
- Gene nomenclature
- Glossary of scientific naming
- List of taxa named by anagrams
- Zoological nomenclature
- Tree of life (biology)

== Bibliography ==
- Lahr, Daniel J. G.; Lara, Enrique; Mitchell, Edward A. D. (2012). "Time to regulate microbial eukaryote nomenclature". Biological Journal of the Linnean Society. 107 (3): 469–476. doi:10.1111/j.1095-8312.2012.01962.x.
- McNeill, J.; Barrie, F. R.; Buck, W. R.; Demoulin, V.; Greuter, W.; Hawksworth, D. L.; Herendeen, P. S.; Knapp, S.; Marhold, K.; Prado, J.; Prud'homme Van Reine, W. F.; Smith, G. F.; Wiersema, J. H.; Turland, N. J. (2012). International Code of Nomenclature for algae, fungi, and plants (Melbourne Code) adopted by the Eighteenth International Botanical Congress Melbourne, Australia, July 2011. Vol. Regnum Vegetabile 154. A.R.G. Gantner Verlag KG. ISBN 978-3-87429-425-6.
- Turland, N. J.; Wiersema, J. H.; Barry, F. R.; Greuter, W.; Hawksworth, D. L.; Herendeen, P. S.; Knapp, S.; Kusber, W. H.; Li, D.-Z.; Marhold, K.; May, T. W.; McNeill, J.; Monro, A. M.; Prado, J.; Price, M. J.; Smith, G. F. (2018). International Code of Nomenclature for algae, fungi, and plants (Shenzhen Code) adopted by the Nineteenth International Botanical Congress Shenzhen, China, July 2017. Vol. Regnum Vegetabile 159. Koeltz Botanical Books. ISBN 978-3-946583-16-5.
