= Fredrik Elfving =

Finnish botanist

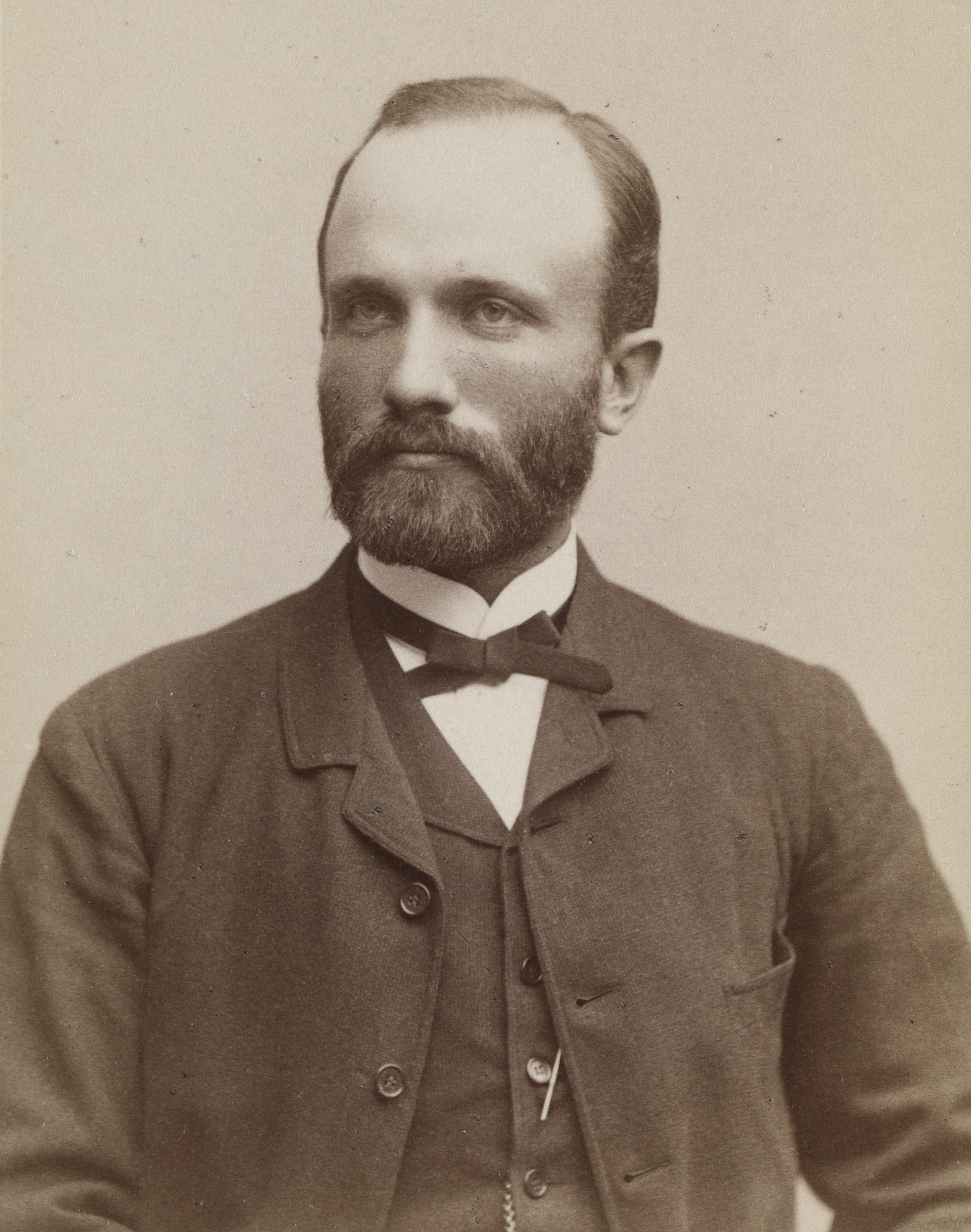
- Portrait of Elfving, 1870s
- Born: 9 December 1854; Ekenäs, Finland
- Died: 21 June 1942 (aged 87); Helsinki, Finland
- Education: University of Helsinki
- Awards: Order of Saint Anna, 3rd Class (1902), Commander of the Order of the White Rose of Finland (1919), Commander First Class of the Order of the White Rose of Finland (1933)
- Scientific career
- Fields: Botany, plant physiology
- Workplaces: University of Helsinki
- Author abbrev. (botany): Elfving

Fredrik Emil Volmar Elfving (9 December 1854 – 21 June 1942) was a Swedish-speaking Finnish botanist, plant physiologist, and university administrator. During his university training, he frequently traveled abroad to learn new scientific methods and techniques from other prominent European scientists. Although his earliest publications dealt with phytogeography and phycology (particularly the green algae known as the desmids), his most notable research was in plant physiology. Early in his career, he published seminal work on the flow of water through the stems of woody plants, and investigated the phenomenon of transversely geotropic plant organs. In contrast to his works on plant physiology, his later experiments and views on lichens, which he himself considered his most important work, was far less favourably received.

Elfving became a Professor of botany at the University of Helsinki in 1892, a position he held until his retirement in 1926. A lively and enthusiastic teacher, Elfving revolutionized the teaching of botany at the university by introducing laboratory courses that emphasized the study of plant physiology, rather than taxonomy, as had been the tradition. During his time as professor, Elfving wrote many historical papers about scientific societies, and biographies of Scandinavian scientists. He wrote the books Tärkeimmät viljelyskasvit ("The Most Important Crops") and the Kasvitieteen oppikirja ("Botanical Textbook"), which were widely used as textbooks. Elfving has had several taxa named after him.

== Early life and education ==
Elfving was born on 9 December 1854 in Ekenäs, Southern Finland, to parents Johan Fredrik and Wendla Elfving. His father, who was originally the son of a blacksmith, rose exceptionally high in the order of estates (a system of social hierarchy prevalent in Christian Europe), becoming a professor and district doctor. His mother, Wendla Elfving (née Sucksdorff), belonged to a Loviisa bourgeois family. Fredrik was the youngest of nine children. His eldest sister, Betty Elfving (1837–1923), became an author of popular historical novels in Finland.

Elfving developed an interest in natural history as a child, and became familiar with the local cryptogam flora – mosses, lichens, and algae. Access to a microscope, given to him by his parents on his 15th birthday, enhanced his interest in this field. Elfving graduated with honours from Turku High School in 1870.

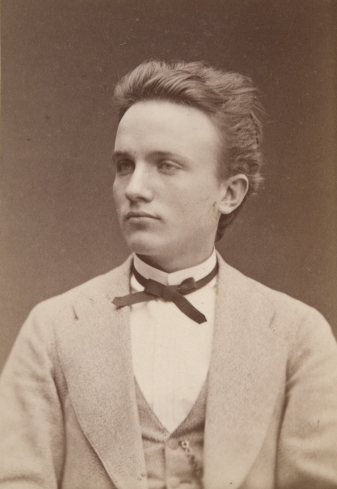
Elfving in 1873, about 19 years old

He intended to enter medical school, but first had to obtain a Candidate of Philosophy degree, with a specialization in botany. His instructor, Sextus Otto Lindberg, found Elfving to be a talented student, and assisted and encouraged him with his botanical studies. With the support of the university, Elfving stayed in Stockholm and Uppsala in Sweden for six weeks in the autumn of 1873 to study phycology.

Elfving obtained his Candidate of Philosophy degree on 21 December 1874, at age 20, having performed exceptionally in his final exams. This allowed him to enrol in medical school, but he still continued with his botanical activities. In 1875 he took a trip to Russian Karelia to investigate the plant life around the river Svir. After a couple of years in medical school, Elfving gave up his plan to become a doctor. Elfving obtained a Master's degree in philosophy on 31 May 1877, and officially began training in botany in 1878 after moving to Germany. Elfving's first scientific publication, titled Anteckningar om vegetationen kring floden Svir ("Notes on the vegetation around the river Svir"), dealt with phytogeography. It was the first reasonably complete compilation of the flora of this region, and was largely modelled upon Johan Petter Norrlin's 1875 work Flora Kareliae Onegensis.

From 1878 to 1879 he completed his studies in Germany, first learning cytology with Eduard Strasburger in Jena and then in Würzburg with Julius von Sachs. The experiments he performed with Sachs formed the basis of his doctoral dissertation, which he defended successfully in 1879 at the age of 24. It was titled Studier öpver geotropiska växtdelar ("Studies on geotropic plant parts"). Elfving became a Doctor of Philosophy on 3 February 1880. In 1881, he was appointed docent of botany. Also that year, Elfving published Anteckningar om finska Desmidieer ("Notes on Finnish Desmids"), in which he enumerated 258 species of the Desmidiales, nine of them new to science. This work helped initiate the study of phycology in Finland.

=== Studies abroad ===
Later in 1880, Elfving went abroad to study under the supervision of Heinrich Anton de Bary in Strasbourg, France. At the invitation of the Finnish National Board of Medicine, he participated in the preparation of a new pharmacopoeia for Finland in the winter of 1883. In 1886–87, wanting to learn about new methods for culturing bacteria and other micro-organisms, Elfving went to Copenhagen, Denmark to learn these techniques from fermentation physiologist Emil Christian Hansen and the physician and bacteriologist Carl Julius Salomonsen. He then studied for a few months under George Engelmann in Utrecht, The Netherlands, and then with Gaston Bonnier and Émile Duclaux in Paris from December 1886 to March 1887. Elfving attended academic conferences in Stockholm (1880), in Kristiania (1886), and in Berlin (1886).

== Career ==
In 1885, Sextus Otto Lindberg proposed that Elfving should be appointed associate professor, emphasizing his outstanding record as a teacher. The newly appointed professor of zoology, Johan Axel Palmén, objected to the proposal, suggesting that the comparative merits of Elfving and the other docent, Edvard August Vainio, be compared for fairness, especially considering that Vainio had a far superior record as an independent researcher. Although Lindberg's proposal was upheld by a majority in the Department of Natural Sciences, the matter was shelved at a higher level and the initiative went nowhere.

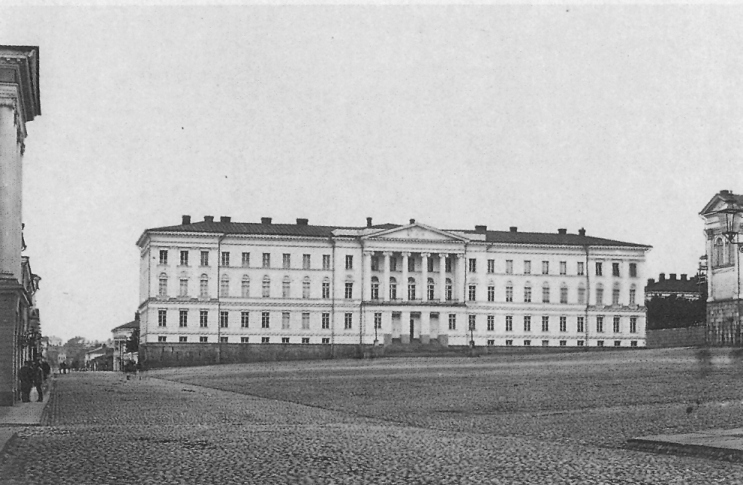
Imperial Alexander University around 1870

After the death of Lindberg in 1889, the position of Professor of Botany was opened. After a competition with the other docents Edvard Vainio and Oswald Kairamo, Elfving was appointed to the position. Elfving was the chairman of the Societas pro Fauna et Flora Fennica (Finland's oldest scientific society) from 1892–1911, and he was the permanent secretary of the Societas Scientiarum Fennica (Finnish Society of Sciences and Letters) starting in 1923. Elfving also served as Dean of the Department of Physics and Mathematics from 1911 to 1924. A professor for 34 years, Elfving retired at the age of 71 in 1926.

Elfving helped contribute to the acceptance of Darwinism in Finnish academia. In 1883, a year after Charles Darwin's death, the idea of placing a commemorative statue of him in the British Museum of Natural History spread throughout Europe. A petition to that effect was published in the Finnish newspapers, and it was signed by, among others, five prominent biologists, one of which was Elfving.

In the late nineteenth-century Finnish academic circles, some of the students and faculty from upper class-backgrounds were prejudiced against people from the lower social classes, whom the expansion of schooling in the 1880s had enabled to study at universities. This led to debate on whether there were now too many students, and what inflationary effect this was having on standards. Elfving wrote in 1885: "We know all too well those young men with questionable talent and even more questionable tidiness, who are from uncultivated homes sent to study at university. After their studies they begin to talk about the 'cause of the people' as apostles of civilization in various parts of the country." Elfving's concern about lower-class 'apostles of civilization' preaching Finnish nationalism was not groundless, since about half of the teachers that had been Vyborg Nation students (a collective name for those from Viipuri Province, a now historical province that was later ceded to the Soviet Union after the Winter War) came from a lower-class background. In contrast, Ernst Gustaf Palmén, who was Elfving's colleague, explained that in his experience, the worst students actually came from upper-class families. To get into university, lower-class students had been already forced to show that they were both talented and studious.

In 1894, Elfving started an inquiry into the distribution of plants in Finland. From the 373 responses he received, he assembled the work Anteckningar om kulturväxterna i Finland ("Notes on the culture of plants in Finland"), which was considered an important summary of the cultivated and decorative plants in late nineteenth-century Finland. In the work Atlas de Finlande (1899, 1910) Elfving and Arvi Grotenfelt contributed short surveys of economically important cultivated plants in Finland.

In the early decades of the twentieth century, the language issue in Finland stirred up debate in academia. At the time, although both the Finnish and Swedish were commonly used in Finland, the latter language was associated with descendants of Swedish colonisation, which led to class tensions among the speakers of the different languages. Swedish was largely used in academic settings, and was the predominant language of the upper class. Elfving, although himself a Swedish speaker, strongly supported the use of Finnish in academia. This led to the establishment in 1925, alongside his position of Chair of Botany, of a new professorship in Finnish. Kaarlo Linkola was appointed to this position. After Elfving's retirement, the duties of the head of the department were transferred to the holder of the new Finnish-language chair. Eventually, in 1928, Alvar Palmgren was elected as the new Swedish-speaking professor of botany, filling Elfving's old position.

=== Research ===
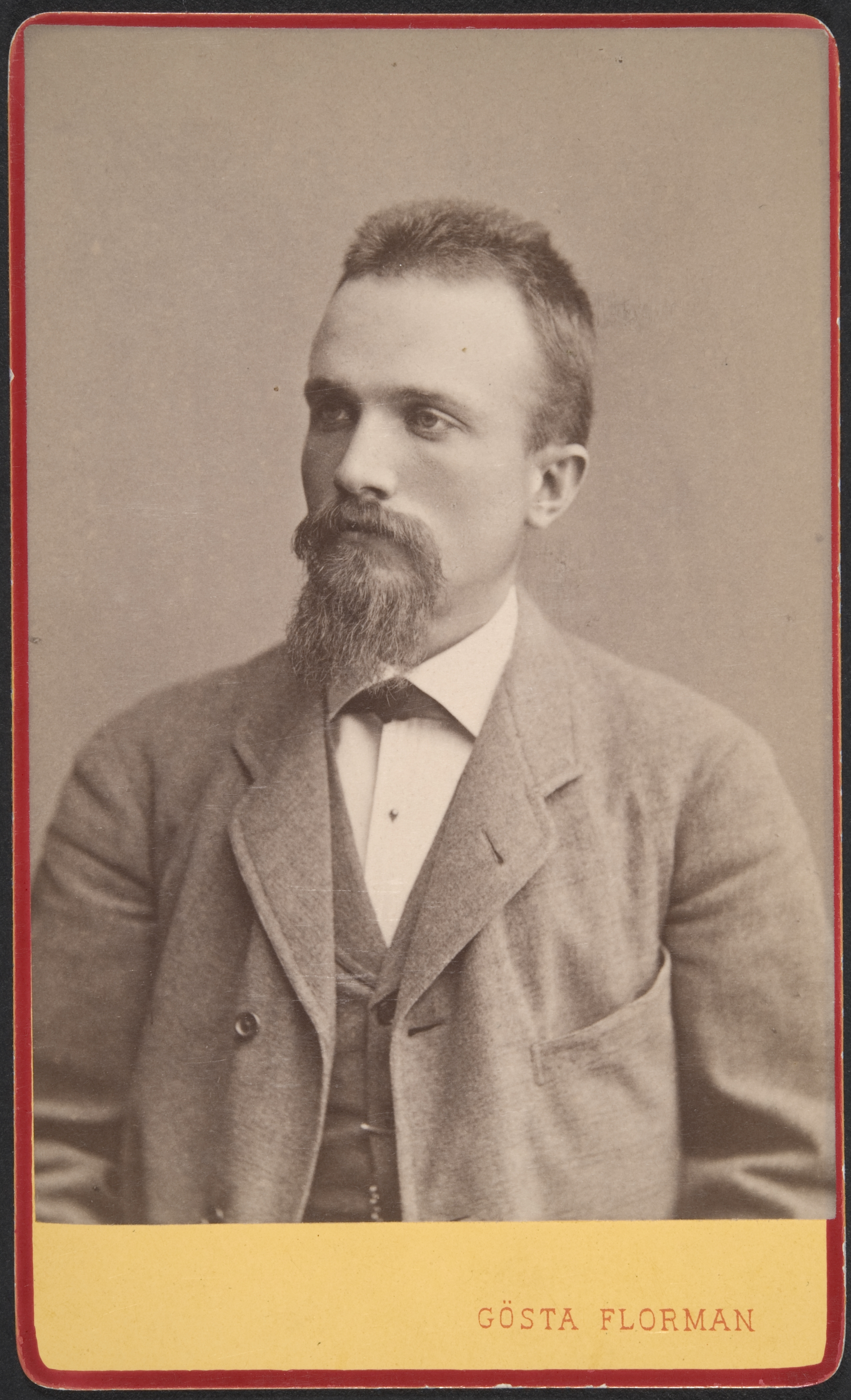
Fredrik Elfving in 1880, age 26

==== Plant physiology ====
Elfving's doctoral dissertation studied the reason why the rhizomes of many plants take up a horizontal position in the soil. His research determined that the tips invariably turned in such a direction as to bring the longitudinal axis back into a horizontal position in the ground, a reaction caused by the force of gravity. So in addition to having positively and negatively geotropic organs, the plant also has organs that orient themselves at right angles to the direction of the gravitational pull – these are called transversely geotropic. Although the idea had been suggested previously by Albert Bernhard Frank in 1868, Elfving was the first to prove it experimentally. Frank believed the transversely geotropic organs had an upper side that faced upwards; Elfving showed that this was not true for rhizomes, since if they were turned round their own longitudinal axis 180°, they continued to grow without any torsion.

In 1882, Elfving published the results of an investigation carried out in de Bary's laboratory into the flow of water through ligneous stems. At the time, it was widely believed that the water did not flow through the lumina of the vessels, but in their walls, the so-called "inbibition theory" proposed by Julius von Sachs. Elfving disproved the idea in an experiment in which he caused melted cocoa butter to be sucked into the stem of a freshly cut Taxus, which he then allowed to cool and harden. Microscopic examination showed that the fat had filled the lumina of the vessels but had not penetrated into their walls. The stem's ability to conduct water was virtually eliminated, showing that water did indeed flow through the lumina, and disproving Sach's theory.

==== Views on lichens ====
In contrast to Elfving's works on plant physiology, which have generally stood the test of time, his views on lichens, which he himself considered his most important work, was far less favourably received. In his class teachings, Elfving had initially subscribed to the generally accepted view on the dual nature of lichens as proposed by Simon Schwendener in 1867, i.e. that lichens are composite organisms comprising both fungi and algae (i.e. mycobiont and photobiont). As time passed, however, his doubts about the validity of this theory grew. He questioned whether it was conceivable that lichens were the result of a "continually repeated accident" – the chance meeting of fungus and alga. He thought that if he could show that there was a genetic connection between the two components of the lichen, it would effectively destroy Schwenderer's theory.

After many years of research, Elfving published Untersuchungen über Flechtengonidien ("Studies on lichen gonidia") in 1913. In this work, he claimed that he had established by microscopic observation that the gonids (an old term in lichenology for the algal cells of the thallus) originated in the hyphae, and proclaimed that Schwenderer's theory must therefore be abandoned. However, by 1913, it was well-established that the "gonids" in the lichen thallus are actual green and blue-green algal cells, and if Elfving's view were to be accepted, it would essentially overturn the entire taxonomy of cryptogams. Although he understood the revolutionary implications of his hypothesis, he remained unwavering, certain that he would ultimately be proven to be correct. It has been suggested that his method of using material that had been fixed, cut, dyed (rather than keeping a direct watch on development in vivo) gave the false impression of a continuous process of development, leading to erroneous interpretations of his observations. His work was either criticized, or ignored completely. He published a continuation of his research 18 years later, titled Weitere Untersuchungen über Flechtengonidien ("Further studies on lichen gonidia"), which he started with the motto E pur si muove. This work was met with a reception similar to his previous one, including another sharp rebuttal by Wilhelm Nienburg. Although Elfving's conclusions about the nature of lichens were erroneous, his student Runar Collander has suggested that his research did have at least one useful outcome, by elaborating "the element of improbability in the widely and perhaps unthinkingly accepted notion that every individual lichen occurring in nature was necessarily the outcome of an accidental encounter between an alga and a fungus". The understanding of lichen biology and reproduction is now much more nuanced, and we know that in some lichen species independent dispersal and reconstitution of the thallus is common, while in other species, new lichens are created from existing lichens by means of specialized thallus propagules that contain both mycobiont and photobiont, such as soredia and isidia.

=== Students ===
As part of his duties as Professor of Botany, Elfving mentored a number of students who undertook research in plant physiology. Doctoral dissertations resulting from these collaborations include the following: Walter Laurén (1891), who studied the influence of ether vapour on germinating plants; Widar Brenner (1914); on the nitrogen nutrition of the fungal genus Aspergillus; Minna Rancken (later Forss) (1914), on the occurrence of starch in bryophytes; Runar Collander (1919) on thermotropism in plants; Harry Warén (later Waris) (1920) on pure cultures of lichen gonidia; and Hanna Lappalainen (1920) on trace element requirements and starch formation in Aspergillus. Elfving's students who specialized in phycology include the following: Karl Engelbrecht Hirn, who specialized in the family Oedogoniaceae; Alexander Luther, who proposed the existence of the Heterokontae; Rolf Grönblad; Carl Emil Cedercreutz; and Kaarlo Mainio Levander.

== Personal ==
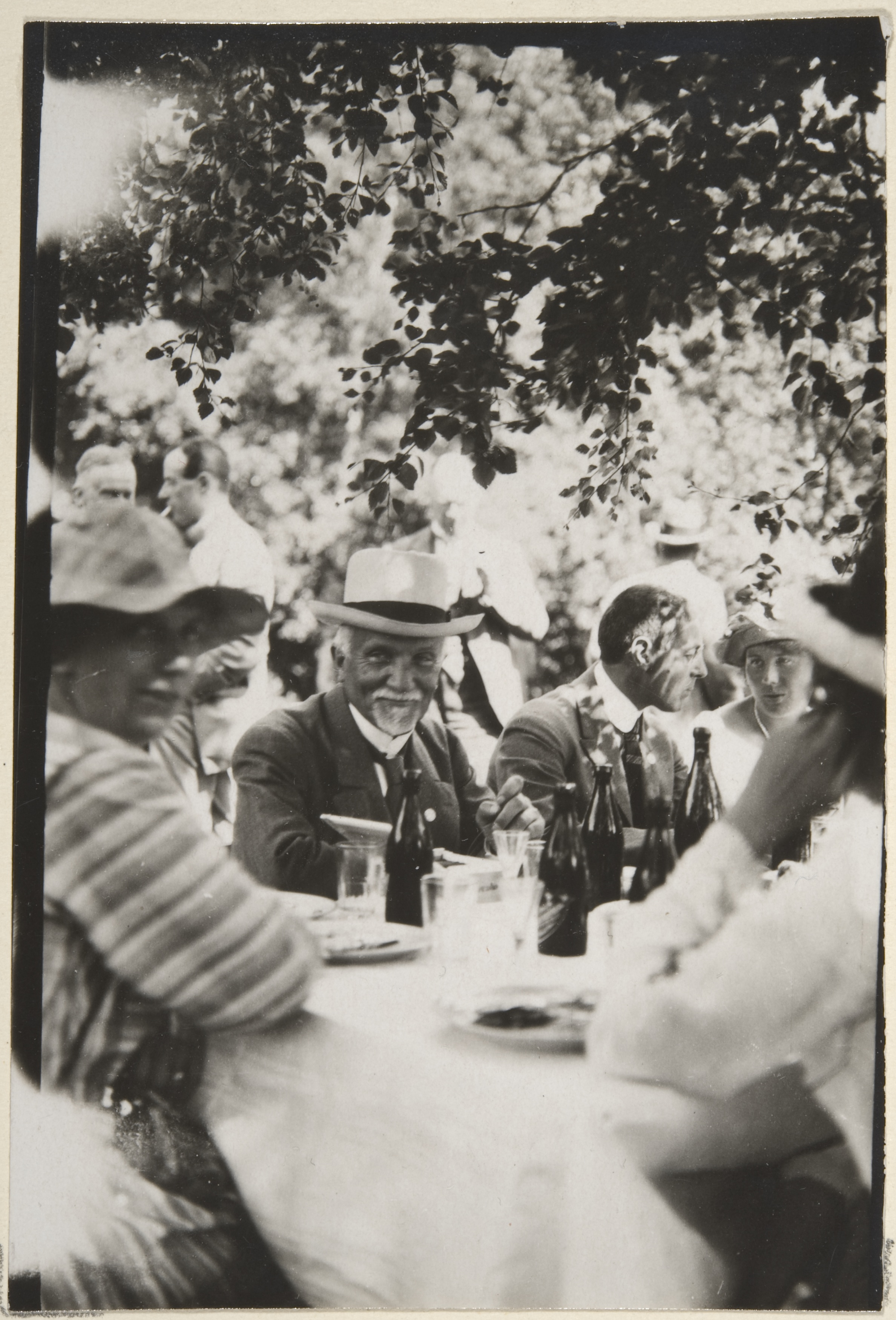
Fredrik and Thyra Elfving in Helsinki in the mid-1920s

Elfving married Thyra Ingman (1870–1939), with whom he had four children, two girls and two boys: Rabbe Fredrik Elfving (1899–1966), Brita Elfving (1900–1917), Astrid Elfving (later Kyreniua) (1902–1982), and Erik Gustav Elfving (1908–1984). His youngest son Erik Gustav became a well-known mathematician and statistician.

Regarding his personality, his former student Runar Collander noted: "Elfving stood in a class by himself, combining a strict sense of duty with an exceptional charm. He was renown for his skill in repartee, and his witty, lapidary remarks were widely quoted." Early in his career he would often engage in polemics on general cultural subjects, often on the pages of the journal Finsk Tidskrift. He was at one time on the editorial board of this journal, starting in 1877, and later became one of its publishers, from October 1883 to December 1885. He also frequently wrote for Helsingfors Dagblad, a Swedish-language newspaper published from 1861 to 1889. Collander writes of the "curious duality" of Elfving's nature:

On the one hand he was a clear-headed, sober scientist, an empiricist and rationalist who hated imprecision of any kind. Yet at the same time he had in him an element of romanticism which sometimes bordered on the fanciful. Elfving the romantic believed that he knew the truth intuitively, and to his intuitions he would cling with the utmost obstinacy even if he had the whole world against him. He was extraordinarily prone to pursue peculiar ideas of his own, displaying a sovereign disregard for recognized authorities and received opinions. It is not surprising that the publications of so self-assured and adventurous a thinker should occasionally strike us as having a touch of amateurishness about them.

Fredrik Elfving died in Helsinki on 21 June 1942, at the age of 87.

== Legacy ==
Elfving was one of the first researchers in plant physiology in the Nordic countries. In the 1880s, Elfving published a number of plant physiological studies, helping to raise the profile of plant physiology as a science to counterbalance the emphasis placed on taxonomy and morphology prevalent since the influential publications of Carl Linnaeus. Of the native plants, Elfving specifically studied certain algae (in particular, the family Desmidiaceae) as well as crops. In all, during his career, he published about 50 original studies.

Elfving was a keen historian, and wrote numerous biographical articles, the first of which dealt with Linnaeus. In addition, he wrote about the history of science of Finland and the university. He made centenary accounts of Finland's two oldest scientific societies, the Societas pro Fauna et Flora Fennica and Societas Scientiarum Fennica. Elfving was noted for his "highly developed historical sense" and his "skill in the production of vivid and sharply-etched portraits of personalities."

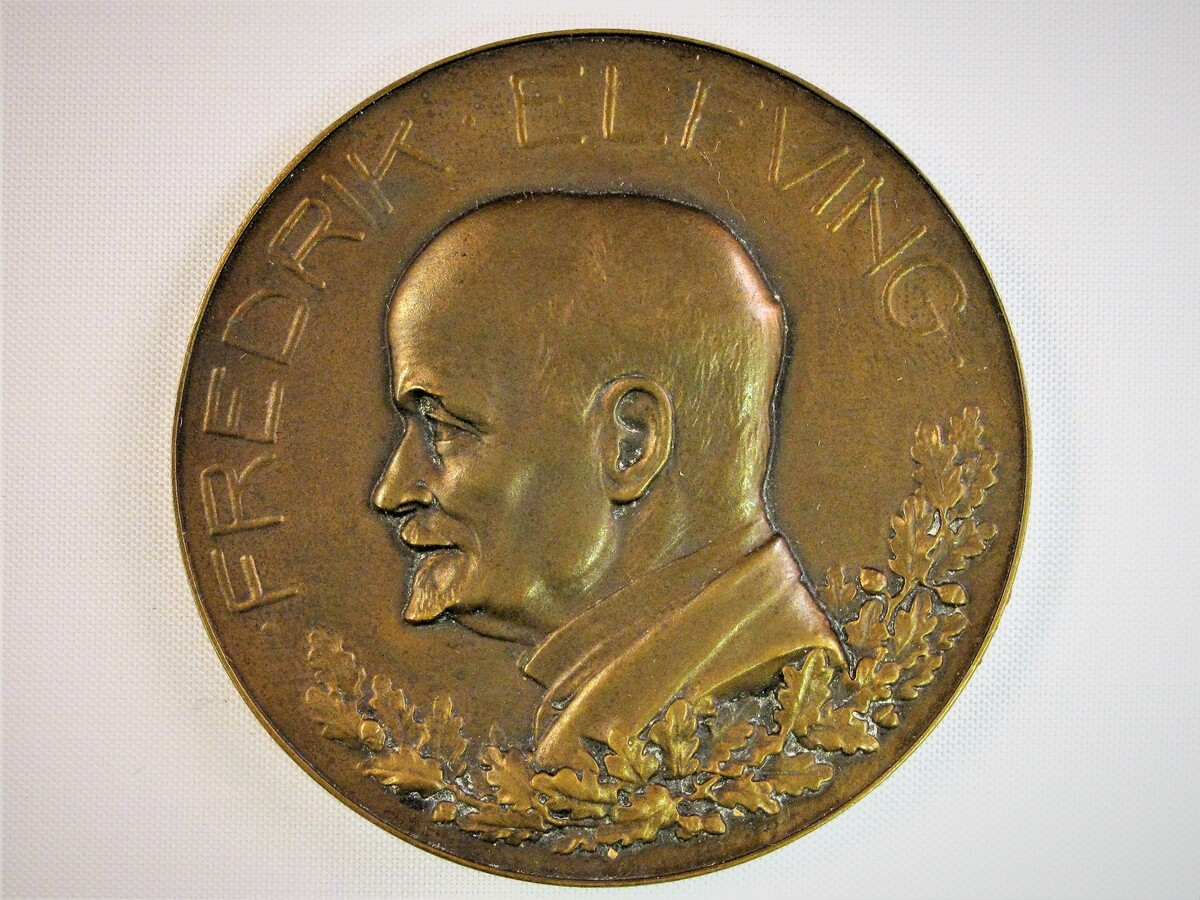
Commemorative medal with image of Finnish academic Fredrik Elfving, presented to him on 11 December 1924

Elfving developed methods for teaching university botany and introduced, among other things, laboratory courses. He introduced microscope training as applied to vascular plant anatomy in 1880, the year before his appointment as docent. A decade later, this course was made compulsory for all botany students. This first laboratory course was later followed by a microscope course in cryptogam systematics, class work in experimental plant physiology, and courses in organography and seed plant taxonomy. Sometimes, more specialized courses were arranged for students especially interested in botany. Topics included the examination of microscopic algae and the cultivation of bacteria. Contemporaries praised his lecturing skills. Elfving had developed a reputation as a "very colorful and strong personality" and an "excessively demanding teacher". Botany was still a compulsory minor for medical students in the early 20th century, which made the medical faculty upset by the fact that Elfving was allegedly severely hindering the studies of medical students, even though botany was not particularly relevant to medicine itself. His son Gustav, who had his own academic career at the University of Helsinki, would later recall meeting people who, upon hearing his last name, "immediately recalled the feared oral examination given by his father some decades ago, which they had flunked several times!"

Elfving published several textbooks that would help him and others teach their botanical courses more efficiently. The first edition of Kasvitieteen oppikirja ("Botanical Textbook") appeared in 1903, the fourth in 1930. Deviktigaste kulturväxterna was first published in 1895. Two other texts he published were Växtanatomiska öfningar ("Exercises in plant anatomy") (1889) and Förare genom Växthusen i Helsingfors Botaniska Trädgärd (1904), a guide to Helsinki's botanical gardens aimed at both the general public as well as the first-year university student. The texts were well received and described as featuring clear and concise presentation, similar to the teaching style of Elfving.

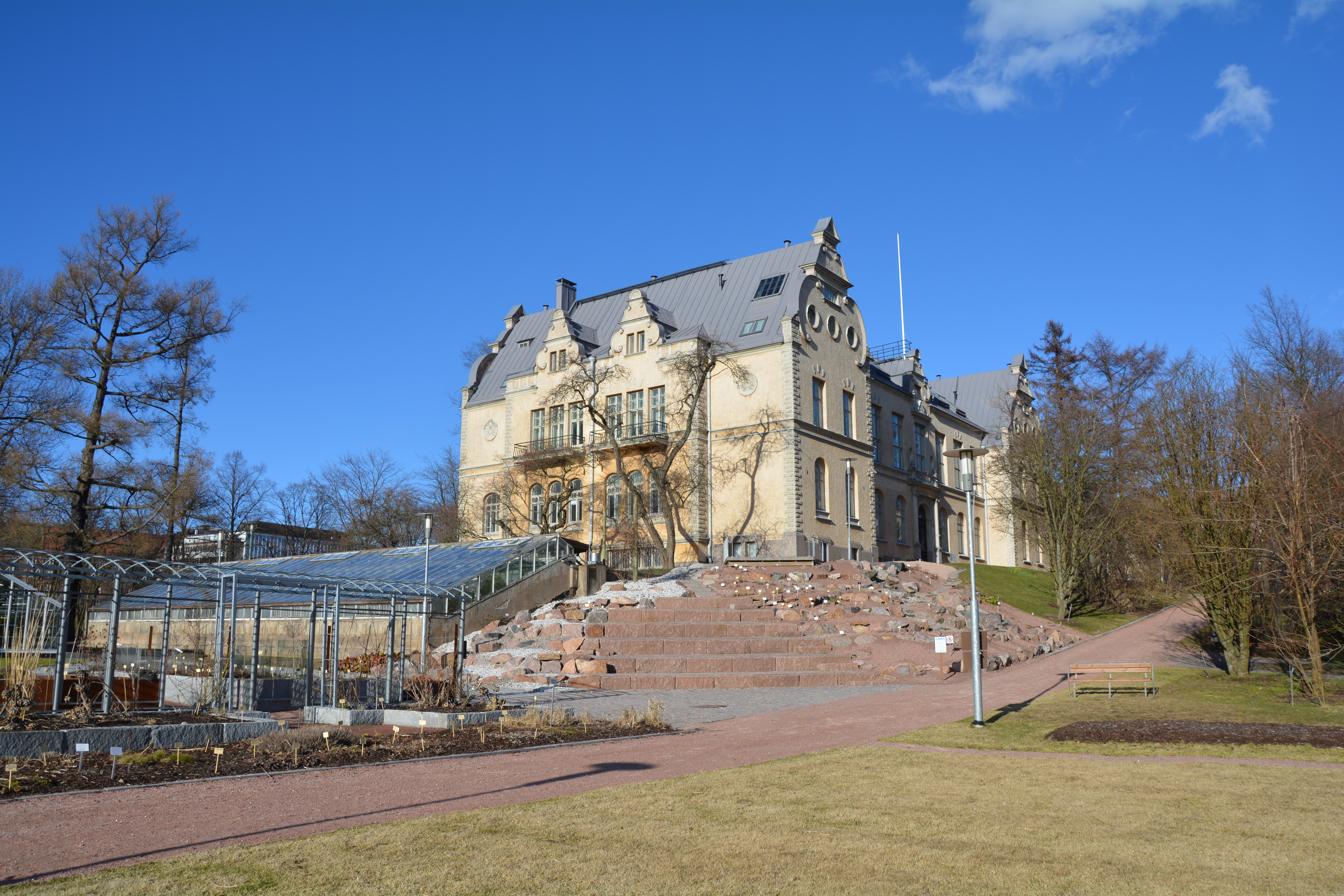
The botanical museum at Kaisaniemi Botanic Garden, Finnish Museum of Natural History – LUOMUS, University of Helsinki

The Department of Botany, which was completed in 1903 in Kaisaniemi, Helsinki, and now houses the University's Botanical Museum, was built on Elfving's initiative and according to his plans. Elfving worked for the Institute of Botanics in the Botanical Garden and lived with his family at the Professor's residence. He worked hard to acquire numerous species of shrubs and trees in his role as director of the Botanical Garden, and the greenhouses became a landmark attraction.

Elfving received the Order of Saint Anna, 3rd Class (1902), Commander of the Order of the White Rose of Finland (1919), and Commander First Class of the Order of the White Rose of Finland (1933).

=== Eponymy ===
Taxa that have been named after Elfving (eponyms) include the polypore genus Elfvingia P.Karst. (1889); the lichen taxa Rhizocarpon grande f. elfvingii Vain. (1922), Aspicilia elfvingii Vain. (1931), and Celidium varians subsp. elfvingii Räsänen (1944); the algae Cosmarium elfvingii Raciborski (1885), and Diploneis elfvingiana C.W.Fontell (1917); the flowering plant Hieracium elfvingii Norrl. (1904); and the wasp Phygadeuon elfvingi (Hellen, 1967).

== Selected publications ==
- Elfving, F. (1878). "Anteckningar om vegetationen kring floden Svir" [Notes on the vegetation around the River Svir]. Meddelanden af Societas Pro Fauna et Flora Fennica. 2: 113–170.
- ———— (1879). Studier öfver geotropiska växtdelar [Studies of geotropic plant parts] (Licentiate thesis). Helsinki: University of Helsinki.
- ———— (1882). "Über die Wasserleitung in Holz" [About the water pipe in wood]. Botanische Zeitung (in German). 42: 706–723.
- ———— (1890). Studien über die Einwirkung des Lichtes auf die Pilze [Studies of the effects of light on fungi] (in German). Helsinki: Akademische Abhandlung. pp. 1–142.
- ———— (1899). "William Nylander. Ett biografiskt utkast" [William Nylander. A biographical draft]. Finsk Tidskrift (in Swedish). 47: 309–331, 401–422.
- ———— (1904). Förare genom Växthusen i Helsingfors Botaniska Trädgård [Guide to the Greenhouses in Helsinki Botanical Gardens].
- ———— (1913). Untersuchungen über die Flechtengonidien [Studies on the lichen gonidia].
- ———— (1921). "Societas pro Fauna et Flora Fennica 1821–1921". Meddelanden af Societas pro Fauna et Flora Fennica. 50: 1–279.
- ———— (1938). Finska Vetenskaps-Societetens historia 1838–1938 [The history of the Finnish Society of Sciences]. Societas Scientiarum Fennica, Commentationes Humanarum Litterarum (in Swedish). Vol. 10. Helsinki: Akademische Buchhandlung. pp. 1–310.
