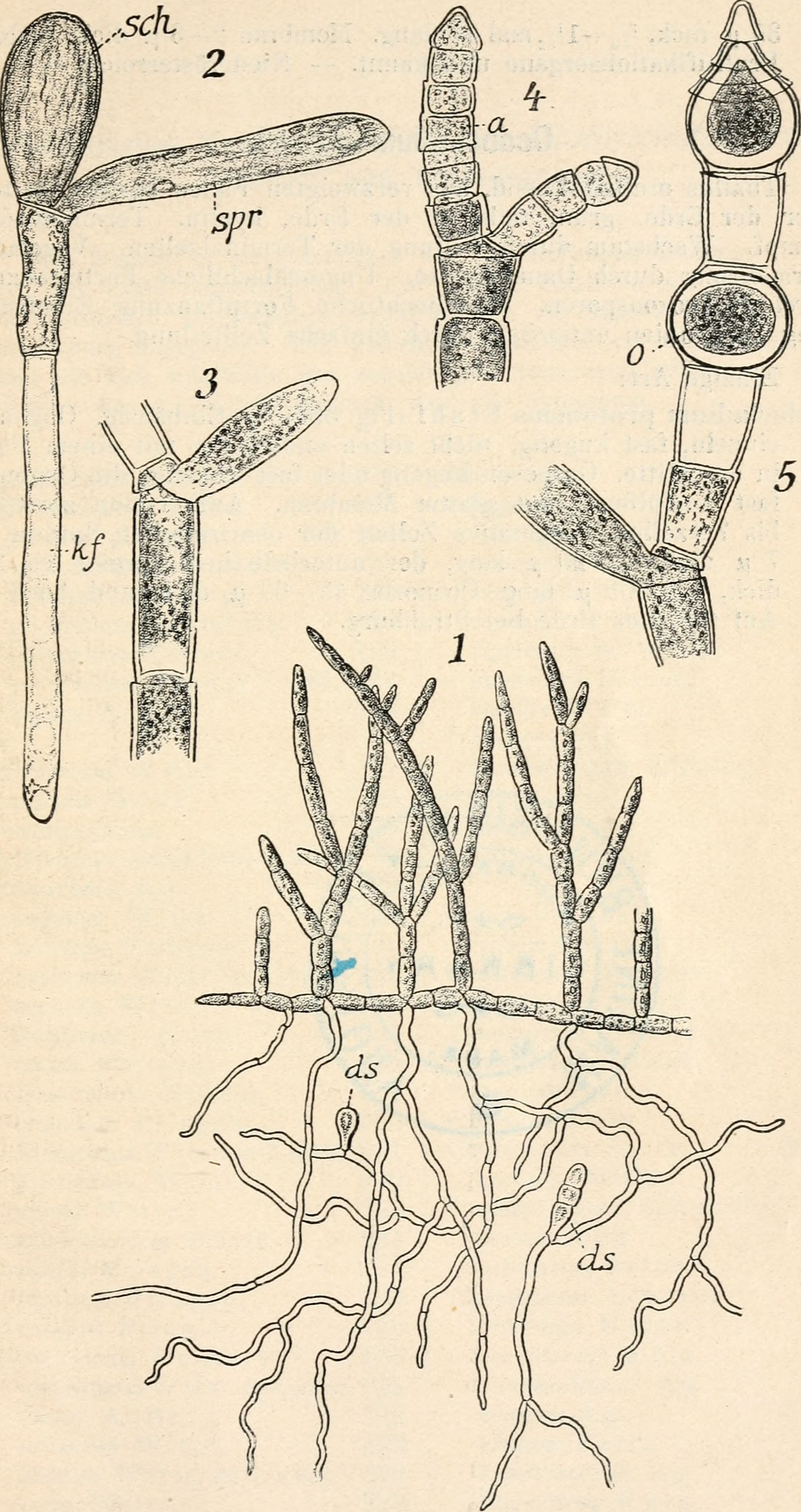
- Oedocladium protonema

Scientific classification
- Kingdom: Plantae
- Division: Chlorophyta
- Class: Chlorophyceae
- Order: Oedogoniales
- Family: Oedogoniaceae
- Genus: Oedocladium; Stahl ex Hirn

Type species
- Oedocladium protonema Stahl ex Hirn

Species
- Oedocladium carolinianum; Oedocladium prescottii

= Oedocladium =

Genus of algae

Oedocladium is an uncommon genus of green algae in the order Oedogoniales. It is terrestrial, growing in soil or occasionally in fresh water.

== Description ==
Oedocladium consists of uniseriate, branched filaments. When growing on soil, filaments creep along the ground, with narrow hyaline rhizoidal branches growing into the soil. Apical cells of filaments are often conically pointed. Vegetative cells are cylindrical, uninucleate, with a parietal, reticulate chloroplast with one to several pyrenoids. The vegetative cells divide in a similar fashion to those of Oedogonium.

== Life cycle ==
Oedocladium reproduces both sexually and asexually. Asexual reproduction typically occurs via multiflagellate zoospores, or less commonly akinetes or fragmentation of filaments.

Sexual reproduction is oogamous. Oedocladium may be monoecious or dioecious. The oogonia is borne on a single supporting cell called the suffultory cell, and are borne singly or in series at the ends of filaments. Oogonia produce a single egg, which are fertilized by multiflagellate sperm cells. The resulting zygospore eventually turns red and develops a thick cell wall.
