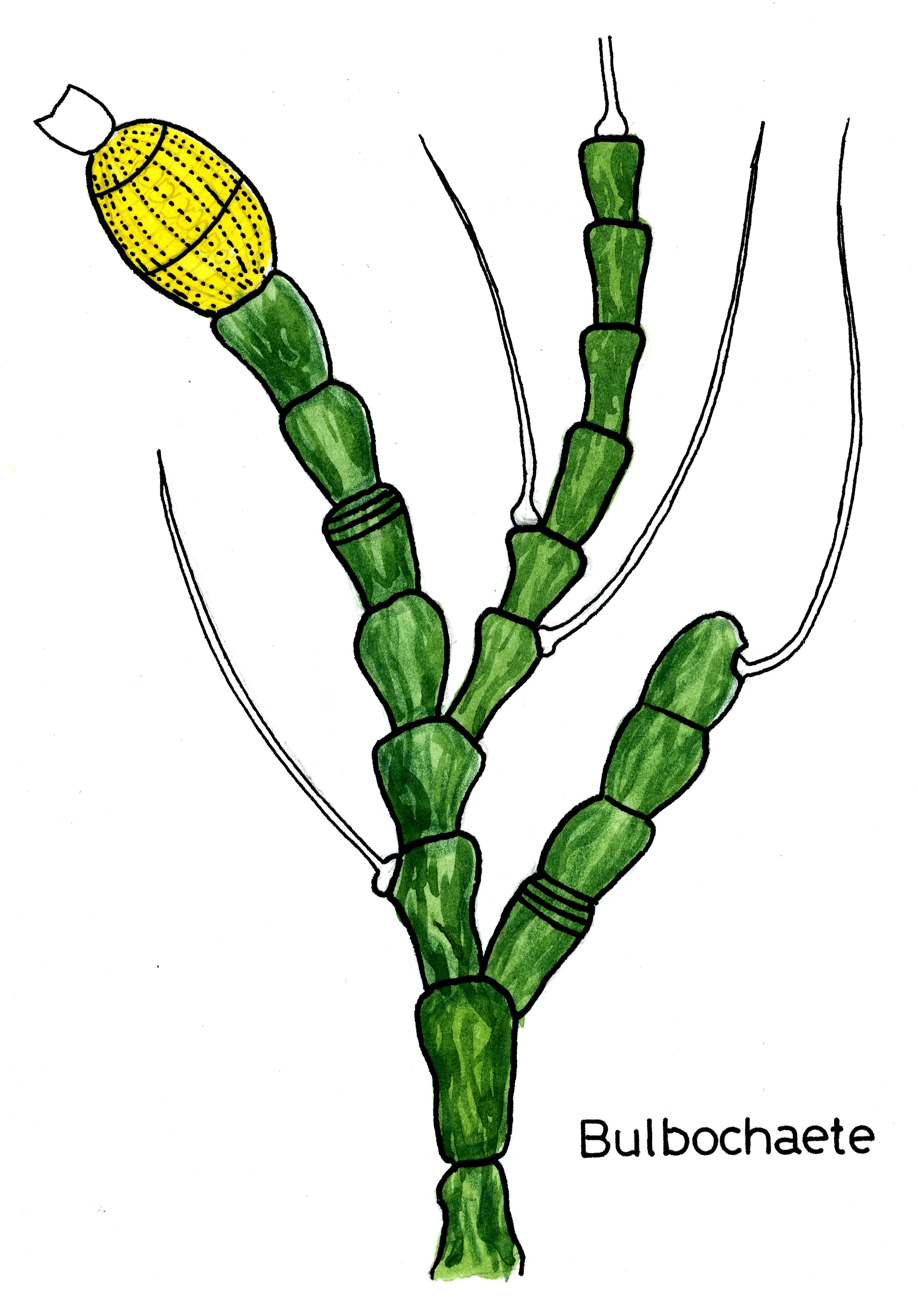
- Bulbochaete

Scientific classification
- Kingdom: Plantae
- Division: Chlorophyta
- Class: Chlorophyceae
- Order: Oedogoniales
- Family: Oedogoniaceae
- Genus: Bulbochaete; C.Agardh, 1817

Type species
- Bulbochaete setigera C.Agardh, 1817

= Bulbochaete =

Genus of algae

Bulbochaete is a genus of algae belonging to the family Oedogoniaceae. The genus has a cosmopolitan distribution and is found primarily in freshwater habitats, occasionally in brackish waters.

The name Bulbochaete refers to its hairs, which are swollen at the base.

== Description ==
Bulbochaete consists of branched, uniseriate (one cell wide) filaments of cells, which are attached to a substrate. Cells of the filaments are wider at the apex than the base, and many cells have a long, colorless bristle which is swollen at the base. Each cell contains a parietal, net-like chloroplast with several pyrenoids.

The cell wall is made of cellulose and is very rigid, and is covered with pectose and a chitin-like substance. In a few species, the cell wall is covered with minute granules.

Some cells have apical caps, which are formed during vegetative cell division. After the nucleus divides, the inner cell wall develops a ring-like thickening near the apex of the cell. The old cell wall is torn apart, and the outer layer of the ring becomes the new cell wall. As the new cross wall is formed, the upper part of the old cell wall becomes an apical cap.

== Life cycle ==
Bulbochaete reproduces asexually and sexually. In asexual reproduction, entire vegetative cells develop into zoospores. Zoospores exit out of the mother cell wall through an opening near the apex, or the junction between the cell and its apical hair. Once free-swimming, zoospores become roughly spherical or ovoid in shape. Zoospores bear an apical ring of flagella, which they use to swim around. As the zoospore settles onto a surface, the flagella gradually retract, and the zoospore germinates into new individual.

Sexual reproduction in Bulbochaete occurs from spring to summer. Bulbochaete species may be monoecious or dioecious. In some species, the male gametangia are borne on normal filaments (macrandrous species), but in other species the male gametangia are borne to one- or few-celled filaments known as dwarf males (nannandrous species).

== Ecology ==
Bulbochaete is generally found in fresh water, occasionally in brackish waters. It tolerates a wide range of pH and nutrient levels. It typically grows attached to aquatic plants or rocks at the edges of ponds, lakes, and other bodies of water.

== Species ==
Bulbochaete contains about 100 species. Identification of Bulbochaete species is difficult, and requires fertile material.

Species include:

- Bulbochaete alabamensis Transeau & Brown In Tiff., 1928
- Bulbochaete allorgei Gauth.-Lièvre
- Bulbochaete angulosa Wittr. & P.Lundell ex Hirn

== See also ==
- Oedogonium
