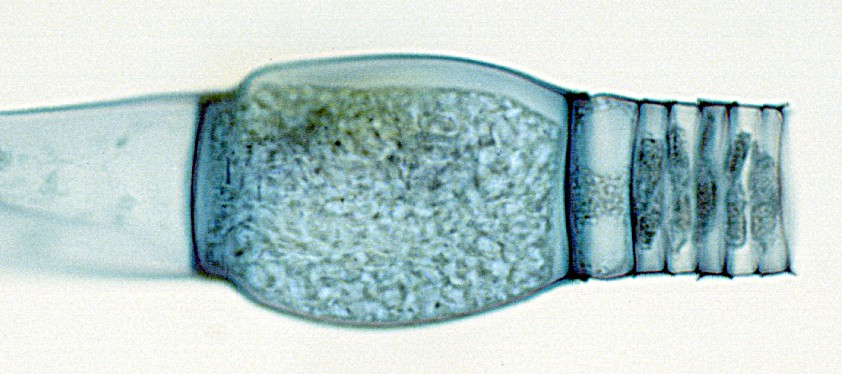
- Oedogonium sp., showing an oogonium (swollen cell) and antheridia (short stacked cells)

Scientific classification
- Domain: Eukaryota
- Clade: Archaeplastida
- Clade: Viridiplantae
- Division: Chlorophyta
- Class: Chlorophyceae
- Order: Oedogoniales
- Family: Oedogoniaceae
- Genus: Oedogonium; Link ex Hirn, 1900

Type species
- Oedogonium grande Kützing ex Hirn

Species
- see text

= Oedogonium =

Genus of algae

Oedogonium is a genus of filamentous, free-living green algae. It was first described in 1820 by Johann Heinrich Friedrich Link, and later given its name by German scientist K. E. Hirn.

The morphology of Oedogonium is unique, with an interior and exterior that function differently from one another and change throughout its life cycle. These algae reside in freshwater ecosystems in both hemispheres and are both benthic and planktonic in nature. They form algal patches on the water's surface and so interact closely with a multitude of other algae. These filamentous cells' life cycles include both sexual and asexual reproduction, depending on the life cycle stage.

Although quite common, Oedogonium is difficult to identify to species since key definitive markers are only present during reproduction, which is an uncommon life stage among this genus. Oedogonium has been found to be important in the fixation of heavy metals in freshwater ecosystems.

== Etymology ==
First named Oedogoniaceen (in German), the name Oedogoniales is derived from the Latin oedos (meaning swelling or tumor) and gonos (meaning offspring or seed). This name describes the morphology that Hirn witnessed during Oedogonium sexual and asexual reproduction and later described in his publication, “Monographie und iconographie der Oedogoniaceen."

== Discovery ==
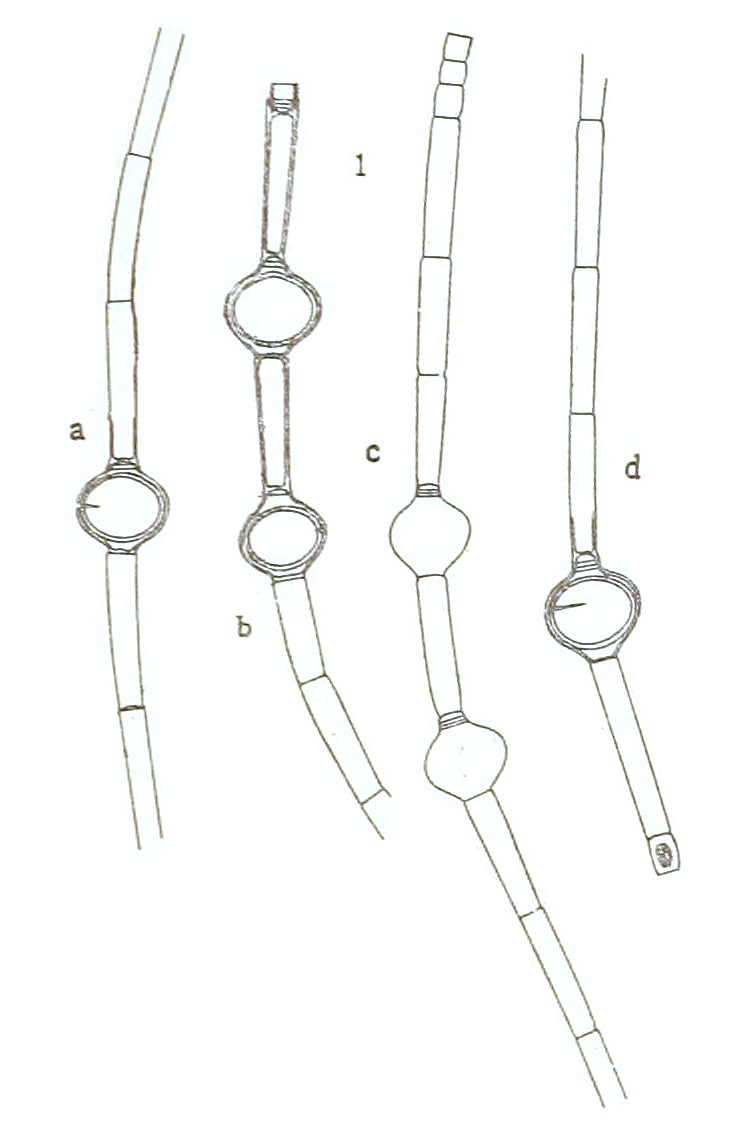
Oedogonium cryptoporum Wittrock ex Hirn, 1900

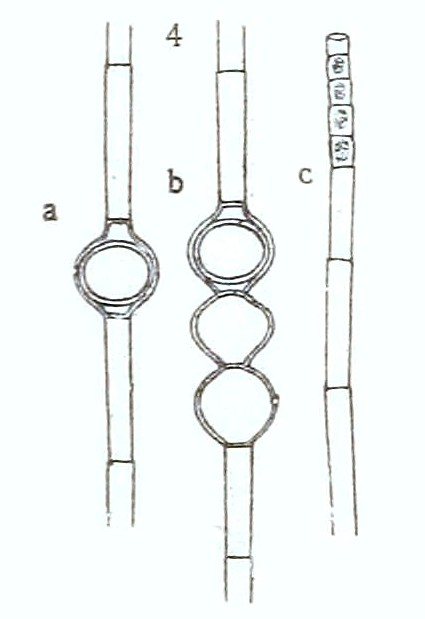
Oedegonium rufescens Wittrock ex Hirn, 1900

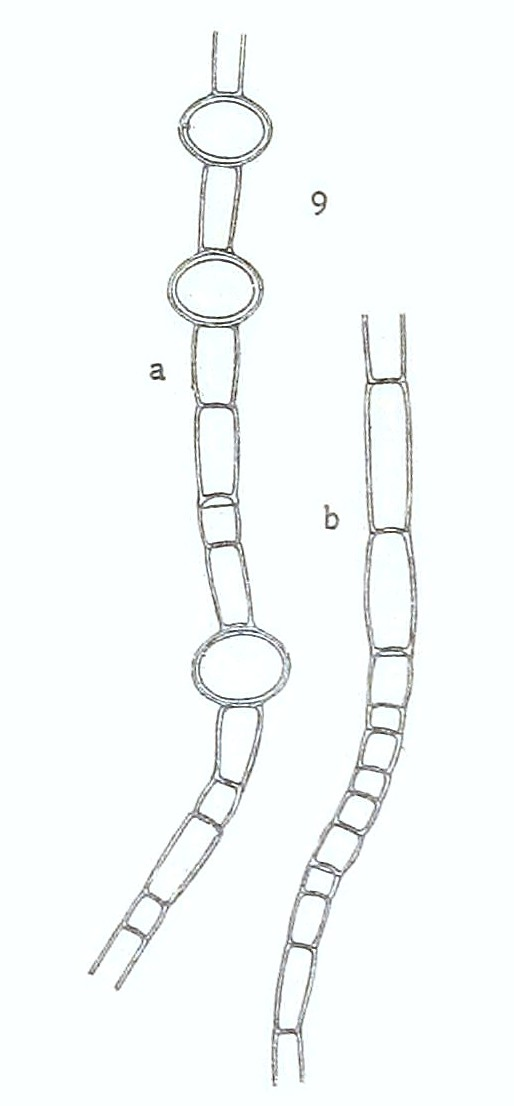
Oedogonium calcareum Ripart, 1876

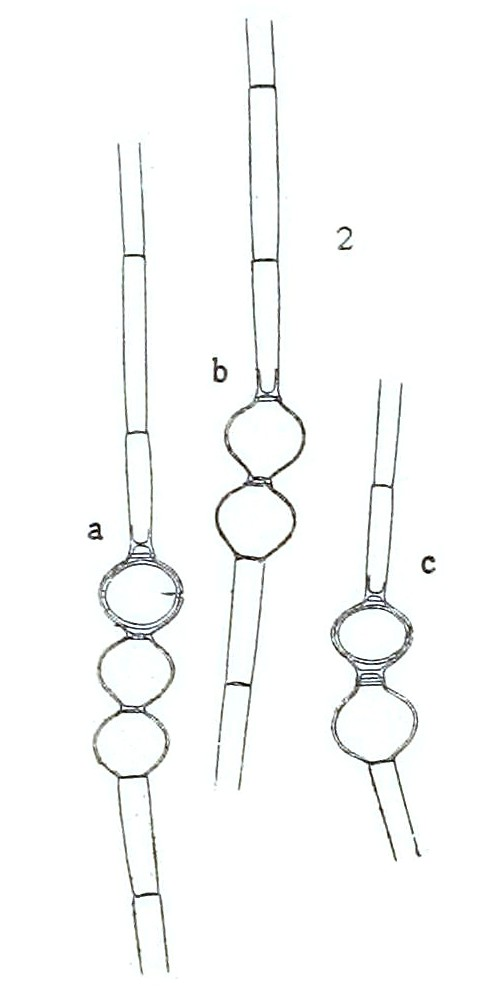
Oedogonium cryptoporum var. vulgare Hirn, 1900

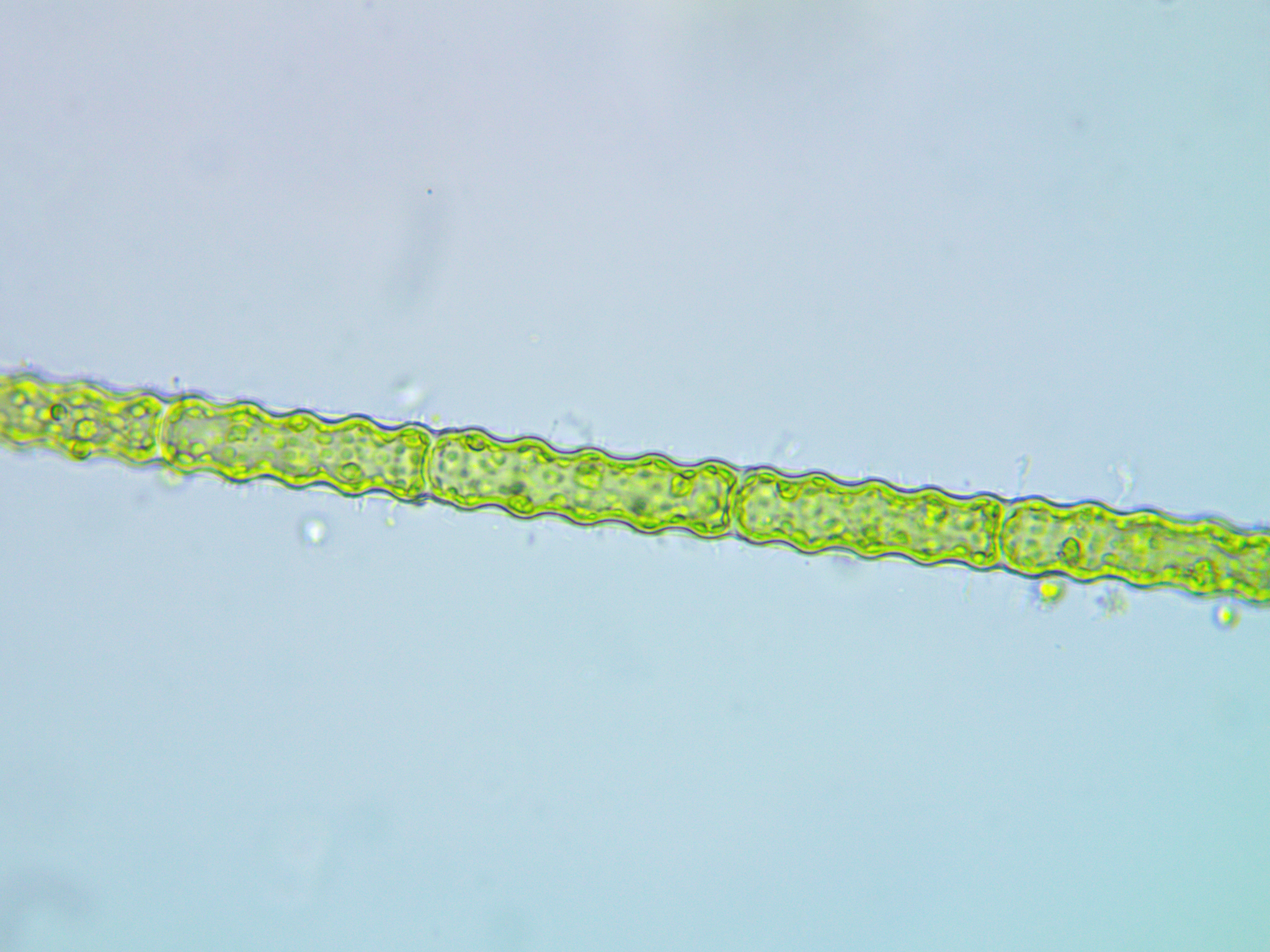
Oedogonium undulatum A.Braun ex. Hirn, 1900

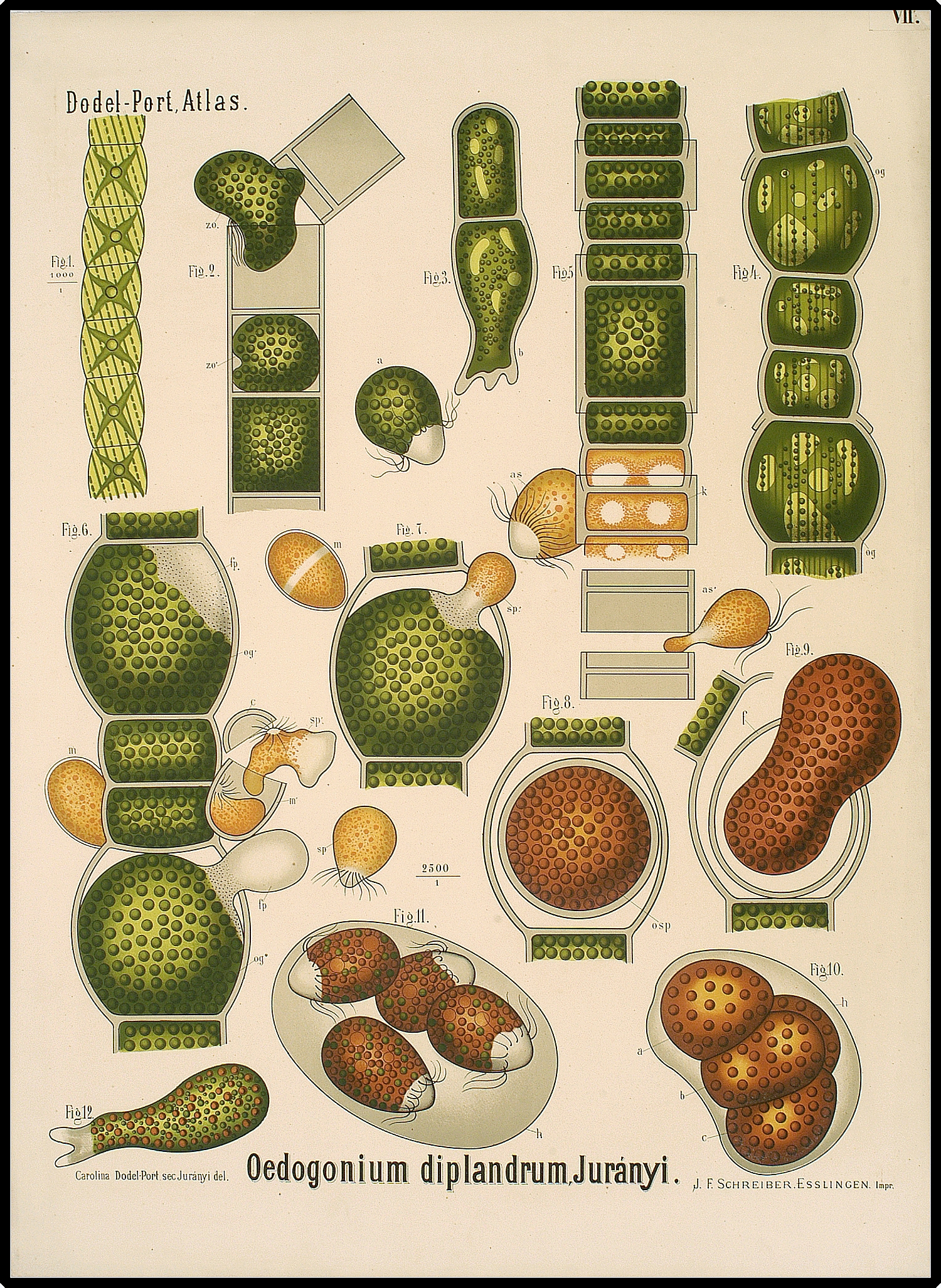
Oedogonium diplandrum, 19th century illustration

Oedogonium species were first reported in the late 19th century by Hilse (1860), Gołowin (1964), Kirchner (1878), Kozłowski (1895) and Gutwiński (1897). Mrozińska was the first to examine the genus in terms of morphology, ecology and distribution and described more than 400 species, mainly from southern Poland.

In 1900, Hirn wrote a monograph concerning his finding of a new taxon, to which he gave the name Oedogoniaceen. Hirn's monograph now serves as the starting point of nomenclature for the family Oedogoniaceae, an exception to Linnaeus' Species plantarum as a starting point for other algae.

In 1991, a paper by Mrozińska presented a new taxonomic classification of the genus Oedogonium, and a proposed division into two sections: I. Monospermatozoideae and II. Dispermatozoideae. These sections were based on the different number of spermatozoids the antheridial (male sex organ containing) cell expresses. This classification is not widely accepted.

== Morphology ==
=== Exterior ===
Cells of the genus Oedogonium are narrow and cylindrical in shape. The algal body consists of green, un-branched, multi-cellular filaments, arranged end to end. Every cell of the filamentous algal body (called the thallus) is similar in shape apart from the apical cell (the uppermost) and the holdfast cell (the lowermost). The apical cell is wider and rounded at its tip relative to the other cells of the thallus. The holdfast cell produces elongated growths from both unattached sides which aid in firmly attaching the filament to a substrate. The holdfast is also the only colorless cell of the filament.

All other cells in the filament exist as green structures very similar in nature, with only some cells having caps. The number of caps per cell illustrates the number of times that cell has divided. Every cell of the filament has a cell wall consisting of three layers – the innermost is made of cellulose, the middle of pectose, and the outermost is made of chitin, all three of which provide rigidity and protection. Most cells are attached to the substrate by the holdfast and are vegetative cells, although some are free-floating.

Species of Oedogonium are divided into two major groups based on distribution of the sex organs: macrandous and nannandrous species. Macrandous species have a male sex organ (the antheridia) and female sex organ (the oogonia) produced on filaments of normal size. This group is further subdivided into macrandous monoecious and macrandous dioecious. In macrandous monoecious species, the antheridia and oogonia are always found on the same filament. In macrandous dioecious species, the antheridia and oogonia are produced on different filaments. Although filaments bearing antheridia and oogonia are morphologically similar, they differ physiologically. In nannandrous species, filaments producing antheridia and oogonia show morphological distinction. The antheridia, which are much smaller than the oogonia, are called dwarf males. Nannandrous species are always dioecious, i.e., antheridia and oogonia are always produced on different filaments. Small male filaments are likely to be attached to a female filament, near an oogonium.

=== Interior ===
The protoplasm of Oedogonium is contained by a plasma membrane, and consists of a single nucleus, reticulate chloroplasts, cytoplasm and a central vacuole. Cell sap (contained by the central vacuole) is made up of inorganic compounds, excretions and secretions. Between the innermost cell wall and the central vacuole is a thin layer known as the protoplast. The single nucleus is large, oval shaped, and sits in the centre of the cell, usually touching the membrane and internal to the chloroplast. This large nucleus contains 1-2 nucleoli and elongated chromosomes. The reticulate, parietal chloroplast extends over the whole interior of the cell, enveloping the protoplast. Whether these networked strands are narrow or broad varies between species, but with most species these reticula are parallel to the long axis of the cell. At the strand junctions are pyrenoids, covered in starch plates. Cells of Oedogonium also contain Golgi bodies, mitochondria, and endoplasmic reticulum.

== Habitat and ecology ==
Oedogonium resides in freshwater ecosystems and prefers stagnant waters, such as small ponds, pools, roadside ditches, marshes, lakes, and reservoirs. It grows over a large pH range (7.3-9.6) and displays a wide tolerance to variation in nutrient type and amount in water. Cells are either fastened to substrate at the bottom of the water system, or free-floating within. When free-floating they form polyalgal patches (mats) on the water's surface to establish a relatively static habitat, created by interweaving multiple different algal filaments suspended in a gelatinous matrix. This matrix is a result of secretions by free floating thalli.

Oedogonium filaments typically appear during the warmer months, appearing at the end of June (northern hemisphere), and throughout July and August are found prevalent in polyalgal mats. Mats formed by Oedogonium are multi-species, associated with Spirogyra, Rhizoclonium, and Cladophora. Together these species use holdfast cells to grip one another in order to photosynthesize, forming an algal bloom.

== Life cycle ==
=== Asexual reproduction ===
Oedogonium can reproduce asexually by fragmentation of their filaments, germination of aplanospores and akinetes, and through zoospores. In fragmentation, the filament splits apart and each fragment reproduces to form a fully functioning thallus. Splitting can occur more than once at the same position of the filament. The splitting of fragmentation may or may not be intentional – it can occur due to natural damage by the environment or predators.

Asexual reproduction via zoospore is also very common and occurs in vegetative (benthic) cells. Vegetative cells produce zoosporangia – the enclosure in which spores are formed – which give rise to the zoospores. Each zoospore has a small hyaline anterior region, and at the base of this region is a ring of flagella (~150). Once emerged from the zoosporangium, a zoospore is still enveloped by a fragile vesicle, from which it is soon discharged. Following dispersal, the zoospore experiences a short period of motility in which it searches for a substrate. When attached to a substrate, the ring of flagella is lost, and the zoospore begins dividing to form a new filament.

Germination of aplanospores and akinetes is uncommon but possible. An aplanospore is non-motile and formed within a vegetative cell, the wall of which is distinct from that of the parent cell. Under certain unfavorable conditions, aplanospores will secrete thick walls around them and store abundant food reserves. An akinete spore is large, non-motile, and thick walled, the wall of which is fused to that of the parent cell. Akinetes thick cell walls are enriched in food materials. Both aplanospores and akinetes are able to withstand unfavorable habitual conditions (cold, winter months or nutrient poor waters) and remain dormant under these conditions. With the onset of favorable conditions (such as warm winter months), they can germinate to form a new individual.

=== Sexual reproduction ===
Sexual reproduction in Oedogonium is oogamous; and can be monoecious or dioecious. Species may either be macrandrous (lacking dwarf males) or nannandrous (possessing dwarf males). Dwarf males are small, short, antheridium-producing filaments attached near the oogonia (female sex organ). These dwarf males are derived from repeated cell division of multi-flagellate androspores. When an oogonial mother cell divides, it forms a swollen oogonium bound by a supporting cell. Oogonial cells may exist in a series along the filament, and so division may also occur in a series; resulting in each oogonium containing a single egg. Production of an egg causes swelling of the cell wall.

Antheridia are short and disk-shaped, containing 1 to 2 multi-flagellated sperm cells. Motile male gametes will exit the antheridia and are chemotactically attracted to oogonia. A single sperm cell will pass through a pore opening in the oogonial cell wall, allowing fertilization to occur. Zygotes (oospores) are initially green but will gradually become an orange-red color and develop a thick multi-layered cell wall with species-specific surface adornments. Meiosis occurs in the zygote prior to germination, producing four multi-flagellated cells after germination. Once freed from the oogonium, each daughter cell is only motile for a short period of time. All four cells may eventually attach to a substrate and then divide repeatedly to form new Oedogonium filament.

The life cycle of Oedogonium is haplontic. The egg from the oogonia and the sperm from the antheridia fuse and form a zygote which is diploid (2n). The zygote then undergoes meiosis and reproduces asexually to form the filamentous green alga which is haploid (1n).

== Genome ==
Oedogonium genome size and organization remain largely unstudied within its phylum.

Oedogonium contain chloroplasts with a distinctive genome architecture. This genome is 196,547bp in length, and is the most compact among photosynthetic chlorophytes. It has a nonconforming quadripartite structure, with 17 group I and 4 group II introns – making it intron-rich. It has four long open reading frames (ORFs), containing 99 different conserved genes. Two of these ORFs show high similarities to genes not usually found in cpDNA (chloroplast DNAs). These molecular signatures are evidence for the theory that Oedogonium is the earliest-diverging lineage of the OCC clade.

== Practical relevance ==
Studies from 2007 onwards have revealed that Oedogonium cells have a maximum high heavy metal absorption capacity (qe). The major mechanism of the lead–absorption interaction has been found to be ionic interactions and complex formation between metal cations and ligands contained within the structure of Oedogonium filaments. The biosorption of heavy metal ions by the Oedogoniales occurs in two stages; an initial rapid uptake due to surface adsorption on the three major cell wall components, followed by a subsequent slow uptake due to membrane transport of metal ions to the cytoplasm of the cells. The three cell surfaces of an Oedogonium filamentous cell consist of polysaccharides, proteins and lipids which provide several functional groups capable of binding to heavy metal ions.

Due to their position at the surface of a body of water, algal blooms can block out the sunlight from other organisms and deplete oxygen levels in the water during peak summer months. Each alga included in the bloom is short-lived, and this results in a high concentration of dead organic matter. The decay process consumes dissolved oxygen in the water, resulting in hypoxic conditions. Without enough dissolved oxygen in the water, animals and plants may die off in large numbers. When blooms are in effect, removing these cells has a positive effect on their ecosystem and may be dried and used to effectively absorb harmful heavy metals from other freshwater systems such as industrial wastes. Oedogonium can also significantly clog irrigation canals when their growth on concrete surfaces becomes excessive due to high levels of benthic filaments. Removal of Oedogonium from clogged irrigation canals can also prove to be cost effective as they may once again be dried and used for absorption of heavy metals.

== Species list ==
This is a list of all accepted Oedogonium species:

=== A ===
- Oedogonium abbreviatum (Hirn) Tiffany, 1934
- Oedogonium ackleyae Tiffany
- Oedogonium acmandrium Elfving ex Hirn, 1900
- Oedogonium acrospirum Skuja, 1949
- Oedogonium acrosporum De Bary ex Hirn, 1900
- Oedogonium aculeatum C.-C.Jao, 1979
- Oedogonium acuminatum (Hirn) Tiffany
- Oedogonium acutum (West & G.S.West) Tiffany
- Oedogonium aequale (Hassall) Kützing
- Oedogonium affine Kützing
- Oedogonium affine (Hassall) Kützing
- Oedogonium agrarium H.-Z.Zhu, 1979
- Oedogonium ahlstrandii Wittrock ex Hirn, 1900
- Oedogonium ahmadii Farooq & Faridi
- Oedogonium ahmedabadense Kamat
- Oedogonium alatum (Hassall) Kützing, 1849
- Oedogonium alatum C.-C.Jao, 1979
- Oedogonium albertii Gauthier-Lièvre
- Oedogonium allorgeanum Lacerda
- Oedogonium alpinum Kützing
- Oedogonium alsium Skuja
- Oedogonium alternans Wittrock & P.Lundell ex Hirn, 1900
- Oedogonium amagerense Hallas
- Oedogonium ambiceps (Jao) Tiffany
- Oedogonium americanum Transeau, 1917
- Oedogonium amplius (W.R.Taylor) Tiffany
- Oedogonium amplum Magnus & Wille, 1884
- Oedogonium amurense Skvortzov
- Oedogonium anastomosans C.-C.Jao, 1979
- Oedogonium andinum Tutin
- Oedogonium angustissimum West & G.S.West ex Hirn, 1900
- Oedogonium angustistomum Hoffman, 1967
- Oedogonium annulare Gonzalves & Jain, 1970
- Oedogonium anomalum Hirn, 1900
- Oedogonium antillarum P.L.Crouan & H.M.Crouan
- Oedogonium apiculatum Wolle
- Oedogonium aquaticum Kamat, 1963
- Oedogonium archerianum Cooke
- Oedogonium arcyosporum Nordstedt, 1900
- Oedogonium areolatocostatum C.-C.Jao, 1979
- Oedogonium areolatofaveolatum C.-C.Jao, 1979
- Oedogonium areolatum Lagerheim ex Hirn, 1900
- Oedogonium areolatum (Singh) Mrozinska, 1985
- Oedogonium areoliferum (C.-C.Jao) Tiffany, 1937
- Oedogonium areschougii Wittrock ex Hirn, 1900
- Oedogonium argenteum Hirn, 1900
- Oedogonium armigerum Hirn, 1900
- Oedogonium armoricanum Villeret
- Oedogonium arnoldii Kiselev
- Oedogonium arnoldii Roll
- Oedogonium ashihoense Skvortzov
- Oedogonium ashihoense Skvortzov & Noda
- Oedogonium aster Wittrock ex Hirn, 1900
- Oedogonium aureum (Tilden) Tiffany
- Oedogonium australianum Hirn, 1900
- Oedogonium autumnale Wittrock ex Hirn, 1900
- Oedogonium aveirense Lacerda

=== B ===
- Oedogonium baginiense Mrozinska-Webb, 1976
- Oedogonium bahusiense Nordstedt ex Hirn, 1900
- Oedogonium bancroftii Stephen Skinner & Timothy John Entwisle|Entwisle, 2006
- Oedogonium bathmidosporum Nordstedt
- Oedogonium bayanhaoteense C.-C.Jao, 1979
- Oedogonium bengalense Hirn, 1900
- Oedogonium berolinense Wittrock
- Oedogonium bharatense Gonzalves & Sonnad
- Oedogonium bharuchae Kamat
- Oedogonium biforme Nordstedt ex Hirn, 1900
- Oedogonium bohemicum Hirn, 1900
- Oedogonium bombycinum (Bory) Montagne
- Oedogonium boreale Hirn, 1900
- Oedogonium borgei (Hirn) Tiffany, 1934
- Oedogonium borisianum Wittrock ex Hirn, 1900
- Oedogonium borisii (Lecl.) Kützing
- Oedogonium boscii Wittrock ex Hirn, 1900
- Oedogonium bourrellyanum Villeret, 1951
- Oedogonium boyanum Claassen
- Oedogonium brasilense Borge ex Hirn, 1900
- Oedogonium braunii Kützing ex Hirn, 1900
- Oedogonium breve C.-C.Jao, 1979
- Oedogonium brevicingulatum C.-C.Jao, 1935
- Oedogonium brevifilum C.-C.Jao, 1979
- Oedogonium brittonii Tiffany, 1936
- Oedogonium broterianum Lacerda, 1945
- Oedogonium brunelii Gonzalves & Jain

=== C ===
- Oedogonium caespitosum P.L.Crouan & H.M.Crouan
- Oedogonium calcareum Cleve & Wittrock, 1900
- Oedogonium calcareum Ripart, 1876
- Oedogonium calliosporum C.-C.Jao, 1979
- Oedogonium calosporum Hirn
- Oedogonium calosporum C.C.Jao, 1936
- Oedogonium calvum Wittrock ex Hirn, 1900
- Oedogonium calyptratum C.-C.Jao, 1979
- Oedogonium canadense (Tiffany) Tiffany
- Oedogonium candollei Kützing
- Oedogonium cantonense S.-H.Ley, 1949
- Oedogonium capense Nordstedt & Hirn, 1900
- Oedogonium capillaceum Kützing
- Oedogonium capillare Kützing ex Hirn, 1900
- Oedogonium capilliforme Kützing ex Hirn, 1900
- Oedogonium capitellatum Wittrock ex Hirn, 1900
- Oedogonium capricornicum Stephen Skinner & Timothy John Entwisle|Entwisle, 2006
- Oedogonium carbonicum Wittrock
- Oedogonium cardiacum Wittrock ex Hirn, 1900
- Oedogonium caricosum C.-C.Jao, 1979
- Oedogonium carinatum C.-C.Jao, 1979
- Oedogonium carolinianum Tiffany
- Oedogonium catenatum H.-Z.Zhu, 1964
- Oedogonium catenulatum Kützing
- Oedogonium catenulum Kützing
- Oedogonium cearense Tiffany, 1937
- Oedogonium cerasinum Stephen Skinner & Entwisle, 2006
- Oedogonium chapmanii Tiffany
- Oedogonium charkoviense Arnoldi & Y.V.Roll, 1939
- Oedogonium chengkiangense C.-C.Jao, 1979
- Oedogonium chowdarii J.P.Keshri, 2012
- Oedogonium chungkingense (C.-C.Jao) C.-C.Jao, 1936
- Oedogonium ciliare de Notaris
- Oedogonium ciliatum Pringsheim ex Hirn, 1900
- Oedogonium circinatum Tiffany
- Oedogonium circumlineatum M.E.Britton
- Oedogonium circumplicatum Margalef
- Oedogonium citriforme Hallas
- Oedogonium clavatum Hallas, 1905
- Oedogonium cleveanum Wittrock ex Hirn, 1900
- Oedogonium cloverae Lillick
- Oedogonium collinsii Tiffany
- Oedogonium columbianum (G.West) Tiffany
- Oedogonium commune (Hirn) Tiffany
- Oedogonium completum (Hirn) Tiffany
- Oedogonium compressum (Hassall) Kützing
- Oedogonium concatenatum Wittrock ex Hirn, 1900
- Oedogonium confertum Hirn, 1900
- Oedogonium conflectum C.-C.Jao, 1979
- Oedogonium congolense Gauthier-Lièvre, 1964
- Oedogonium consociatum Collins & Hervey, 1917
- Oedogonium constrictum C.-C.Jao, 1976
- Oedogonium contortum Hallas, 1905
- Oedogonium corrugatum C.-C.Jao, 1979
- Oedogonium costatosporum C.-C.Jao, 1934
- Oedogonium costatum Transeau, 1930
- Oedogonium costulatum C.-C.Jao, 1979
- Oedogonium crassidens C.-C.Jao, 1936
- Oedogonium crassiusculum Wittrock ex Hirn, 1900
- Oedogonium crassum Wittrock ex Hirn, 1900
- Oedogonium crenulatocostatum Wittrock ex Hirn, 1900
- Oedogonium crenulatum Wittrock ex Hirn, 1900
- Oedogonium cribbianum Stephen Skinner & Entwisle, 2006
- Oedogonium crispulum Wittrock & Nordstedt
- Oedogonium crispum Wittrock ex Hirn, 1900
- Oedogonium croasdalea C.C.Jao
- Oedogonium croasdaleae C.C.Jao
- Oedogonium croceum C.-C.Jao, 1979
- Oedogonium cryptoporum Wittrock ex Hirn, 1900
- Oedogonium curtum Wittrock & P.Lundell ex Hirn, 1900
- Oedogonium curvum Pringsheim ex Hirn, 1900
- Oedogonium cuspidatum Kützing
- Oedogonium cuvieri (Le Clerc) Kützing
- Oedogonium cyathigerum Wittrock ex Hirn, 1900
- Oedogonium cyclostomum Gauthier-Lièvre, 1964
- Oedogonium cylindricum C.-C.Jao, 1942
- Oedogonium cylindrosporum C.-C.Jao, 1979
- Oedogonium cymatosporum Wittrock & Norstedt, 1900

=== D ===
- Oedogonium dacchense Islam & Sarma, 1963
- Oedogonium danicum Hallas, 1905
- Oedogonium dawsonii Prescott, 1957
- Oedogonium debaryanum Chmielevsky
- Oedogonium decaryi Gauthier-Lièvre
- Oedogonium decipiens Wittrock ex Hirn, 1900
- Oedogonium delacerdanum Villeret, 1951
- Oedogonium delicatulum Kützing
- Oedogonium demaretianum Compère, 1976
- Oedogonium densioculum C.-C.Jao, 1979
- Oedogonium densum C.-C.Jao, 1979
- Oedogonium dentireticulatum C.-C.Jao, 1936
- Oedogonium dentireticulosporum Gonzalves & Jain
- Oedogonium depressum Pringsheim ex Hirn, 1900
- Oedogonium desikacharyi Khan & Kukreti
- Oedogonium desikacharyi Gonzalves & Jain
- Oedogonium detonii González Guerrero
- Oedogonium de-tonii P.González, 1964
- Oedogonium dictyosporum Wittrock ex Hirn, 1900
- Oedogonium didymosporum Montagne
- Oedogonium didymum Novis
- Oedogonium dimorphum C.-C.Jao, 1979
- Oedogonium dioicum H.J.Carter ex Hirn, 1900
- Oedogonium dioicum Pétrovsky
- Oedogonium diplandrum Jurányi
- Oedogonium discretum Tiffany, 1951
- Oedogonium dissimile C.-C.Jao, 1979
- Oedogonium diversum (Hirn) Tiffany
- Oedogonium doliiforme C.-C.Jao, 1979
- Oedogonium donnellii Wolle ex Hirn, 1900
- Oedogonium drouetii Tiffany
- Oedogonium dubium Kützing
- Oedogonium dubium (Hassall) Kützing
- Oedogonium dungchwanense C.-C.Jao, 1979

=== E ===
- Oedogonium echinatum Wittrock ex Hirn, 1900
- Oedogonium echinatum H.C.Wood
- Oedogonium echinospermum A.Braun ex Hirn, 1900
- Oedogonium echinospirale Lacerda, 1946
- Oedogonium echinosporum A.Braun
- Oedogonium elegans Kützing, 1849
- Oedogonium elegans West & G.S.West, 1902
- Oedogonium elegans Skvortzov, 1946
- Oedogonium ellipsoideum R.N.Singh
- Oedogonium ellipsosporum R.N.Singh, 1938
- Oedogonium eminens (Hirn) Tiffany, 1934
- Oedogonium epiphyticum Transeau & Tiffany, 1934
- Oedogonium epiphyticum Skvortzov
- Oedogonium epiphyticum Skvortzov & Noda
- Oedogonium erceense Villeret
- Oedogonium eremitum Hallas
- Oedogonium eriense Tiffany, 1936
- Oedogonium erythrospermum Montagne
- Oedogonium estarrejae Lacerda
- Oedogonium euganeorum Wittrock
- Oedogonium excavatum C.-C.Jao, 1934
- Oedogonium excentriporum (C.-C.Jao) Tiffany, 1937
- Oedogonium excisum Wittrock & P.Lundell ex Hirn, 1900
- Oedogonium excitans H.Szymanska
- Oedogonium exiguum Elfving
- Oedogonium exile Ley
- Oedogonium exmonile Tiffany
- Oedogonium exocostatum Tiffany, 1921
- Oedogonium exospirale Tiffany, 1924
- Oedogonium exostriatum Tiffany
- Oedogonium exoticum (Hirn) Tiffany

=== F ===
- Oedogonium fabulosum Hirn, 1900
- Oedogonium fallax Skvortzov
- Oedogonium fallax Skvortzov & Noda
- Oedogonium fanii C.-C.Jao, 1938
- Oedogonium fasciatum (Hassall) Kützing, 1849
- Oedogonium fasciculare P.L.Crouan & H.M.Crouan
- Oedogonium fasciculum H.-Z.Zhu, 1964
- Oedogonium fecundum C.-C.Jao, 1979
- Oedogonium fennicum (Tiffany) Tiffany
- Oedogonium figueirense Lacerda
- Oedogonium figuratum Tiffany, 1936
- Oedogonium fioniae Hallas
- Oedogonium flavescens Wittrock ex Hirn, 1900
- Oedogonium flexuosum Hirn, 1900
- Oedogonium fluitans P.L.Crouan & H.M.Crouan
- Oedogonium fonticola A.Braun ex Hirn, 1900
- Oedogonium fontinale
- Oedogonium formosum Kamat
- Oedogonium fossum Skvortzov & Noda
- Oedogonium foveolatum Wittrock ex Hirn, 1900
- Oedogonium fragile Wittrock ex Hirn, 1900
- Oedogonium franconicum O.Bock & W.Bock, 1954
- Oedogonium frankilianum
- Oedogonium franklinianum Wittrock ex Hirn, 1900
- Oedogonium fremyi Gauthier-Lièvre, 1963
- Oedogonium fructiferum Skvortzov & Noda
- Oedogonium fructum Leiblein
- Oedogonium fugacissimum (Roth) Rabenhorst
- Oedogonium fuscescens (Kützing) Kützing
- Oedogonium fuscolutescens Sprée
- Oedogonium fuscum C.E.Taft
- Oedogonium fusus Hallas, 1905

=== G ===
- Oedogonium gallaecicum Margalef
- Oedogonium gallicum Hirn, 1900
- Oedogonium gelatinosum Kamat
- Oedogonium gemelliparum Pringsheim
- Oedogonium geminatum Kamat
- Oedogonium geniculatum Hirn ex Hirn, 1900
- Oedogonium giganteum Kützing ex Hirn, 1900
- Oedogonium glabrum Hallas, 1905
- Oedogonium glabrum Randhawa, 1936
- Oedogonium globosum Nordstedt ex Hirn, 1900
- Oedogonium goniatum C.-C.Jao, 1979
- Oedogonium gonzalvesiae Islam & P.Sarma
- Oedogonium gonzalvesiae Khan & Kukreti
- Oedogonium gorakhporense R.H.Singh
- Oedogonium gracile Kützing
- Oedogonium gracilius Tiffany, 1934
- Oedogonium gracillimum Wittrock & P.Lundell ex Hirn, 1900
- Oedogonium grande Kützing ex Hirn, 1900
- Oedogonium granulosporum Lacerda
- Oedogonium gujaratense Kamat, 1962
- Oedogonium gunnii Wittrock ex Hirn, 1900

=== H ===
- Oedogonium haimenense C.-C.Jao, 1938
- Oedogonium hallasiae Tiffany
- Oedogonium hanchwanense C.-C.Jao, 1979
- Oedogonium hardyi Stephen Skinner & Entwisle, 2006
- Oedogonium harjedalicum Cedergren
- Oedogonium hatei Kamat, 1963
- Oedogonium heilungkiangense C.-C.Jao, 1979
- Oedogonium heimii Gauthier-Lièvre, 1964
- Oedogonium henriquesii Lacerda
- Oedogonium heterogonium Kützing
- Oedogonium hians Nordstedt & Hirn, 1900
- Oedogonium hindustanense Kamat, 1963
- Oedogonium hirnii Gutwinski ex Hirn, 1900
- Oedogonium hispidum Nordstedt ex Hirn, 1900
- Oedogonium hoehnei Borge, 1925
- Oedogonium hoersholmiense Hallas, 1905
- Oedogonium holsaticum Kützing
- Oedogonium howei Tiffany, 1936
- Oedogonium hsinganicum Skvortzov & Noda
- Oedogonium hsingianicum Skvortzov
- Oedogonium huillense West & G.S.West
- Oedogonium humbertii Gauthier-Lièvre, 1964
- Oedogonium humile C.-C.Jao, 1979
- Oedogonium hunanense C.-C.Jao, 1938
- Oedogonium huntii H.C.Wood ex Hirn, 1900
- Oedogonium hystricinum Transeau & Tiffany, 1919
- Oedogonium hystrix Wittrock ex Hirn, 1900

=== I ===
- Oedogonium ibadanense Gauthier-Lièvre
- Oedogonium idioandrosporum (Nordstedt & Wittrock ex Hirn) Tiffany, 1934
- Oedogonium illinoisense Transeau, 1914
- Oedogonium ilsteri Skuja, 1934
- Oedogonium imahorii Kamat
- Oedogonium implexum Hirn, 1900
- Oedogonium inaequale (Hassall) Kützing
- Oedogonium inaequale H.C.Wood, 1869
- Oedogonium incertum Tiffany
- Oedogonium inclusum Hirn
- Oedogonium inconspicuum Hirn, 1900
- Oedogonium incrassatum Hallas ex Andersen, 1945
- Oedogonium indianense Britton & B.M.Smith, 1935
- Oedogonium indicum Hirn, 1900
- Oedogonium inerme Hirn, 1900
- Oedogonium infimum Tiffany
- Oedogonium infirmum Tiffany, 1924
- Oedogonium inflatum Hallas, 1905
- Oedogonium inframediale C.-C.Jao, 1935
- Oedogonium insigne Hirn, 1900
- Oedogonium intermedium Wittrock ex Hirn, 1900
- Oedogonium inversum Wittrock ex Hirn, 1900
- Oedogonium iowense Tiffany, 1924
- Oedogonium irregulare Wittrock ex Hirn, 1900
- Oedogonium ituriense Gauthier-Lièvre, 1964
- Oedogonium itzigsohnii De Bary ex Hirn, 1900
- Oedogonium iyengarii Gonzalves & Jain

=== J ===
- Oedogonium jaoi Tiffany
- Oedogonium jaoi Mrozinska
- Oedogonium jharkhandense P.Mahato & A.K.Mahato
- Oedogonium jordanovii Vodenicharov

=== K ===
- Oedogonium keralense N.A.Erady & K.Rajappan
- Oedogonium khannae Skuja, 1949
- Oedogonium kiangchwanense C.-C.Jao, 1979
- Oedogonium kiayuanense C.-C.Jao, 1979
- Oedogonium kirchneri Wittrock ex Hirn, 1900
- Oedogonium kirtikarii Kamat, 1963
- Oedogonium kitutae G.S.West, 1907
- Oedogonium kjellmanii Wittrock ex Hirn, 1900
- Oedogonium koechlinii Gauthier-Lièvre, 1964
- Oedogonium kolhapurense Kamat, 1963
- Oedogonium kozminskii Prescott
- Oedogonium kufferathii Gauthier-Lièvre, 1964
- Oedogonium kunmingense H.-Z.Zhu, 1964
- Oedogonium kurzii Zeller ex Hirn, 1900
- Oedogonium kushmiense R.N.Singh
- Oedogonium kwangsiense C.-C.Jao, 1947
- Oedogonium kwangtungense S.-H.Ley, 1949

=== L ===
- Oedogonium lacustre (Hassall) Rabenhorst
- Oedogonium laetevirens P.L.Crouan & H.M.Crouan, 1878
- Oedogonium laetevirens Wittrock ex Hirn, 1900
- Oedogonium laetivirens P.L.Crouan & H.M.Crouan
- Oedogonium laeve Wittrock ex Hirn, 1900
- Oedogonium lageniforme Hirn, 1900
- Oedogonium lagerheimii Wittrock
- Oedogonium lagerstedetii Wittrock ex Hirn, 1900
- Oedogonium lagerstedtii Wittrock ex Hirn, 1900
- Oedogonium landsboroughii Wittrock ex Hirn, 1900
- Oedogonium lanternoides C.-C.Jao, 1979
- Oedogonium laporteanum M.E.Britton
- Oedogonium laschii Rabenhorst
- Oedogonium laticircellum C.-C.Jao, 1979
- Oedogonium latiusculum Tiffany, 1924
- Oedogonium latviense (Tiffany) Tiffany
- Oedogonium lautumniarium
- Oedogonium lautumniarum Wittrock ex Hirn, 1900
- Oedogonium leiopleurum Nordstedt & Hirn, 1900
- Oedogonium leiriense Lacerda
- Oedogonium lemmermannii Tiffany, 1934
- Oedogonium lindmanianum Wittrock ex Hirn, 1900
- Oedogonium lisbonense Lacerda, 1949
- Oedogonium londinense Wittrock ex Hirn, 1900
- Oedogonium longatum Kützing ex Hirn, 1900
- Oedogonium longiarticulatum (Hansgirg) Tiffany
- Oedogonium longicolle Nordstedt ex Hirn, 1900
- Oedogonium longipilum C.-C.Jao, 1937
- Oedogonium longisporum Gauthier-Lièvre, 1964
- Oedogonium longum (Transeau) Tiffany
- Oedogonium lopesianum Lacerda
- Oedogonium lorentzii Wille
- Oedogonium loricatum Hirn ex Hirn, 1900
- Oedogonium louisianense Taft, 1946
- Oedogonium lucens Zanardini
- Oedogonium luisierianum Lacerda, 1958
- Oedogonium lusitanicum Lacerda

=== M ===
- Oedogonium macrandrium Wittrock ex Hirn, 1900
- Oedogonium macrandrum Wittrock
- Oedogonium macrospermum West & G.S.West ex Hirn, 1900
- Oedogonium macrosporum P.L.Crouan & H.M.Crouan
- Oedogonium magnusii Wittrock ex Hirn, 1900
- Oedogonium maharastrense Kamat, 1963
- Oedogonium majus (Hansgirg) Tiffany
- Oedogonium mammiferum Wittrock ex Hirn, 1900
- Oedogonium manschuricum Skvortzov, 1926
- Oedogonium margaritiferum Nordstedt & Hirn, 1900
- Oedogonium marinum Kützing
- Oedogonium martinicense Hirn, 1900
- Oedogonium mattiei Claassen
- Oedogonium matvienkoi Y.V.Roll, 1948
- Oedogonium maximum West & G.S.West, 1901
- Oedogonium mediale Tiffany, 1937
- Oedogonium megaporum
- Oedogonium megasporum Wittrock ex Hirn, 1900
- Oedogonium meneghinianum Kützing
- Oedogonium meridionale Arnoldi & Y.V.Roll, 1939
- Oedogonium mesianum Claassen
- Oedogonium mesoreticulatum J.P.Keshri, 2012
- Oedogonium mesospirale R.N.Singh
- Oedogonium mexicanum Wittrock ex Hirn, 1900
- Oedogonium michiganense Tiffany, 1927
- Oedogonium micraster C.-C.Jao, 1979
- Oedogonium microdictyon C.-C.Jao, 1979
- Oedogonium microgonium Prescott, 1944
- Oedogonium midnapurense J.P.Keshri, 2012
- Oedogonium minisporum Taft, 1939
- Oedogonium minus Wittrock ex Hirn, 1900
- Oedogonium minutum Kützing
- Oedogonium mirabile H.C.Wood, 1869
- Oedogonium mirandrium Skuja, 1927
- Oedogonium mirificum H.-Z.Zhu, 1964
- Oedogonium mirpurense Islam, 1965
- Oedogonium mitratum Hirn, 1900
- Oedogonium moebiusii Skinner & Entwisle, 2006
- Oedogonium monile Berkeley & Harvey ex Hirn, 1900
- Oedogonium moniliforme Wittrock ex Hirn, 1900
- Oedogonium monodii Gauthier-Lièvre, 1964
- Oedogonium montagnei Fiorini-Mazzanti ex Hirn, 1900
- Oedogonium muelleri (Hassall) Kützing
- Oedogonium multiplex Skvortzov
- Oedogonium multiplex Skvortzov & Noda
- Oedogonium multisporum H.C.Wood ex Hirn, 1900
- Oedogonium muratii Gauthier-Lièvre, 1964
- Oedogonium murense Lazar
- Oedogonium mutabile C.-C.Jao, 1979

=== N ===
- Oedogonium nagii Chaudhuri
- Oedogonium nankingense C.-C.Jao, 1937
- Oedogonium nanum Wittrock ex Hirn, 1900
- Oedogonium nebraskense Ohashi, 1926
- Oedogonium neomitratum C.C.Jao
- Oedogonium nigeriense Gauthier-Lièvre, 1964
- Oedogonium nigrum Lacerda, 1946
- Oedogonium nitellae H.-Z.Zhu, 1964
- Oedogonium nitidum C.-C.Jao, 1947
- Oedogonium nobile Wittrock ex Hirn, 1900
- Oedogonium nodosum Kützing
- Oedogonium nodulosum Wittrock ex Hirn, 1900
- Oedogonium nordstedtii Wittrock

=== O ===
- Oedogonium obesum Hirn, 1900
- Oedogonium oblongellum Kirchner, 1900
- Oedogonium oblongum Wittrock ex Hirn, 1900
- Oedogonium obovatum C.-C.Jao, 1979
- Oedogonium oboviforme Wittrock ex Hirn, 1900
- Oedogonium obpyriforme C.-C.Jao, 1979
- Oedogonium obsidionale Cornu
- Oedogonium obsoletum Wittrock ex Hirn, 1900
- Oedogonium obtruncatum Wittrock ex Hirn, 1900
- Oedogonium occidentale (Hirn) Tiffany, 1934
- Oedogonium ocellatum C.-C.Jao, 1979
- Oedogonium ochroleucum (Berk.) Kützing
- Oedogonium octagonum C.-C.Jao, 1979
- Oedogonium oelandicum Wittrock ex Hirn, 1900
- Oedogonium operculatum Tiffany, 1936
- Oedogonium opisthostomum Skuja, 1949
- Oedogonium orientale C.-C.Jao, 1934
- Oedogonium orientale (Skvortzov) Skvortzov
- Oedogonium ornatum Hirn, 1896
- Oedogonium ornatum Arnoldi & Y.V.Roll, 1939
- Oedogonium oryzae Wittrock ex Hirn, 1900
- Oedogonium ouchitanum C.E.Taft, 1935
- Oedogonium ovatum (Hassall) Kützing
- Oedogonium oviforme Hirn, 1900
- Oedogonium ovoidosporum Arnoldi & Y.V.Roll, 1939
- Oedogonium oyei Kamat, 1963

=== P ===
- Oedogonium pachyandrium Wittrock ex Hirn, 1900
- Oedogonium pachydermum Wittrock & P.Lundell ex Hirn, 1900
- Oedogonium pakistanense Islam & P.Sarma, 1963
- Oedogonium palaiense Chacko
- Oedogonium pallidum Kützing
- Oedogonium paloense M.E.Britton, 1948
- Oedogonium paludosum Wittrock ex Hirn, 1900
- Oedogonium pandeyi J.P.Keshri, 2012
- Oedogonium paradoxum C.-C.Jao, 1979
- Oedogonium paraguayense Tiffany
- Oedogonium parasiticum (cag) Rabenhorst
- Oedogonium parreticulatum C.C.Jao
- Oedogonium parthasarathii P.Sarma, D.Mukherjee & A.K.Chakrabarty
- Oedogonium parvulum Kützing
- Oedogonium parvulum Wodenitscharov
- Oedogonium parvum C.-C.Jao, 1936
- Oedogonium patulum Tiffany, 1934
- Oedogonium paucicostdtum
- Oedogonium paucocostatum Transeau, 1914
- Oedogonium paucostriatum Tiffany
- Oedogonium paulense Nordstedt & Hirn, 1900
- Oedogonium peipingense C.-C.Jao, 1935
- Oedogonium perpusillum Skvortzov
- Oedogonium perreticulatum C.-C.Jao, 1979
- Oedogonium perspicuum Hirn, 1900
- Oedogonium petri Wittrock ex Hirn, 1900
- Oedogonium philippinense M.E.Britton, 1948
- Oedogonium pilbaranum Stephen Skinner & Entwisle, 2006
- Oedogonium piliferum Auerswald
- Oedogonium piliferum Wittrock
- Oedogonium pilosporum West ex Hirn, 1900
- Oedogonium pisanum Wittrock ex Hirn, 1900
- Oedogonium pitotianum Gauthier-Lièvre
- Oedogonium placentulum Skvortzov
- Oedogonium placentulum Skvortzov & Noda
- Oedogonium plagiostomum Wittrock ex Hirn, 1900
- Oedogonium plicatulum Wittrock ex Hirn, 1900
- Oedogonium pliciferum C.-C.Jao, 1979
- Oedogonium plurisporum Arnoldi & Roll
- Oedogonium plurisporum Wittrock ex Hirn, 1900
- Oedogonium plusiosporum Wittrock ex Hirn, 1900
- Oedogonium pluviale Nordstedt ex Hirn, 1900
- Oedogonium poecilosporum Nordstedt & Hirn, 1900
- Oedogonium polistandrium H.-Z.Zhu, 1979
- Oedogonium polyandrium Prescott
- Oedogonium polymorphum Wittrock & Lundell
- Oedogonium polyspermum C.-C.Jao, 1979
- Oedogonium porrectum Nordstedt & Hirn, 1900
- Oedogonium praelongum Hallas, 1945
- Oedogonium pratense Transeau, 1914
- Oedogonium praticola Transeau, 1900
- Oedogonium pratinaequalense M.E.Britton
- Oedogonium prescottii Kamat
- Oedogonium princeps Wittrock ex Hirn, 1900
- Oedogonium pringsheimianum Archer
- Oedogonium pringsheimii C.E.Cramer ex Hirn, 1900
- Oedogonium propinquum Wittrock
- Oedogonium psaegmatosporum Nordstedt ex Hirn, 1900
- Oedogonium pseudacrosporum Wittrock, 1900
- Oedogonium pseudareolatum C.-C.Jao, 1979
- Oedogonium pseudaureum C.C.Jao
- Oedogonium pseudoareachougii Gauthier-Lièvre
- Oedogonium pseudoboscii Hirn, 1900
- Oedogonium pseudocleveanum Gauthier-Lièvre, 1964
- Oedogonium pseudodentireticulatum Gauthier-Lièvre
- Oedogonium pseudofragile Claassen
- Oedogonium pseudogunnii C.-C.Jao, 1979
- Oedogonium pseudohirnii C.-C.Jao, 1979
- Oedogonium pseudohowardii C.-C.Jao, 1979
- Oedogonium pseudomitratum A.M.Scott & Prescott, 1958
- Oedogonium pseudomitratum C.-C.Jao, 1979
- Oedogonium pseudopachydermum J.P.Keshri, 2012
- Oedogonium pseudoplenum Tiffany
- Oedogonium pseudorothii C.-C.Jao, 1979
- Oedogonium pseudorugulosun C.-C.Jao, 1938
- Oedogonium pseudospirale Nygaard, 1932
- Oedogonium pseudostarmachii J.P.Keshri, 2012
- Oedogonium pseudosuecicum H.-Z.Zhu, 1979
- Oedogonium pseudotumidulum Gauthier-Lièvre, 1964
- Oedogonium pudicum Tiffany, 1951
- Oedogonium puellae Skvortzov
- Oedogonium pulchellum (Hassall) Kützing
- Oedogonium pulchrum Nordstedt & Hirn, 1900
- Oedogonium pullum Skvortzov & Noda
- Oedogonium punctatostriatum De Bary ex Hirn, 1900
- Oedogonium punctatum Wittrock ex Hirn, 1900
- Oedogonium pungens Hirn, 1900
- Oedogonium pusillum Kirchner ex Hirn, 1900
- Oedogonium pygmaeum Gonzalves & Jain
- Oedogonium pyrisporum Kiselev
- Oedogonium pyrulum Wittrock ex Hirn, 1900

=== Q ===
- Oedogonium quadratum Hallas, 1905
- Oedogonium quezelii Gauthier-Lièvre, 1964
- Oedogonium quintanilhae Lacerda, 1946

=== R ===
- Oedogonium raikwarii Khan & Kukreti
- Oedogonium ralfsii (Hassall) Kützing
- Oedogonium randhawae Venkataraman
- Oedogonium rarissimum Skvortzov
- Oedogonium rarissimum Skvortzov & Noda
- Oedogonium reductum Taft, 1946
- Oedogonium regium E.O.Hughes
- Oedogonium regium Hughes
- Oedogonium reinschii J.Roy ex Hirn, 1900
- Oedogonium repandum C.-C.Jao, 1979
- Oedogonium repens Kamat
- Oedogonium reticulatonervatum C.C.Jao
- Oedogonium reticulatum West & G.S.West, 1902
- Oedogonium reticulocostatum C.-C.Jao
- Oedogonium reticulonervatum C.-C.Jao, 1979
- Oedogonium reticulosporum Mrozinska, 1960
- Oedogonium rhodosporum Wittrock ex Hirn, 1900
- Oedogonium richterianum Nayal
- Oedogonium richterianum Lemmermann ex Hirn, 1900
- Oedogonium rigidum Hirn, 1900
- Oedogonium ringens Hoffman
- Oedogonium ripartii De Toni
- Oedogonium rivulare A.Braun ex Hirn, 1900
- Oedogonium rosenvingii Hallas
- Oedogonium rostellatum Pringsheim
- Oedogonium rothii Pringsheim ex Hirn, 1900
- Oedogonium rufescens Wittrock ex Hirn, 1900
- Oedogonium rugulosum Nordstedt ex Hirn, 1900
- Oedogonium rupestre Hirn, 1900

=== S ===
- Oedogonium salinum C.-C.Jao, 1979
- Oedogonium sanctithomae Wittrock & Cleve ex Hirn, 1900
- Oedogonium santapaui Kamat
- Oedogonium santurcense Tiffany, 1936
- Oedogonium sawyeri Prescott
- Oedogonium saxatile Hansgirg, 1901
- Oedogonium schmidlei Gutwinski ex Hirn, 1900
- Oedogonium schweickerdtii Cholnoky, 1952
- Oedogonium scrobiculatum Wittrock ex Hirn, 1900
- Oedogonium scutatum Kützing
- Oedogonium selandiae Hallas, 1905
- Oedogonium seligeriense Arnoldi & Y.V.Roll, 1939
- Oedogonium semiapertum Nordstedt & Hirn, 1900
- Oedogonium setigerum Wolle
- Oedogonium setigerum Hoffman
- Oedogonium sexangulare Cleve ex Hirn, 1900
- Oedogonium shantungense C.-C.Jao, 1979
- Oedogonium shanxiense Y.J.Ling & S.L.Xie, 1999
- Oedogonium silvaticum Hallas, 1905
- Oedogonium simplex Hirn, 1900
- Oedogonium sinense L.C.Li, 1933
- Oedogonium sinensis
- Oedogonium singhbhumense P.Mahato & A.K.Mahato
- Oedogonium singhii Kamat
- Oedogonium singulare Kamat, 1962
- Oedogonium sinuatum Transeau
- Oedogonium skujae J.P.Keshri, 2012
- Oedogonium smithii Prescott, 1944
- Oedogonium sociale Wittrock ex Hirn, 1900
- Oedogonium sodiroanum Lagerheim ex Hirn, 1900
- Oedogonium sol Hirn, 1900
- Oedogonium soldatovii Skvortzov
- Oedogonium sordidum (Roth) Kützing
- Oedogonium southlandiae Novis
- Oedogonium spachtii Scott & Prescott
- Oedogonium spechtii A.M.Scott & Prescott
- Oedogonium speciosum S.-H.Ley, 1949
- Oedogonium spectabile Hirn, 1900
- Oedogonium spetsbergense Wittrock
- Oedogonium sphaerandrum Wittrock & Lundell ex Hirn, 1900
- Oedogonium sphaericoinconspicuum H.Silva, 1953
- Oedogonium sphaericum (Hassall) Kützing
- Oedogonium sphaerocephalum Gauthier-Lièvre
- Oedogonium sphaeroideum Prescott, 1944
- Oedogonium spheroideum Prescott
- Oedogonium spinospermum Reinsch
- Oedogonium spinosporum Gonzalves & Jain
- Oedogonium spinosum Gonzalves & Sonnad, 1961
- Oedogonium spirale Hirn, 1900
- Oedogonium spiralidens C.-C.Jao, 1934
- Oedogonium spiripennatum C.-C.Jao, 1934
- Oedogonium spirostriatum Tiffany
- Oedogonium spurium Hirn, 1900
- Oedogonium stagnale Kützing
- Oedogonium starmachii Mrozinska, 1958
- Oedogonium stellatum Wittrock ex Hirn, 1900
- Oedogonium stephensiae Tiffany, 1936
- Oedogonium stictospermum (Skuja) Tiffany, 1949
- Oedogonium striatum Randhawa
- Oedogonium subacrosporum Gauthier-Lièvre, 1964
- Oedogonium subareolatum Tiffany, 1936
- Oedogonium subcapitellatum Hirn
- Oedogonium subcymatosporum C.-C.Jao, 1936
- Oedogonium subdentireticulatum C.-C.Jao, 1979
- Oedogonium subdepressum C.-C.Jao, 1937
- Oedogonium subdissimile C.-C.Jao, 1979
- Oedogonium subellipsoideum Tiffany, 1934
- Oedogonium subglobosum (Wittrock) Tiffany
- Oedogonium subglobosum C.E.Taft
- Oedogonium subintermedium Claassen
- Oedogonium sublongicolle C.-C.Jao, 1979
- Oedogonium submoniliforme Mrozinska-Webb, 1976
- Oedogonium suboctangulare West & G.S.West, 1902
- Oedogonium suboelandicum J.P.Keshri, 2012
- Oedogonium subopistostomum J.P.Keshri, 2012
- Oedogonium suborbiculare C.-C.Jao, 1936
- Oedogonium subplagiostomum S.-H.Ley, 1949
- Oedogonium subplenum Tiffany
- Oedogonium subquadratum C.-C.Jao, 1979
- Oedogonium subrectum Hirn, 1900
- Oedogonium subrothii C.-C.Jao, 1979
- Oedogonium subsetacem Kützing
- Oedogonium subsexangulare Tiffany, 1934
- Oedogonium subspirale Mrozinska, 1958
- Oedogonium subspirale Gauthier-Lièvre
- Oedogonium subspiralidens C.-C.Jao, 1979
- Oedogonium subsuperbum J.P.Keshri, 2012
- Oedogonium subtile Skvortzov, 1946
- Oedogonium subtile H.-Z.Zhu, 1964
- Oedogonium subulatum J.P.Keshri, 2012
- Oedogonium subvaucheri Claassen
- Oedogonium sudanense Gauthier-Lièvre, 1964
- Oedogonium suecicum Wittrock ex Hirn, 1900
- Oedogonium superbum C.-C.Jao, 1979
- Oedogonium supremum Tiffany, 1924
- Oedogonium svirencoi Arnoldi & Y.V.Roll, 1939
- Oedogonium szemaoense C.-C.Jao, 1979
- Oedogonium szymanskae Mrozinska, 2000

=== T ===
- Oedogonium taftii Lacerda
- Oedogonium taftii Tiffany
- Oedogonium taliense C.-C.Jao, 1979
- Oedogonium tapeinosporum Wittrock ex Hirn, 1900
- Oedogonium taphrosporum Nordstedt & Hirn, 1900
- Oedogonium taylorii C.-C.Jao, 1934
- Oedogonium tenellum Kützing, 1845
- Oedogonium tenerum C.-C.Jao, 1979
- Oedogonium tentoriale Nordstedt & Hirn, 1900
- Oedogonium tenue Kützing
- Oedogonium tenuissimum Hansgirg ex Hirn, 1900
- Oedogonium terrestre Randhawa, 1939
- Oedogonium texense Taft, 1946
- Oedogonium thanaense Gonzalves & Jain, 1970
- Oedogonium thermale P.L.Crouan & H.M.Crouan
- Oedogonium tibeticum Y.-X.Wei & H.J.Hu, 1984
- Oedogonium tiffanii Ackley, 1929
- Oedogonium tinghushanense C.-C.Jao, 1979
- Oedogonium transeaui Gonzalves & Jain
- Oedogonium transversum Hallas ex Andersen, 1945
- Oedogonium triandronites H.J.Carter
- Oedogonium trichospermum J.Hermann
- Oedogonium trichosporum J.Hermann
- Oedogonium trioicum Woronichin, 1923
- Oedogonium tsingtaoense H.-Z.Zhu, 1964
- Oedogonium tumidulum Wittrock ex Hirn, 1900
- Oedogonium tungarense Gonzalves & Jain
- Oedogonium turfosum (Areschoug) Kützing
- Oedogonium turkestanicum Kiselev
- Oedogonium typhae C.-C.Jao, 1979
- Oedogonium tyrolicum Wittrock ex Hirn, 1900

=== U ===
- Oedogonium uleanum Hirn, 1900
- Oedogonium undulatum A.Braun ex Hirn, 1900
- Oedogonium univerrucosum Obukhova
- Oedogonium upsaliense Wittrock ex Hirn, 1900
- Oedogonium urbicum Wittrock ex Hirn, 1900
- Oedogonium urceolatum Nordstedt & Hirn, 1900
- Oedogonium utrarium Stephen Skinner & Entwisle, 2006

=== V ===
- Oedogonium validum C.-C.Jao, 1979
- Oedogonium vanoyeanum Gauthier-Lièvre, 1964
- Oedogonium variabile Y.V.Roll, 1945
- Oedogonium variabile Hilse, 1863
- Oedogonium variabile Gonzalves & Sonnad, 1962
- Oedogonium varians Wittrock & Lundell ex Hirn, 1900
- Oedogonium vaucheri A.Braun ex Hirn, 1900
- Oedogonium velatum Hallas, 1905
- Oedogonium vernale (Hassall) Wittrock
- Oedogonium verrucosum Hallas, 1905
- Oedogonium vesicatum Wittrock ex Hirn, 1900
- Oedogonium viaticum H.Szymanska & H.Werblan-Jakubiec
- Oedogonium victoriense G.S.West, 1906
- Oedogonium virceburgense Hirn ex Hirn, 1900

=== W ===
- Oedogonium wabashense Tiffany, 1927
- Oedogonium warmingianum Wittrock ex Hirn, 1900
- Oedogonium welwitschii West & G.S.West ex Hirn, 1900
- Oedogonium westii (Tiffany & Brown) Tiffany & Brown
- Oedogonium whitfordii Gonzalves & Jain
- Oedogonium wirceburgense Hirn
- Oedogonium wittrockianum Hirn
- Oedogonium wolleanum Wittrock ex Hirn, 1900
- Oedogonium wyliei Tiffany, 1926

=== Y ===
- Oedogonium yunnanense C.-C.Jao, 1979

=== Z ===
- Oedogonium zehneri (Tiffany) Tiffany, 1934
- Oedogonium zigzag Cleve ex Hirn, 1900
- Oedogonium zmiewicum Arnoldi & Y.V.Roll, 1939
- Oedogonium zonatum (Weber & Mohr) V.Leiblein

== See also ==
- Bulbochaete
