= Otto Elfving =

Finnish politician

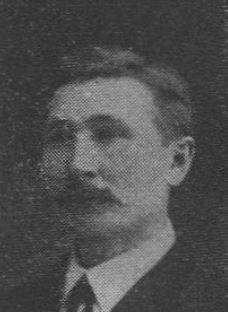

Otto Wilhelm Elfving (12 April 1874 in Turku – 14 October 1944) was a Finnish metal worker and politician. He was a member of the Parliament of Finland from 1919 to 1922 and again from 1926 to 1927, representing the Social Democratic Party of Finland (SDP).
