= William J. Elfving =

American lawyer and judge

Judge of the California Superior Court
- In office November 13, 1997 – 2017
- Appointed by: Pete Wilson

Personal details
- Born: William Johnson Elfving; March 17, 1941 (age 85) San Mateo, California, U.S.
- Education: Stanford University (B.A.); UCLA School of Law (J.D.)

Military service
- Branch/service: United States Army
- Years of service: 1965–1967
- Rank: Captain

William Johnson Elfving (born March 17, 1941) is an American lawyer and former judge of the Superior Court of California, County of Santa Clara. He was appointed to the bench on November 13, 1997, and retired in 2017. Prior to his appointment he was in private practice for 30 years. He is the chair of the Superior Court Arbitration/ADR committee. He is most notable because of his many rulings on specialized areas of intellectual property law.

== Education ==
He earned a Bachelor of Arts from Stanford University in 1962 and a Juris Doctor from the University of California, Los Angeles School of Law in 1965.

== Military service ==
After completing law school, he served as a Captain in the United States Army from 1965 to 1967.

== Legal & Judicial career ==
From 1967 to 1997 he was a shareholder with Hoge, Fenton, Jones & Appel.

He was appointed to the Santa Clara County Superior Court by Governor Pete Wilson on November 13, 1997, and remained there until he retired in 2017.

=== Notable rulings ===
In a 1999–2000 case involving the DVD crack DeCSS, which allows users to evade copyright protections on DVDs allowing them to directly upload content onto their hard disk drive, he first denied the industry's "very broad request" for a temporary restraining order banning websites from the sale or distribution of the program or linking to places where it might be found, but later issued a preliminary injunction barring sites from selling or distributing the program. (See Universal v. Reimerdes.)

On September 21, 2008, he issued a summary judgment finding for Google in a closely watched age discrimination lawsuit, concluding that former director of operations, Brian Reid, had not supplied to the court sufficient evidence supporting the claims that he was fired in February 2004 because of his age. Reid alleged he was fired because he "didn't fit in with the company's youthful culture."

In 2009, he found that Yvonne Wong, a dentist, could continue to sue a couple who posted a negative review on Yelp alleging that "those statements libeled her and caused her emotional distress". In her lawsuit, Wong alleged that Tai Jing and Jia Ma defamed her by complaining on Yelp about the treatment their son received when he was 4 years old; they alleged the boy became lightheaded from laughing gas and had received a filling containing mercury. The ruling was reversed by the California Sixth District Court of Appeals in 2010

== Other activities & post retirement ==
He is a former director of the Santa Clara County Legal Aid Society.

After his retirement from the bench, he worked as an arbitrator and mediator in the JAMS Silicon Valley Resolution Center.
