= Betty Elfving =

Finnish Writer (1837–1923)

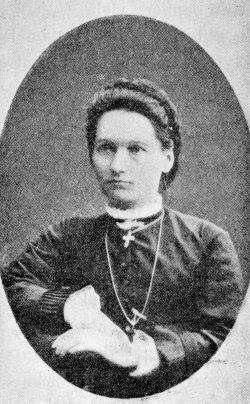
- Born: 16 March 1837 Pori, Grand Duchy of Finland, Russian Empire
- Died: 29 October 1923 (aged 86) Turku, Finland
- Occupation: Writer

Betty Gustafva Lovisa Elfving (16 March 1837 – 29 October 1923) pen name Aura, was a Finnish writer. She is known for her Historical fictions, which once gained popularity especially among young people.

== Personal history ==
Betty Elfving was born in Pori in 1837 to a middle-class family. His father was Professor Johan Fredrik Elfving, who was originally the son of a blacksmith, but then rose to an exceptionally high social rank: professor and district physician. The mother's name was Vendla Elfving (own surname Sucksdorff), and she belonged to a middle-class family.

Betty Elfving's home was Swedish-speaking, but Elfving became an avid lover of the Finnish language at a young age. Nevertheless, she wrote the novels in Swedish, from which they were translated into Finnish. Elfving's works were not published in Swedish at all. Elfving was also interested in History of Finland, which is reflected in his works. Betty Elfving was completely different in her hobby of the Finnish language from her younger brother, botany professor Fredrik Elfving, who was one of Sweden's most enthusiastic supporters. Politically, Betty Elfving was close to Finnish youth circles.

Elfving was a close friend of Emilie Bergbom, who influenced Finnish theatre. They had gotten to know each other in the 1870s at the academy in a group lectured by women and corresponded until Bergbom's death. In his letters to Elfving, Bergbom could vent his worries that he could not talk about with others. Elfving's close relationship with Bergbom is also indicated by the fact that together with Bergbom's brother Kaarlo Bergbom, they made a trip to Stockholm, Copenhagen and Berlin.

== The beginning of a literary career and Härkmann's sons ==
Elfving only started her literary career at the age of 50, and even then under the pseudonym Aura, as it used to be common for women to write, because women's writing was not accepted in the same way as men's. Her first work was Härkmann's sons, a historical war novel about the times of great hatred. The main characters of the work are Miihkali and Yrjö Härkman, the sons of the vicar of Keuruu who swept against Russia, Miihkali's wife Elina and Alli from Karja. Härkman's sons are historically based on real priests' sons Gabriel, Juhana and Kustaa Herpman, who defended their home region against the Russians in 1714–1715.

Miihkal's problem is the choice between military and spiritual activity; eventually he ends up joining the war. Alli, on the other hand, looks for help for her enslaved family among influential men, but is only met with disappointment. A triangular drama is built around Miihkal, Elina and Alli, which calls into question the virtue of Miihkal, who otherwise appears as a hero. Heroism is indeed problematic in Härkmann's sons in a way that is often foreign to other war literature of the time.

== Works ==
- Härkman's sons (Werner Söderström 1887; second edition 1908 as Härkman's sons)
- Pupils of Sprengtporten (unpublished)
- The Legacy of the Centenary, Part 1, Lot Cast – Part 2, Murrosaikana (Werner Söderström 1902; joint work 1914)
