= Runar Collander =

Finnish botanist

- Born: 1 May 1894; Vyborg, Finland
- Died: 25 May 1973 (aged 79); Helsinki, Finland
- Education: University of Helsinki
- Scientific career
- Fields: Botany, Plant physiology
- Workplaces: University of Helsinki

Paul Runar Collander (1 May 1894 Vyborg – 25 May 1973 Helsinki) was a Finnish botanist. He was an adjunct professor of plant physiology at the University of Helsinki from 1935 to 1939, and professor of botany from 1939 to 1961. He gained international acclaim for his research on the effect of molecular size and solubility ratios on the ability of substances to penetrate the cell membrane. He presented the "lipoid filter theory" of permeability and further developed it. Collander also wrote several works on the history of botany.

== Selected works ==
- Collander, Runar (1965). The History of Botany in Finland, 1828–1918. The History of Learning and Science in Finland, 1828–1918. Helsinki: Societas Scientiarum Fennica [Finnish Society of Sciences and Letters]. pp. 1–159.
