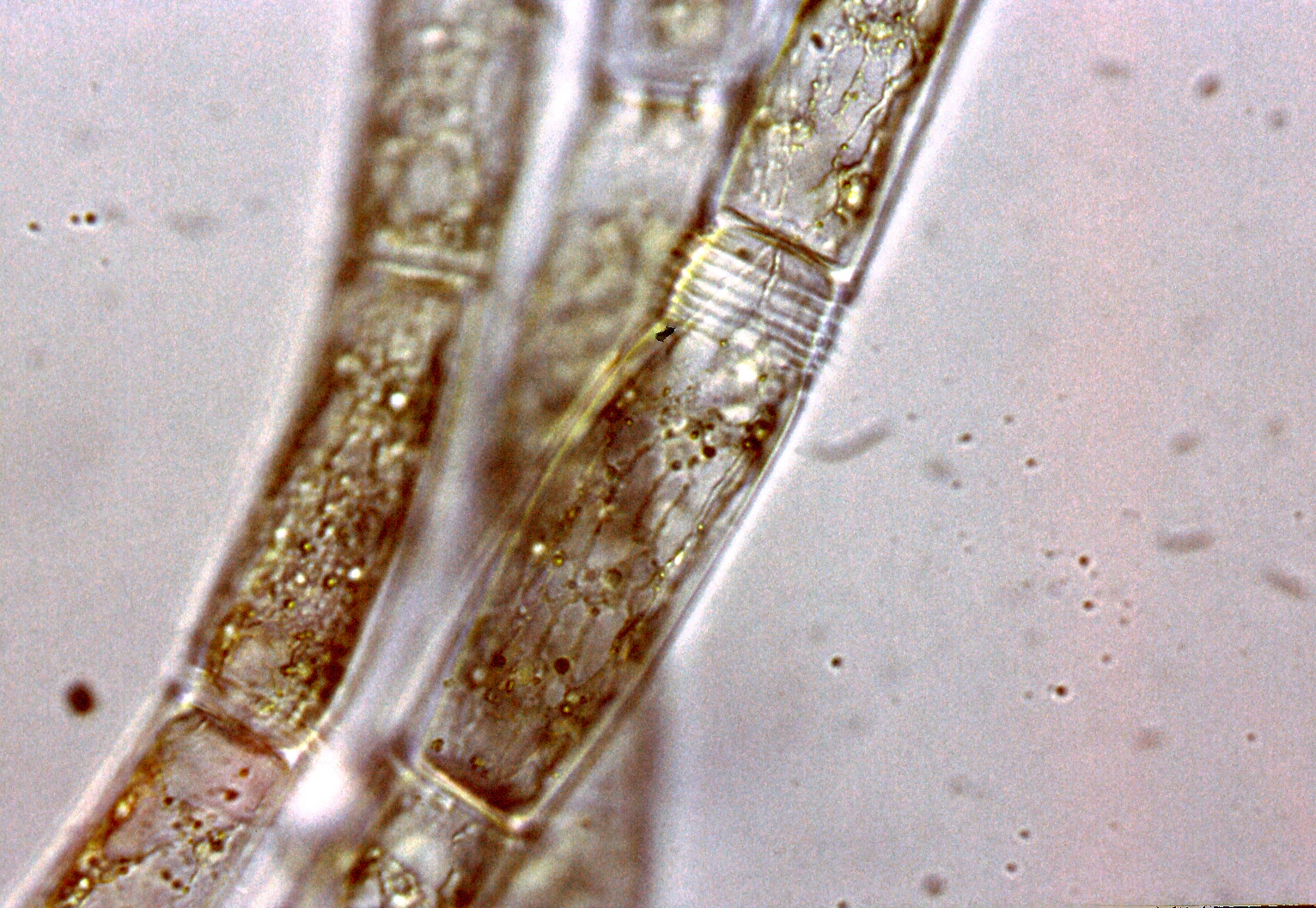

Scientific classification
- Kingdom: Plantae
- Division: Chlorophyta
- Class: Chlorophyceae
- Order: Oedogoniales; Heering
- Family: Oedogoniaceae de Bary ex Hirn

Genera
- Bulbochaete; Oedocladium; Oedogonium; †Paleooedogonium; Pseudoprostratum

= Oedogoniaceae =

Family of algae

The Oedogoniales are an order of filamentous freshwater green algae of the class Chlorophyceae. The order is well-defined and has several unique features, including asexual reproduction with zoospores that possess stephanokont flagella: numerous short flagella arranged in a subapical whorl. The Oedogoniales have a highly specialized type of oogamy, and an elaborate method of cell division which results in the accumulation of apical caps.

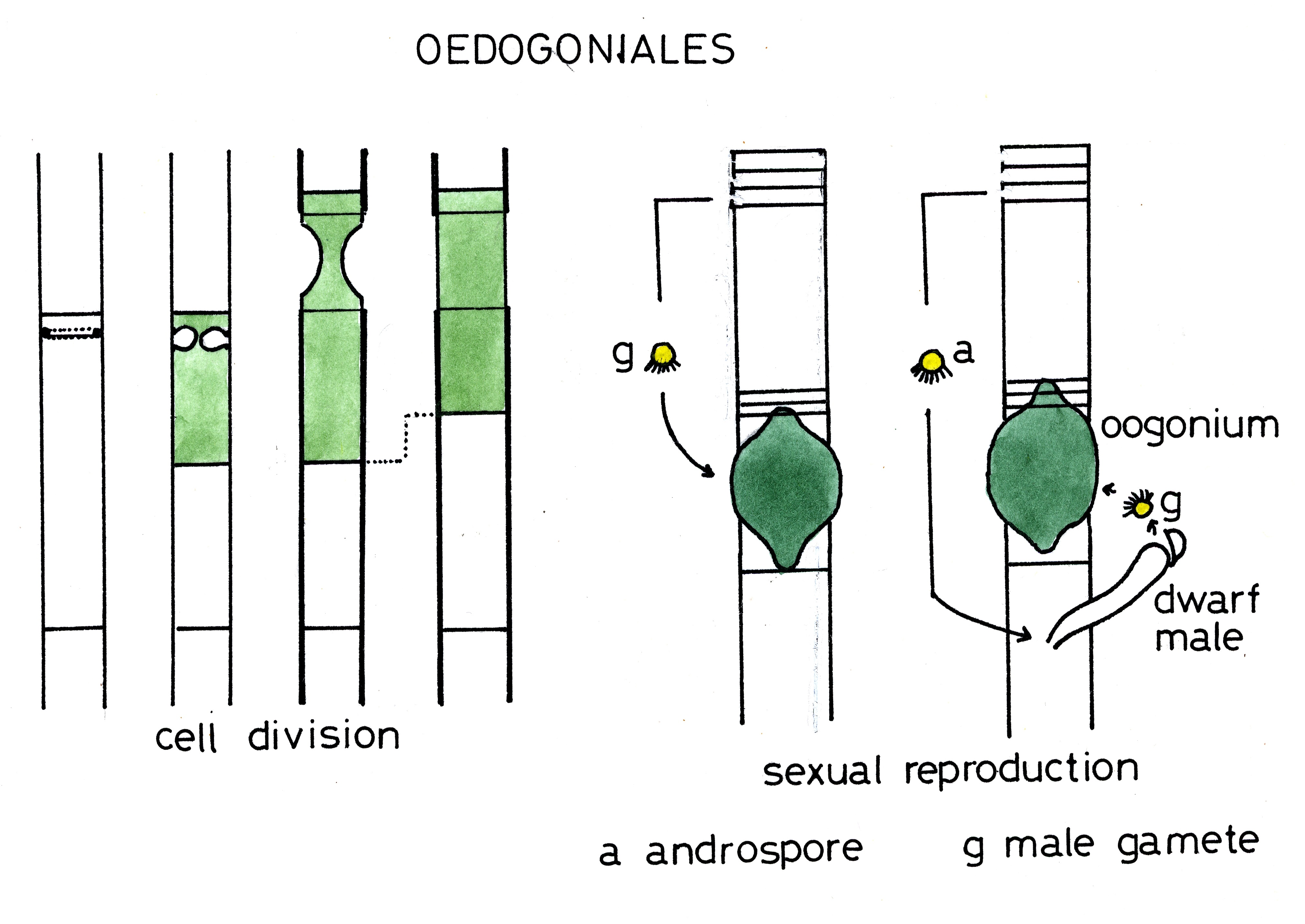
Oedogoniales: cell division and sexual reproduction

The order comprises one family, Oedogoniaceae, with four extant genera and one fossil genus. Some common features among these genera may be obscure. The hairs of Bulbochaete and the heterotrichous system Oedocladium are similar to Chaetophorales, with which they may share a distant relationship. Of the genus Oedogonium there are over 330 species, about 70 species of Bulbochaete, and 10 species of Oedocladium. More than half of these species are known to North America. Many of the species are used by aquarium owners.

Members of the order usually inhabit still waters such as lakes and ponds, rather than rivers and streams. The oedogoniales include free-living and epiphytic members on other algae or freshwater angiosperms.
