= Karl Engelbrecht Hirn =

Finnish botanist

Karl Hirn (1872–1907) was a Finnish botanist, specialized in freshwater algae. He was also a high school teacher.

The standard author abbreviation Hirn is used to indicate this person as the author when citing a botanical name.
