= List of Dothideomycetes taxa incertae sedis =

The following families and genera within the Dothideomycetes class of fungi have an unclear taxonomic placement (incertae sedis), according to the 2007 Outline of Ascomycota. A question mark preceding the genus name means that the placement of that genus within this order is uncertain.

== Families ==
- Argynnaceae
- Ascoporiaceae
- Coccoideaceae
- Cookellaceae
- Englerulaceae
- Eremomycetaceae
- Euantennariaceae
- Fenestellaceae
- Hypsostromataceae
- Leptopeltidaceae
- Meliolinaceae
- Mesnieraceae
- Micropeltidaceae
- Microtheliopsidaceae
- Moriolaceae
- Naetrocymbaceae
- Parodiellaceae
- Parodiopsidaceae
- Polystomellaceae
- Protoscyphaceae
- Pseudoperisporiaceae
- Pyrenidiaceae
- Vizellaceae

== Genera ==
=== A-B ===
- ?Achorella
- Acrogenotheca
- Allothyrium
- Allosoma
- Amylirosa
- Anthracostroma
- Ascocoronospora
- Ascominuta
- Ascoporiaceae
- ?Ascostratum
- Asteroporum
- Belizeana
- Biatriospora
- Biciliopsis
- Bifrontia
- Botryohypoxylon
- Brefeldiella
- Brooksia
- Bryopelta
- Bryorella
- Bryosphaeria
- Bryostroma
- Bryothele
- Byssogene

Top of page

=== C ===
- Calyptra
- Capillataspora
- Capnodinula
- Caryosporella
- Catinella
- Catulus
- Ceratocarpia
- Cercidospora
- Cerodothis
- Chaetoscutula
- Coccochora
- ?Coccochorina
- Colensoniella
- ?Comesella
- Crauatamyces
- ?Cyrtidium
- Cyrtidula
- Cyrtopsis

Top of page

=== D-F ===
- Dangeardiella
- Dawsomyces
- Dawsophila
- Dermatodothella
- Dermatodothis
- Dianesea
- Didymocyrtidium
- ?Didymocyrtis
- Didymopleella
- Diplochorina
- Dolabra
- Dothideopsella
- Dothivalsaria
- Elmerinula
- ?Endococcus
- Epiphegia
- Epiphora
- Extrusothecium
- Flavobathelium

Top of page

=== G-H ===
- Gibberidea
- Gilletiella
- Globoa
- Globulina
- ?Gloeodiscus
- Grandigallia
- ?Griggsia
- Harknessiella
- Heleiosa
- Helicascus
- Heptameria
- Heterosphaeriopsis
- Homostegia
- Hyalocrea
- Hyalosphaera
- Hypobryon
- Hysteropeltella
- Hysteropsis

Top of page

=== K-L ===
- Karschia
- Keratosphaera
- Kirschsteiniothelia
- Koordersiella
- Kusanobotrys
- Lanatosphaera
- Lazarenkoa
- Lembosiopeltis
- Leptosphaerulina
- Leptospora
- ?Leveillina
- ?Licopolia
- Lidophia
- Limaciniopsis
- Lineolata
- ?Lophiosphaerella
- Lopholeptosphaeria

Top of page

=== M-O ===
- Macrovalsaria
- Macroventuria
- Maireella
- Massariola
- Microcyclella
- Microdothella
- Montagnella
- Moriolomyces
- Muellerites
- Mycocryptospora
- Mycodidymella
- Mycoglaena
- Mycopepon
- Mycoporopsis
- Mycothyridium
- Myriangiopsis
- Myriostigmella
- Mytilostoma
- Neopeckia
- Neoventuria
- Otthia

Top of page

=== P ===
- Paraliomyces
- Parmulariella
- Paropodia
- Passeriniella
- Passerinula
- Peroschaeta
- ?Phaeocyrtidula
- Phaeoglaena
- Phaeopeltosphaeria
- ?Phaeosperma
- Phaeotomasellia
- Philobryon
- Philonectria
- Phragmoscutella
- Phragmosperma
- Phycorella
- ?Physalosporopsis
- ?Placodothis
- Placostromella
- Plagiostromella
- Pleiostomellina
- Plejobolus
- ?Pleosphaerellula
- Pleostigma
- Pleotrichiella
- Polysporidiella
- Polystomellopsis
- ?Propolina
- Pseudodidymella
- Pseudomorfea
- Pseudonitschkia
- Pseudopleospora
- Pteridiospora
- Punctillum
- Pycnocarpon
- ?Pyrenochium
- Pyrenocyclus
- Pyrenostigme

Top of page

=== R-T ===
- Racovitziella
- Rhopographus
- ?Robillardiella
- Rosellinula
- Rosenscheldia
- Roumegueria
- Roussoellopsis
- ?Salsuginea
- Santiella
- Scolecobonaria
- Semifissispora
- Semisphaeria
- Septoriella
- Stuartella
- ?Syrropeltis
- Teichosporella
- ?Teratoschaeta
- Thalassoascus
- ?Thelenidia
- Thryptospora
- ?Thyridaria
- Thyrospora
- Tilakiella
- Tirisporella
- Tomeoa
- Tremateia
- Trematosphaeriopsis
- Tyrannosorus

Top of page

=== W-Z ===
- Valsaria
- Vizellopsis
- Westea
- Wettsteinina
- ?Xylopezia
- Yoshinagella

Top of page

== See also ==
- List of Ascomycota genera incertae sedis
