= Kriegeriella =

Scientific classification
- Kingdom: Fungi
- Division: Ascomycota
- Class: Dothideomycetes
- Order: Pleosporales
- Family: Pleosporaceae
- Genus: Kriegeriella; Höhn.

Type species
- Kriegeriella mirabilis Höhn.

Genus of fungi

Kriegeriella is a genus of fungi in the family Pleosporaceae.

The genus name of Kriegeriella is in honour of Karl Wilhelm Krieger (1848-1921), who was a German teacher and botanist (Mycology and Bryology).

The genus was circumscribed by Franz Xaver Rudolf von Höhnel in Ann. Mycol. vol.16 on page 39 in 1918.
