= Plagiostromella =

Scientific classification
- Kingdom: Fungi
- Division: Ascomycota
- Class: Dothideomycetes
- Subclass: incertae sedis
- Genus: Plagiostromella; Höhn.

Type species
- Plagiostromella pleurostoma Höhn.

Species
- P. berberidis P. indica P. leptodermidis P. pleurostoma

Genus of fungi

Plagiostromella is a genus of fungi in the class Dothideomycetes. The relationship of this taxon to other taxa within the class is unknown (incertae sedis).

== See also ==
- List of Dothideomycetes genera incertae sedis
