= Globulina =

Globulina may refer to:

- Globulina (foraminifera), a foraminifer genus
- Globulina (fungus), a Dothideomycetes incertae sedis fungus genus
