= Koordersiella =

Scientific classification
- Kingdom: Fungi
- Division: Ascomycota
- Class: Dothideomycetes
- Subclass: incertae sedis
- Genus: Koordersiella; Höhn. (1909)

Type species
- Koordersiella javanica Höhn. (1909)

Species
- K. cordiae Bat. & I.H.Lima; K. deightonii (D.Hawksw.) D.Hawksw. & O.E.Erikss. K. goianensis Poroca; K. insectivora (Hansf.) D.Hawksw. & O.E.Erikss. K. javanica Höhn. Koordersiella tenuissima (D.Hawksw.) D.Hawksw. Koordersiella variegata (D.Hawksw.) D.Hawksw.

Genus of fungi

Koordersiella is a genus of fungi in the class Dothideomycetes. The relationship of this taxon to other taxa within the class is unknown (incertae sedis).

The genus name of Koordersiella is in honour of Sijfert Hendrik Koorders (1863–1919), who was a Dutch botanist.

The genus was circumscribed by Franz Xaver Rudolf von Höhnel in Sitzungsber. Kaiserl. Akad. Wiss., Math.-Naturwiss. Cl. Abt. vol.1 on pages 118 and 833 in 1909.

== See also ==
- List of Dothideomycetes genera incertae sedis
