= Yoshinagella japonica =

Scientific classification
- Kingdom: Fungi
- Division: Ascomycota
- Class: Dothideomycetes
- Genus: Yoshinagella
- Species: Y. japonica

Binomial name
- Yoshinagella japonica Höhn.

Species of fungus

Yoshinagella japonica is a fungus and the type species in the genus Yoshinagella.
