= A. lignicola =

A. lignicola may refer to:

- Ascominuta lignicola, a fungus species
- Amylolepiota lignicola, a fungus species
- Andricus lignicola, a gall forming wasp species

== See also ==
- Lignicola
