= Coccochora =

Scientific classification
- Kingdom: Fungi
- Division: Ascomycota
- Class: Dothideomycetes
- Subclass: incertae sedis
- Genus: Coccochora; Höhn.

Type species
- Coccochora quercicola (Henn.) Höhn.

Species
- C. kusanoi C. lebeckiae C. quercicola C. rubi

Genus of fungi

Coccochora is a genus of fungi in the class Dothideomycetes. The relationship of this taxon to other taxa within the class is unknown (incertae sedis).

== See also ==
- List of Dothideomycetes genera incertae sedis
