= Gonçalo Sampaio =

Portuguese botanist

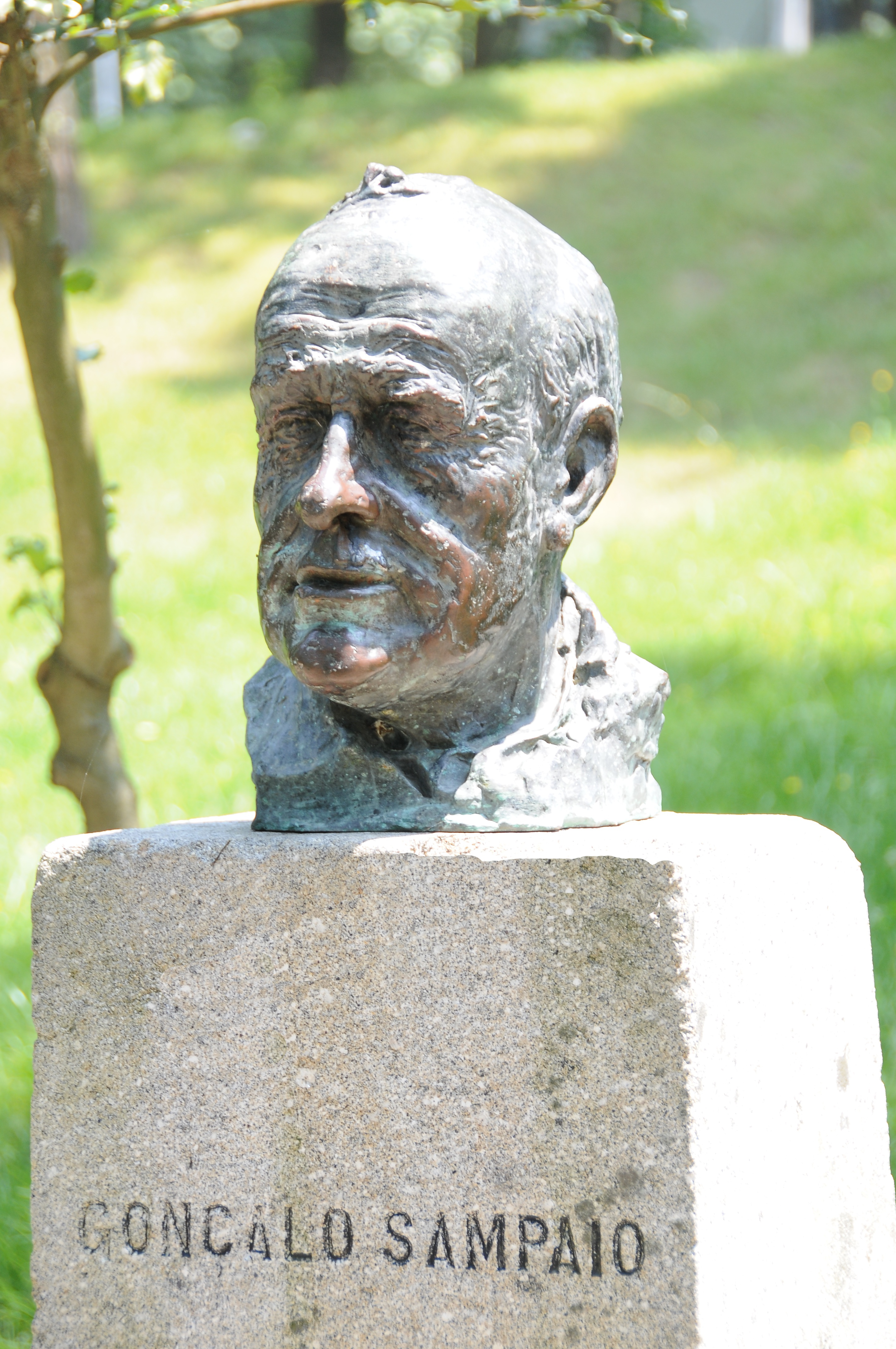
- Bust of the Gonçalo Sampaio, in Parque da Ponte, Braga.
- Born: 29 March 1865; São Gens de Calvos
- Died: 28 July 1937 (aged 72); Porto
- Education: University of Coimbra; Polytechnic Academy of Porto
- Scientific career
- Fields: Botany, taxonomy, mathematics, chemistry, mineralogy
- Workplaces: Polytechnic Academy of Porto; University of Porto
- Author abbrev. (botany): Samp.

Gonçalo António da Silva Ferreira Sampaio (29 March 1865 in São Gens de Calvos – 28 July 1937 in Porto) was a Portuguese botanist.

He studied mathematics at the University of Coimbra and chemistry, mineralogy and botany at the Polytechnic Academy of Porto. From 1890 he served as an assistant naturalist at the Polytechnic Academy. From 1912 to 1935 he was a professor of botany at the faculty of sciences of the University of Porto. In 1923 Sampaio issued the exsiccata Lichenes de Portugal.

As a taxonomist he described around 50 new species of vascular plants, five new species of desmids and about 70 new taxa of lichens that included the genus Carlosia (family Caliciaceae). The mycological genus Sampaioa (Gonz. Frag., 1923; syn. Mycoglaena) commemorates his name.

== Selected works ==
- Estudos sobre a flora dos arredores do Porto. Gen. Spergularia, 1904 – Studies on the flora in the vicinity of Porto; genus Spergularia.
- "Rubus” portuguezes. Contribuções para o seu estudo, 1904 – Rubus native to Portugal.
- Contribuções para o estudo da flora portugueza; Epilobiaceae, 1906 – Contributions for the study of the Portuguese flora; Epilobiaceae.
- Notas criticas sobre a flora portugueza, 1906 – Critical notes involving Portuguese flora.
- Flora vascular de Odemira, 1909 – Vascular plants of Odemira.
- Manual da flora portugueza, 1909–14 – Manual of Portuguese flora.
- Estudos botanicos. Especies novas e nomes novos, 1912 – Botanical studies, new species and new names.
- Lista das espécies representadas no Herbário português, 1913 – List of species represented in the Portuguese Herbarium.
- Apêndice à lista das espécies representadas no Herbário português, 1914 – Appendix to the list of species represented in the Portuguese Herbarium.
