= Naumovia =

Naumovia may refer to:

- Naumovia, a genus of hydrozoa in the family Kirchenpaueriidae; synonym of Kirchenpaueria
- Naumovia Dobrozrakova, 1928, a genus of fungi; synonym of Rosenscheldia
- Naumovia Kurtzman, 2003, a genus of fungi in the family Saccharomycetaceae; synonym of Naumovozyma
