= Calyptra (disambiguation) =

A calyptra is a feature of plant formation. Calyptra may also refer to:

- Calyptra (moth), a moth genus in the family Erebidae
- Calyptra (fungus), a genus of fungi in the class Dothideomycetes
