= Mycoporopsis =

Scientific classification
- Kingdom: Fungi
- Division: Ascomycota
- Class: Dothideomycetes
- Subclass: incertae sedis
- Genus: Mycoporopsis; Müll. Arg.

Type species
- Mycoporopsis sorenocarpa (C. Knight) Müll. Arg.

Genus of fungi

Mycoporopsis is a genus of fungi in the class Dothideomycetes. The relationship of this taxon to other taxa within the class is unknown (incertae sedis).

== Species ==
- Mycoporopsis abrothalloides
- Mycoporopsis californica
- Mycoporopsis deserticola
- Mycoporopsis exigua
- Mycoporopsis leucoplaca
- Mycoporopsis melacocca
- Mycoporopsis microscopica
- Mycoporopsis phaeosporizans
- Mycoporopsis pithyophila
- Mycoporopsis rappii
- Mycoporopsis roseola
- Mycoporopsis sorenocarpa
- Mycoporopsis tantilla
- Mycoporopsis tetramera
- Mycoporopsis vernicea

== See also ==
- List of Dothideomycetes genera incertae sedis
