= Mycoglaena =

Scientific classification
- Kingdom: Fungi
- Division: Ascomycota
- Class: Dothideomycetes
- Subclass: incertae sedis
- Genus: Mycoglaena; Höhn. (1909)

Type species
- Mycoglaena subcoerulescens (Nyl.) Höhn. (1909)

Species
- Arthopyreniella J.Steiner (1911); Sampaioa Gonz.Frag. (1924); Bertossia Cif. & Tomas. (1953)

Genus of fungi

Mycoglaena is a genus of fungi in the class Dothideomycetes. The relationship of this taxon to other taxa within the class is unknown (incertae sedis).

== Species ==
- Mycoglaena acuminans
- Mycoglaena alni
- Mycoglaena betularia
- Mycoglaena collosporella
- Mycoglaena elegans
- Mycoglaena fallaciosa
- Mycoglaena fllicina
- Mycoglaena kuemmerlei
- Mycoglaena lichenoides
- Mycoglaena myricae
- Mycoglaena quercicola
- Mycoglaena subcoerulescens
- Mycoglaena viridis
- Mycoglaena yasudae

== See also ==
- List of Dothideomycetes genera incertae sedis
