= Heleiosa =

Scientific classification
- Kingdom: Fungi
- Division: Ascomycota
- Class: Dothideomycetes
- Subclass: incertae sedis
- Genus: Heleiosa; Kohlm., Volkm.-Kohlm. & O.E.Erikss. (1996)

Type species
- Heleiosa barbatula Kohlm., Volkm.-Kohlm. & O.E.Erikss. (1996)

Genus of fungi

Heleiosa is a genus of fungi in the class Dothideomycetes. The relationship of this taxon to other taxa within the class is unknown (incertae sedis). A monotypic genus, it contains the single species Heleiosa barbatula.

== See also ==
- List of Dothideomycetes genera incertae sedis
