= Dolabra (fungus) =

Scientific classification
- Kingdom: Fungi
- Division: Ascomycota
- Class: Dothideomycetes
- Subclass: incertae sedis
- Genus: Dolabra; C.Booth & W.P.Ting (1964)

Type species
- Dolabra nepheliae C.Booth & W.P.Ting (1964)

Genus of fungi

Dolabra is a genus of fungi in the class Dothideomycetes. The relationship of this taxon to other taxa within the class is unknown (incertae sedis). A monotypic genus, it contains the single species Dolabra nepheliae.

== See also ==
- List of Dothideomycetes genera incertae sedis
