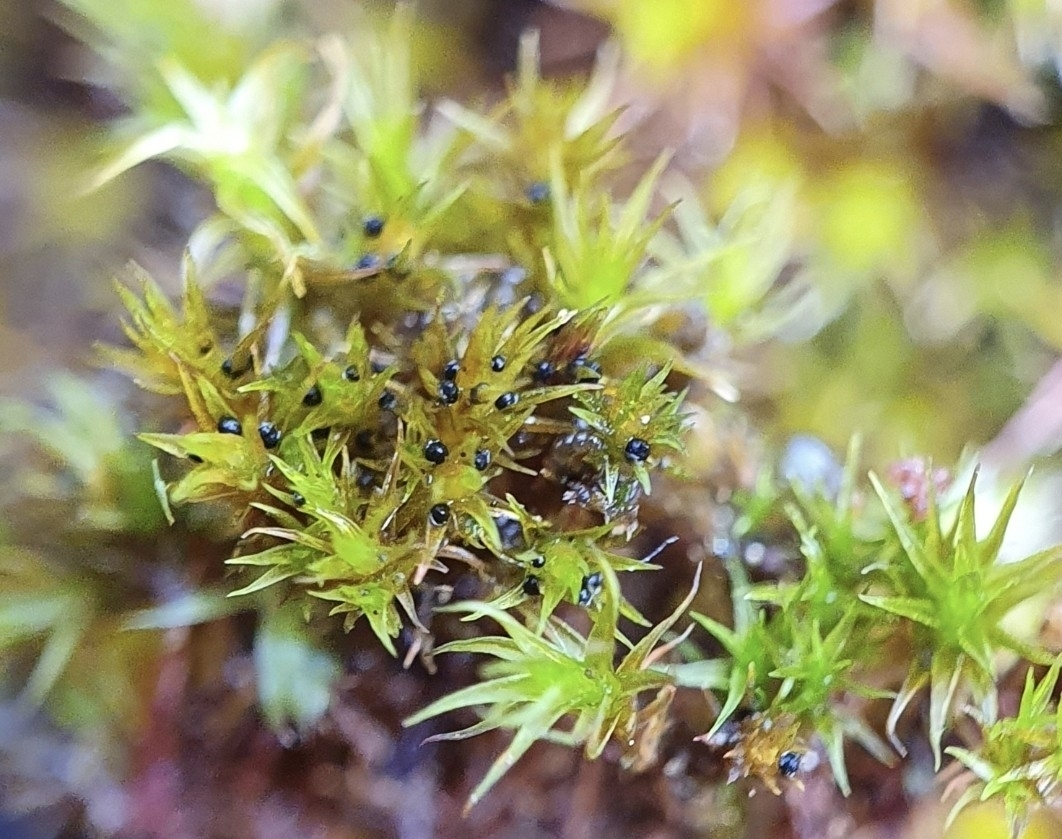
- Bryostroma trichostomi parasitic on Didymodon rigidulus

Scientific classification
- Domain: Eukaryota
- Kingdom: Fungi
- Division: Ascomycota
- Class: Dothideomycetes
- Genus: Bryostroma; Döbbeler

Type species
- Bryostroma rhacomitrii Döbbeler

= Bryostroma =

Genus of fungi

Bryostroma is a genus of fungi in the class Dothideomycetes. The relationship of this taxon to other taxa within the class is unknown (incertae sedis).

== Species ==
- Bryostroma axillare
- Bryostroma bryi
- Bryostroma guttulatum
- Bryostroma halosporum
- Bryostroma necans
- Bryostroma rhacomitrii
- Bryostroma trichostomi

== See also ==
- List of Dothideomycetes genera incertae sedis
