= Placostromella =

Scientific classification
- Kingdom: Fungi
- Division: Ascomycota
- Class: Dothideomycetes
- Subclass: incertae sedis
- Genus: Placostromella; Petr.

Type species
- Placostromella macrospora Petr.

Species
- P. amazonensis P. castanopsidis P. macrospora

Genus of fungi

Placostromella is a genus of fungi in the class Dothideomycetes. The relationship of this taxon to other taxa within the class is unknown (incertae sedis).

== See also ==
- List of Dothideomycetes genera incertae sedis
