= Dermatodothis =

Scientific classification
- Kingdom: Fungi
- Division: Ascomycota
- Class: Dothideomycetes
- Subclass: incertae sedis
- Genus: Dermatodothis; Racib. ex Theiss. & Syd. (1914)

Type species
- Dermatodothis javanica Racib. (1914)

Genus of fungi

Dermatodothis is a genus of fungi in the class Dothideomycetes. The relationship of this taxon to other taxa within the class is unknown (incertae sedis). The genus was described by Polish botanist Marjan Raciborski in 1914.

== Species ==
- Dermatodothis buddlejae
- Dermatodothis euonymi
- Dermatodothis jahnii
- Dermatodothis japonica
- Dermatodothis javanica
- Dermatodothis quercicola
- Dermatodothis symploci
- Dermatodothis zeylanica

== See also ==
- List of Dothideomycetes genera incertae sedis
