= Didymocyrtidium =

Scientific classification
- Kingdom: Fungi
- Division: Ascomycota
- Class: Dothideomycetes
- Subclass: incertae sedis
- Genus: Didymocyrtidium; Vain. (1921)

Species
- D. mozambicum D. nudum D. populnellum

Genus of fungi

Didymocyrtidium is a genus of fungi in the class Dothideomycetes. The relationship of this taxon to other taxa within the class is unknown (incertae sedis).

== See also ==
- List of Dothideomycetes genera incertae sedis
