= Ceratocarpia =

Scientific classification
- Kingdom: Fungi
- Division: Ascomycota
- Class: Dothideomycetes
- Subclass: incertae sedis
- Genus: Ceratocarpia; Rolland

Type species
- Ceratocarpia cactorum Rolland

Species
- C. cactorum C. theobromae C. wrightii

Genus of fungi

Ceratocarpia is a genus of fungi in the class Dothideomycetes. The relationship of this taxon to other taxa within the class is unknown (incertae sedis).

== See also ==
- List of Dothideomycetes genera incertae sedis
