= Wettsteinina =

Scientific classification
- Kingdom: Fungi
- Division: Ascomycota
- Class: Dothideomycetes
- Order: Pleosporales
- Family: Pleosporaceae
- Genus: Wettsteinina; Höhn. (1907)

Type species
- Wettsteinina gigantospora (Rehm) Höhn. (1907)

Genus of fungi

Wettsteinina is a genus of fungi in the class Dothideomycetes. The type species Wettsteinina gigantospora was first described by Franz Xaver Rudolf von Höhnel in 1907. The relationship of this taxon to other taxa within the class was unknown in 2008, until it was resolved and placed in the Pleosporaceae family.

== Species ==
As accepted by Species Fungorum;

- Wettsteinina ambigua Petr. (1924)
- Wettsteinina arctica Shoemaker & C.E. Babc. (1987)
- Wettsteinina barriae Shoemaker & C.E. Babc. (1987)
- Wettsteinina bupleuri Shoemaker & C.E. Babc. (1987)
- Wettsteinina candida Shoemaker & C.E. Babc. (1987)
- Wettsteinina carinthiaca Petr. (1955)
- Wettsteinina carissae R. Rao (1972)
- Wettsteinina corni (Fuckel) Aptroot (1998)
- Wettsteinina coryli Hansf. (1956)
- Wettsteinina douglasii Shoemaker & C.E. Babc. (1987)
- Wettsteinina dryadis (Rostr.) Petr. (1947)
- Wettsteinina duplex Shoemaker & C.E. Babc. (1987)
- Wettsteinina eliassonii Petr. (1955)
- Wettsteinina engadinensis E. Müll. (1950)
- Wettsteinina eucarpa (P. Karst.) E. Müll. & Arx (1950)
- Wettsteinina gentianae (Wehm.) M.E. Barr (1972)
- Wettsteinina gigaspora Höhn. (1907)
- Wettsteinina junci Shoemaker & C.E. Babc. (1987)
- Wettsteinina kashmirensis Shoemaker & C.E. Babc. (1987)
- Wettsteinina kobresiae Shoemaker & C.E. Babc. (1987)
- Wettsteinina lacustris (Fuckel) Shoemaker & C.E. Babc. (1989)
- Wettsteinina luzulae Shoemaker & C.E. Babc. (1987)
- Wettsteinina macrospora (Wehm.) Petr. (1958)
- Wettsteinina macrotheca (Rostr.) E. Müll. (1959)
- Wettsteinina magnifica Shoemaker & C.E. Babc. (1987)
- Wettsteinina mirabilis (Niessl) Höhn. (1907)
- Wettsteinina moniliformis Van Ryck. & Aptroot (2001)
- Wettsteinina niesslii E. Müll. (1950)
- Wettsteinina operculata M.E. Barr (1972)
- Wettsteinina oreophila Shoemaker & C.E. Babc. (1987)
- Wettsteinina pachyasca (Niessl) Petr. ex M.E. Barr (1972)
- Wettsteinina papuana Otani (1973)
- Wettsteinina philadelphi Crous & R.K. Schumach. (2018)
- Wettsteinina phoenicis Tilak (1968)
- Wettsteinina phragmosporae Otani (1973)
- Wettsteinina phyllodiorum (McAlpine) J. Walker (1984)
- Wettsteinina plantaginicola (Höhn.) Aptroot (2006)
- Wettsteinina polygonorum Stepanova (1980)
- Wettsteinina sabalicola (Earle) M.E. Barr (1972)
- Wettsteinina salicicola Nograsek (1990)
- Wettsteinina savilei Shoemaker & C.E. Babc. (1987)
- Wettsteinina triseptata Lar.N. Vassiljeva (1984)
- Wettsteinina victorialis Lar.N. Vassiljeva (1986)
- Wettsteinina waltraudiae Scheuer (1988)
- Wettsteinina winteri (Niessl) E. Müll. (1950)
- Wettsteinina xerophylli (Ellis) Aptroot (1998)

Former species;

- W. andromedae (Auersw.) M.E. Barr (1959) = Extrawettsteinina andromedae, Pleosporaceae
- W. andromedae var. cassiopes (Dearn. & House ex M.E. Barr) M.E. Barr (1967) = Extrawettsteinina andromedae, Pleosporaceae
- W. anomala (Ellis & Everh.) M.E. Barr (1972) = Didymolepta anomala, Didymellaceae
- W. callista (Rehm) Petr. (1947) = Wettsteinina mirabilis
- W. distincta (P. Karst.) L. Holm & K. Holm (1994) = Didymella distincta, Didymellaceae
- W. ellisii M.E. Barr (1972) = Dothiora ellisii, Botryosphaeriaceae
- W. gigantospora (Rehm) Höhn. (1907) = Wettsteinina mirabilisete
- W. marina (Ellis & Everh.) Shoemaker & C.E. Babc. (1989) = Leptosphaeria marina, Leptosphaeriaceae
- W. mediterranea E. Müll. (1965) = Kriegeriella mediterranea, Pleosporaceae
- W. sieversiae (Peck) M.E. Barr (1967) = Diadema sieversiae, Diademaceae
- W. vossii (Rehm) Höhn. (1907) = Wettsteinina mirabilis
- W. yuccigena M.E. Barr (1972) = Planistromella yuccigena, Planistromellaceae
