= Mycopepon =

Scientific classification
- Kingdom: Fungi
- Division: Ascomycota
- Class: Dothideomycetes
- Subclass: incertae sedis
- Genus: Mycopepon; Boise

Type species
- Mycopepon anensis Boise

Species
- M. anensis M. guianensis M. smithii

Genus of fungi

Mycopepon is a genus of fungi in the class Dothideomycetes. The relationship of this taxon to other taxa within the class is unknown (incertae sedis).

== See also ==
- List of Dothideomycetes genera incertae sedis
