= Hyalosphaera =

Scientific classification
- Kingdom: Fungi
- Division: Ascomycota
- Class: Dothideomycetes
- Subclass: incertae sedis
- Genus: Hyalosphaera; F.Stevens (1917)

Type species
- Hyalosphaera miconiae F.Stevens (1917)

Species
- H. ciliata H. miconiae H. pulchella

Genus of fungi

Hyalosphaera is a genus of fungi in the class Dothideomycetes. The relationship of this taxon to other taxa within the class is unknown (incertae sedis).

== See also ==
- List of Dothideomycetes genera incertae sedis
