= Phragmosperma =

Scientific classification
- Kingdom: Fungi
- Division: Ascomycota
- Class: Dothideomycetes
- Subclass: incertae sedis
- Genus: Phragmosperma; Theiss. & Syd.

Type species
- Phragmosperma marattiae (Henn.) Theiss. & Syd.

Species
- P. ilicis P. marattiae P. rickianum

Genus of fungi

Phragmosperma is a genus of fungi in the class Dothideomycetes. The relationship of this taxon to other taxa within the class is unknown (incertae sedis).

== See also ==
- List of Dothideomycetes genera incertae sedis
