= Biatriospora =

Scientific classification
- Kingdom: Fungi
- Division: Ascomycota
- Class: Dothideomycetes
- Subclass: incertae sedis
- Genus: Biatriospora; K.D. Hyde & Borse

Type species
- Biatriospora marina K.D. Hyde & Borse

Genus of fungi

Biatriospora is a genus of fungi in the class Dothideomycetes. The relationship of this taxon to other taxa within the class is unknown (incertae sedis). This is a monotypic genus, consisting of the single species Biatriospora marina.

== See also ==
- List of Dothideomycetes genera incertae sedis
