= Polystomellopsis =

Scientific classification
- Kingdom: Fungi
- Division: Ascomycota
- Class: Dothideomycetes
- Subclass: incertae sedis
- Genus: Polystomellopsis; F. Stevens

Type species
- Polystomellopsis mirabilis F. Stevens

Genus of fungi

Polystomellopsis is a genus of fungi in the class Dothideomycetes. The relationship of this taxon to other taxa within the class is unknown (incertae sedis). A monotypic genus, it contains the single species Polystomellopsis mirabilis.

== See also ==
- List of Dothideomycetes genera incertae sedis
