= Dawsophila =

Scientific classification
- Kingdom: Fungi
- Division: Ascomycota
- Class: Dothideomycetes
- Subclass: incertae sedis
- Genus: Dawsophila; Döbbeler (1981)

Type species
- Dawsophila pygmaea Döbbeler (1981)

Species
- D. callichroma D. polycarpa D. pygmaea

Genus of fungi

Dawsophila is a genus of fungi in the class Dothideomycetes. The relationship of this taxon to other taxa within the class is unknown (incertae sedis).

== See also ==
- List of Dothideomycetes genera incertae sedis
