= Syrropeltis =

Scientific classification
- Kingdom: Fungi
- Division: Ascomycota
- Class: Dothideomycetes
- Subclass: incertae sedis
- Genus: Syrropeltis; Bat., J.L. Bezerra & Matta

Type species
- Syrropeltis xylopiae Bat., J.L. Bezerra & Matta

Genus of fungi

Syrropeltis is a genus of fungi in the class Dothideomycetes. The relationship of this taxon to other taxa within the class is unknown (incertae sedis). Also, the placement of this genus within the Dothideomycetes is uncertain. A monotypic genus, it contains the single species Syrropeltis xylopiae.

== See also ==
- List of Dothideomycetes genera incertae sedis
