= Licopolia =

Scientific classification
- Kingdom: Fungi
- Division: Ascomycota
- Class: Dothideomycetes
- Subclass: incertae sedis
- Genus: Licopolia; Sacc., Syd. & P. Syd

Type species
- Licopolia franciscana Sacc., Syd. & P. Syd.

Species
- L. franciscana L. keniensis

Genus of fungi

Licopolia is a genus of fungi in the class Dothideomycetes. The relationship of this taxon to other taxa within the class is unknown (incertae sedis). Also, the placement of this genus within the Dothideomycetes is uncertain.

The genus name of Licopolia is in honour of Gaetano Licopoli (1833-1897), who was an Italian botanist. In Naples, he was professor of botany at the University of Naples Federico II and director of the Botanical Garden of Naples in 1883.

The genus was circumscribed by Pier Andrea Saccardo, Hans Sydow and Paul Sydow in Bull. Herb. Boissier ser.2, vol.1 on page 79 in 1900.

== See also ==
- List of Dothideomycetes genera incertae sedis
