= Phaeosperma =

Scientific classification
- Kingdom: Fungi
- Division: Ascomycota
- Class: Dothideomycetes
- Subclass: incertae sedis
- Genus: Phaeosperma; Nitschke ex Fuckel

Genus of fungi

Phaeosperma is a genus of fungi in the class Dothideomycetes. The relationship of this taxon to other taxa within the class is unknown (incertae sedis). Also, the placement of this genus within the Dothideomycetes is uncertain.

== Species ==
- Phaeosperma ailanthi
- Phaeosperma boehmeriae
- Phaeosperma cariei
- Phaeosperma dryophilum
- Phaeosperma fennica
- Phaeosperma foeniculinum
- Phaeosperma gilliesi
- Phaeosperma helvetica
- Phaeosperma leptosporum
- Phaeosperma microspora
- Phaeosperma saccardoanum
- Phaeosperma sarrazinianum
- Phaeosperma valdiviense

== See also ==
- List of Dothideomycetes genera incertae sedis
