= Achorella =

Scientific classification
- Kingdom: Fungi
- Division: Ascomycota
- Class: Dothideomycetes
- Subclass: incertae sedis
- Genus: Achorella; Theiss. & Syd.

Type species
- Achorella ametableta (Rehm) Theiss. & Syd.

Genus of fungi

Achorella is a genus of fungi in the class Dothideomycetes. The relationship of this taxon to other taxa within the class is unknown (incertae sedis). Also, the placement of this genus within the Dothideomycetes is uncertain.

== Species ==
- Achorella ametableta
- Achorella andina
- Achorella attaleae
- Achorella centrolobii
- Achorella costaricensis
- Achorella gastrolobii
- Achorella guianensis
- Achorella juruana
- Achorella plectroniae
- Achorella saginata
- Achorella toroana
- Achorella vaccinii

== See also ==
- List of Dothideomycetes genera incertae sedis
