= Capnodinula =

Scientific classification
- Kingdom: Fungi
- Division: Ascomycota
- Class: Dothideomycetes
- Subclass: incertae sedis
- Genus: Capnodinula; Bat. & Cif.

Type species
- Capnodinula trichodea (Rehm) Speg.

Species
- C. annonae C. costesii C. ramosella C. tonduzii C. trichodea

Genus of fungi

Capnodinula is a genus of fungi in the class Dothideomycetes. The relationship of this taxon to other taxa within the class is unknown (incertae sedis).

== See also ==
- List of Dothideomycetes genera incertae sedis
