= Colensoniella =

Scientific classification
- Kingdom: Fungi
- Division: Ascomycota
- Class: Dothideomycetes
- Subclass: incertae sedis
- Genus: Colensoniella; Hafellner

Type species
- Colensoniella torulispora (W. Phillips) Hafellner

Genus of fungi

Colensoniella is a genus of fungi in the class Dothideomycetes. The relationship of this taxon to other taxa within the class is unknown (incertae sedis). A monotypic genus, it contains the single species Colensoniella torulispora.

The genus name of Colensoniella is in honour of A. Colenso, the plant collector of the plant in New Zealand.

The genus was circumscribed by Josef Hafellner in Beih. Nova Hedwigia Vol.62 on page 160 in 1979.

== See also ==
- List of Dothideomycetes genera incertae sedis
