= Mycothyridium =

Scientific classification
- Kingdom: Fungi
- Division: Ascomycota
- Class: Dothideomycetes
- Subclass: incertae sedis
- Genus: Mycothyridium; Petr.

Type species
- Xylosphaeria elliptica G.H. Otth

Genus of fungi

Mycothyridium is a genus of fungi in the class Dothideomycetes. The relationship of this taxon to other taxa within the class is unknown (incertae sedis).

== Species ==
- Mycothyridium adeanum
- Mycothyridium ahmadii
- Mycothyridium americanum
- Mycothyridium andicola
- Mycothyridium antiquum
- Mycothyridium argentinense
- Mycothyridium boehmeriae
- Mycothyridium cacheutense
- Mycothyridium ceanothi
- Mycothyridium cingulatum
- Mycothyridium coffeicola
- Mycothyridium concinnum
- Mycothyridium deviatum
- Mycothyridium flavum
- Mycothyridium floridanum
- Mycothyridium fusisporum
- Mycothyridium lividum
- Mycothyridium macedonicum
- Mycothyridium marylandicum
- Mycothyridium nobile
- Mycothyridium pakistani
- Mycothyridium pallidum
- Mycothyridium personatum
- Mycothyridium platense
- Mycothyridium pulchellum
- Mycothyridium quimelense
- Mycothyridium rechingeri
- Mycothyridium rousselianum
- Mycothyridium sambuci
- Mycothyridium semnanense
- Mycothyridium speciosum
- Mycothyridium stilbostomum
- Mycothyridium syringae
- Mycothyridium tuberculatum
- Mycothyridium valparadisiacum
- Mycothyridium vestitum
- Mycothyridium vitis
- Mycothyridium yerbae

== See also ==
- List of Dothideomycetes genera incertae sedis
