= Physalosporopsis =

Scientific classification
- Kingdom: Fungi
- Division: Ascomycota
- Class: Dothideomycetes
- Subclass: incertae sedis
- Genus: Physalosporopsis; Bat. & H. Maia

Type species
- Physalosporopsis rhizophoricola Bat. & H. Maia

Genus of fungi

Physalosporopsis is a genus of fungi in the class Dothideomycetes. The relationship of this taxon to other taxa within the class is unknown (incertae sedis). Also, the placement of this genus within the Dothideomycetes is uncertain. A monotypic genus, it contains the single species Physalosporopsis rhizophoricola.

== See also ==
- List of Dothideomycetes genera incertae sedis
