= Hyalocrea =

Scientific classification
- Kingdom: Fungi
- Division: Ascomycota
- Class: Dothideomycetes
- Subclass: incertae sedis
- Genus: Hyalocrea; Syd. & P. Syd.

Type species
- Hyalocrea epimyces Syd. & P. Syd.

Species
- H. epimyces H. jasmini

Genus of fungi

Hyalocrea is a genus of fungi in the class Dothideomycetes. The relationship of this taxon to other taxa within the class is unknown (incertae sedis).

== See also ==
- List of Dothideomycetes genera incertae sedis
