= Westea =

Scientific classification
- Kingdom: Fungi
- Division: Ascomycota
- Class: Dothideomycetes
- Subclass: incertae sedis
- Genus: Westea; H.J.Swart (1988)

Type species
- Westea banksiae H.J.Swart (1988)

Genus of fungi

Westea is a genus of fungi in the class Dothideomycetes. The relationship of this taxon to other taxa within the class is unknown (incertae sedis). A monotypic genus, it contains the single species Westea banksiae, which grows on Banksia trees in Australia. Described by South African botanist Haring Johannes 'Harry' Swart, it was originally collected from the leaves of Banksia integrifolia in Victoria.

== See also ==
- List of Dothideomycetes genera incertae sedis
