= Elmerinula =

Scientific classification
- Kingdom: Fungi
- Division: Ascomycota
- Class: Dothideomycetes
- Subclass: incertae sedis
- Genus: Elmerinula; Syd. (1934)

Type species
- Elmerinula capnoides Syd. (1934)

Genus of fungi

Elmerinula is a fungus genus in the class Dothideomycetes. The relationship of this taxon to other taxa within the class is unknown (incertae sedis). A monotypic genus, it contains the single species Elmerinula capnoides.

== See also ==
- List of Dothideomycetes genera incertae sedis
