= Anna Koorders-Schumacher =

Dutch botanist

Anna Koorders-Schumacher (1870–1934) was a German-born Dutch botanist. She was married to Dutch botanist Sijfert Hendrik Koorders, with whom she co-authored books on Javanese plants

== Written works ==
- Koorders-Schumacher, Anna (1913). Systematisches Verzeichnis der zum Herbar Koorders gehörenden, in Niederländisch-Ostindien, besonders in den Jahren 1888-1903 gesammelten Phanerogamen und Pteridophyten nach den Original-Einsammlungsnotizen und Bestimmungs-Etiketten, unter der Leitung von Dr. S.H. Koorders (in German). Im Selbstverlag der Verfasserin.
- Koorders, Sijfert Hendrik; Koorders-Schumacher, Anna (1913). Exkursionsflora Von Java, Umfassend Die Blütenpflanzen Mit Besonderer Berücksichtigung Der Im Hochgebirge Wildwachsenden Arten. G. Fischer.

The standard author abbreviation Koord.-Schum. is used to indicate this person as the author when citing a botanical name.
