= Capillataspora =

Scientific classification
- Kingdom: Fungi
- Division: Ascomycota
- Class: Dothideomycetes
- Subclass: incertae sedis
- Genus: Capillataspora; K.D. Hyde

Type species
- Capillataspora corticola K.D. Hyde

Genus of fungi

Capillataspora is a genus of fungi in the class Dothideomycetes. The relationship of this taxon to other taxa within the class is unknown (incertae sedis). A monotypic genus, it contains the single species Capillataspora corticola.

Capillataspora corticola has been found with other fungi such as Etheirophora blepharospora, Caryosporella rhizophorae, Hydrophloeda rhizospora and Rhizophila marina on Rhizophora (Mangroves trees) in Hong Kong and the South China Sea.

== See also ==
- List of Dothideomycetes genera incertae sedis
