= Rhopographus =

- Rhopographus filicinus

Scientific classification
- Kingdom: Fungi
- Division: Ascomycota
- Class: Dothideomycetes
- Subclass: incertae sedis
- Genus: Rhopographus; Nitschke ex Fuckel (1870)

Type species
- Rhopographus filicinus (Fr.) Nitschke ex Fuckel (1870)

Genus of fungi

Rhopographus is a genus of fungi in the class Dothideomycetes. The relationship of this taxon to other taxa within the class is unknown (incertae sedis).

== See also ==
- List of Dothideomycetes genera incertae sedis
