= Lophiosphaerella =

Scientific classification
- Kingdom: Fungi
- Division: Ascomycota
- Class: Dothideomycetes
- Subclass: incertae sedis
- Genus: Lophiosphaerella; Hara

Type species
- Lophiosphaerella euryae (Syd.) Hara

Genus of fungi

Lophiosphaerella is a genus of fungi in the class Dothideomycetes. The relationship of this taxon to other taxa within the class is unknown (incertae sedis). Also, the placement of this genus within the Dothideomycetes is uncertain. A monotypic genus, it contains the single species Lophiosphaerella euryae.

== See also ==
- List of Dothideomycetes genera incertae sedis
