= Macrovalsaria =

Scientific classification
- Kingdom: Fungi
- Division: Ascomycota
- Class: Dothideomycetes
- Subclass: incertae sedis
- Genus: Macrovalsaria; Petr.

Type species
- Macrovalsaria leonensis (Deighton) Petr.

Species
- M. leonensis M. megalospora

Genus of fungi

Macrovalsaria is a genus of fungi in the class Dothideomycetes. The relationship of this taxon to other taxa within the class is unknown (incertae sedis).

== See also ==
- List of Dothideomycetes genera incertae sedis
