= Hysteropsis =

Scientific classification
- Kingdom: Fungi
- Division: Ascomycota
- Class: Dothideomycetes
- Subclass: incertae sedis
- Genus: Hysteropsis; Rehm (1887)

Type species
- Hysteropsis culmigena Rehm (1887)

Species
- H. brasiliensis H. corticola H. culmigena H. guajavae H. laricina H. larigna H. zoggii

Genus of fungi

Hysteropsis is a genus of fungi in the class Dothideomycetes. The relationship of this taxon to other taxa within the class is unknown (incertae sedis).

== See also ==
- List of Dothideomycetes genera incertae sedis
