= Hypobryon =

Scientific classification
- Kingdom: Fungi
- Division: Ascomycota
- Class: Dothideomycetes
- Subclass: incertae sedis
- Genus: Hypobryon; Döbbeler (1983)

Type species
- Hypobryon poeltii (Döbbeler) Döbbeler (1983)

Species
- H. bicolor H. florentinum H. heterotropum H. insigne H. perforans H. poeltii H. validum

Genus of fungi

Hypobryon is a genus of fungi in the class Dothideomycetes. The relationship of this taxon to other taxa within the class is unknown (incertae sedis).

== See also ==
- List of Dothideomycetes genera incertae sedis
