= Lineolata =

Scientific classification
- Kingdom: Fungi
- Division: Ascomycota
- Class: Dothideomycetes
- Subclass: incertae sedis
- Genus: Lineolata; Kohlm. & Volkm.-Kohlm.

Type species
- Lineolata rhizophorae (Kohlm. & E. Kohlm.) Kohlm. & Volkm.-Kohlm.

Genus of fungi

Lineolata is a genus of fungi in the class Dothideomycetes. The relationship of this taxon to other taxa within the class is unknown (incertae sedis). A monotypic genus, it contains the single species Lineolata rhizophorae.

== See also ==
- List of Dothideomycetes genera incertae sedis
