= Semisphaeria =

Scientific classification
- Kingdom: Fungi
- Division: Ascomycota
- Class: Dothideomycetes
- Subclass: incertae sedis
- Genus: Semisphaeria; K. Holm & L. Holm

Type species
- Semisphaeria sigmundii K. Holm & L. Holm

Genus of fungi

Semisphaeria is a genus of fungi in the class Dothideomycetes. The relationship of this taxon to other taxa within the class is unknown (incertae sedis). A monotypic genus, it contains the single species Semisphaeria sigmundii.

== See also ==
- List of Dothideomycetes genera incertae sedis
