= Teratoschaeta =

Scientific classification
- Kingdom: Fungi
- Division: Ascomycota
- Class: Dothideomycetes
- Subclass: incertae sedis
- Genus: Teratoschaeta; Bat. & O.M. Fonseca

Type species
- Teratoschaeta rondoniensis Bat. & O.M. Fonseca

Genus of fungi

Teratoschaeta is a genus of fungi in the class Dothideomycetes. The relationship of this taxon to other taxa within the class is unknown (incertae sedis). Also, the placement of this genus within the Dothideomycetes is uncertain. A monotypic genus, it contains the single species Teratoschaeta rondoniensis.

== See also ==
- List of Dothideomycetes genera incertae sedis
