= Cyrtidula =

Scientific classification
- Domain: Eukaryota
- Kingdom: Fungi
- Division: Ascomycota
- Class: Dothideomycetes
- Order: incertae sedis
- Family: incertae sedis
- Genus: Cyrtidula; Minks (1876)

Species
- C. hippocastani C. larigna C. major C. quercus C. subcembrina

Genus of fungi

Cyrtidula is a genus of lichen-forming fungi in the class Dothideomycetes. The relationship of this taxon to other taxa within the class is unknown (incertae sedis).

== Species ==
As of July 2024, Species Fungorum (in the Catalogue of Life) accept five species of Cyrtidula:

- Cyrtidula hippocastani (DC.) R.C.Harris (1995)
- Cyrtidula larigna (Lambotte & Fautrey) Höhn. (1927)
- Cyrtidula major (Nyl.) Vain. (1921)
- Cyrtidula quercus (A.Massal.) Minks (1891)
- Cyrtidula subcembrina (Anzi) Minks (1891)

== See also ==
- List of Dothideomycetes genera incertae sedis
