= Myriostigmella =

Scientific classification
- Kingdom: Fungi
- Division: Ascomycota
- Class: Dothideomycetes
- Subclass: incertae sedis
- Genus: Myriostigmella; G. Arnaud

Genus of fungi

Myriostigmella is a genus of fungi in the class Dothideomycetes. The relationship of this taxon to other taxa within the class is unknown (incertae sedis). The genus was named by Gabriel Arnaud in 1952.

== See also ==
- List of Dothideomycetes genera incertae sedis
