= Asteroporum =

Scientific classification
- Kingdom: Fungi
- Division: Ascomycota
- Class: Dothideomycetes
- Order: incertae sedis
- Family: incertae sedis
- Genus: Asteroporum; Müll.Arg. (1884)

Type species
- Asteroporum perminimum Müll.Arg. (1884)

Species
- A. deformatum A. minimum A. orbiculinum A. parasiticum A. perminimum A. punctuliforme

Synonyms
- Asteroporomyces Cif. & Tomas. (1953)

Genus of lichens

Asteroporum is a little-known genus of putatively lichen-forming fungi of uncertain familial and ordinal placement in the Dothideomycetes. It comprises six species.

== Taxonomy ==
The genus was circumscribed in 1884 by Johannes Müller Argoviensis. The original description was based on a single known example collected from Palestine, A. perminimum, the type species. The genus name refers to the star-shaped opening of its fruiting bodies (apothecia). A. perminimum, grows in an extremely reduced form with no visible thallus (fungal body) on the rock surface except where the reproductive structures appear.

The type species A. perminimum was found growing on small calcareous rocks near Petiville. Its fruit bodies are round to slightly oval, somewhat flattened with a slightly depressed centre, and have a distinct black rim. The spores measure 12–17 micrometres long by 7–8 micrometres wide, with a slight pinching in the middle, and the upper part of each spore is slightly wider than the lower part.

In 1926, Alexander Zahlbruckner transferred some species to the genus that had originally been described in the genus Astrotrema.

The genus has been little used since its original proposal. Reflecting the uncertainty of its taxonomic relationships, it has been variously classified as incertae sedis (uncertain placement) in the order Pyrenulales, the Arthoniales, the subdivision Pezizomycotina, and the division Ascomycota. In The 2024 Outline of Fungi and fungus-like taxa, it is listed as being of uncertain placement in the Dothideomycetes. Robert Lücking and colleagues noted in 2017: "Whether the type species is actually lichenized is questionable; the genus is certainly heterogeneous".

== Description ==
Key distinguishing features of genus Asteroporum include:

- tiny fruit bodies (perithecia) measuring just 0.1 mm wide
- distinctive star-shaped opening that splits into 3–4 lobes
- hyaline (translucent) spores that are divided by cross-walls (septa)
- simple, sparse internal threads (paraphyses)
- structure similar to Mycoporum but with fewer spore-producing chambers

== Species ==
- Asteroporum deformatum Zahlbr. (1928)
- Asteroporum minimum Müll.Arg. (1884)
- Asteroporum orbiculinum (Müll.Arg.) Zahlbr. (1926)
- Asteroporum parasiticum (Müll.Arg.) Zahlbr. (1926)
- Asteroporum perminimum Müll.Arg. (1884)
- Asteroporum punctuliforme (Müll.Arg.) Zahlbr. (1926)

The taxon Asteroporum rimale Müll.Arg. (1895) was determined to be a synonym of Arthonia banksiae.

== See also ==
- List of Dothideomycetes taxa incertae sedis
