= Philonectria =

Scientific classification
- Kingdom: Fungi
- Division: Ascomycota
- Class: Dothideomycetes
- Subclass: incertae sedis
- Genus: Philonectria; Hara

Type species
- Philonectria variabilis Hara

Species
- P. carpinensis P. insignis P. meliolaceicola P. purandharensis P. ugandensis P. variabilis P. violacea

Genus of fungi

Philonectria is a genus of fungi in the class Dothideomycetes. The relationship of this taxon to other taxa within the class is unknown (incertae sedis).

== See also ==
- List of Dothideomycetes genera incertae sedis
