= Dermatodothella =

Scientific classification
- Kingdom: Fungi
- Division: Ascomycota
- Class: Dothideomycetes
- Family: Polystomellaceae
- Genus: Dermatodothella; Viégas

Type species
- Dermatodothella multiseptata Viégas

Genus of fungi

Dermatodothella is a genus of fungi in the class Dothideomycetes. The relationship of this taxon to other taxa within the class is unknown (incertae sedis). A monotypic genus, it contains the single species Dermatodothella multiseptata.

== See also ==
- List of Dothideomycetes genera incertae sedis
