= Caryosporella =

Scientific classification
- Kingdom: Fungi
- Division: Ascomycota
- Class: Dothideomycetes
- Subclass: incertae sedis
- Genus: Caryosporella; Kohlm.

Type species
- Caryosporella rhizophorae Kohlm.

Genus of fungi

Caryosporella is a genus of fungi in the class Dothideomycetes; according to the 2021 Outline of Ascomycota, the placement in this class is uncertain.

== See also ==
- List of Dothideomycetes taxa incertae sedis
