= Sijfert Hendrik Koorders =

Dutch botanist

- Born: 29 November 1863; Bandung, Indonesia
- Died: 16 November 1919 (aged 55); Jakarta, Indonesia (then called Batavia, Dutch East Indies)
- Spouse: Anna Koorders-Schumacher
- Scientific career
- Fields: Botany
- Author abbrev. (botany): Koord.

Sijfert Hendrik Koorders (1863 – 1919) was a Dutch botanist, who worked primarily on the flora of Java.

== Life ==
Koorders was born in Bandung, Dutch East Indies on 29 November 1863. In 1881 he graduated from the Hogere Burgerschool in Haarlem in the Netherlands. He then pursued advanced studies in forestry at the Royal Prussian Forestry and Hunting Academy in Neustadt Eberswalde, as well as attending classes at the University of Tübingen and the National Agricultural School in Wageningen. In 1885 he became a forest officer for the Dutch East Indies Forest Service in Java. In 1892 he became a curator at the Herbarium Bogoriense in Bogor, Java, Indonesia, where he deposited approximately 40,000 specimens. In 1912 he founded the Dutch East Indies Association for Nature Protection.

== Legacy ==
He is the authority for at least 648 taxa including: IPNI. List of plant names with authority Koord..

Several taxa are named in his honor including:

- Begonia koordersii Warb. ex L.B.Sm. & Wassh.
- Calamus koordersianus Becc.
- Freycinetia koordersiana Martelli
- Habenaria koordersii J.J.Sm.
- Koordersiella Höhn. (1909)
- Koordersiodendron pinnatum (Blanco) Merr.
- Myristica koordersii Warb.
- Pandanus koordersii Martelli
- Phreatia koordersii Rolfe
- Polyscias koordersii (Harms) Frodin
- Pomatocalpa koordersii Rolfe J.J.Sm.
- Quercus koordersii Seemen
- Heptapleurum koordersii (Harms) Lowry & G.M.Plunkett
- Trichoglottis koordersii Rolfe
