= Phaeopeltosphaeria =

Scientific classification
- Kingdom: Fungi
- Division: Ascomycota
- Class: Dothideomycetes
- Subclass: incertae sedis
- Genus: Phaeopeltosphaeria; Berl. & Peglion (1892)

Type species
- Phaeopeltosphaeria caudata Berl. & Peglion (1892)

Species
- P. caudata P. ferulina P. hainanensis P. indica P. irregularis P. panamensis P. pegani P. salsolae

Genus of fungi

Phaeopeltosphaeria is a genus of fungi in the class Dothideomycetes. The relationship of this taxon to other taxa within the class is unknown (incertae sedis).

== See also ==
- List of Dothideomycetes genera incertae sedis
