= Biciliopsis =

Scientific classification
- Kingdom: Fungi
- Division: Ascomycota
- Class: Dothideomycetes
- Subclass: incertae sedis
- Genus: Biciliopsis; Diederich

Type species
- Biciliopsis leptogiicola

Genus of fungi

Biciliopsis is a genus of fungi in the class Dothideomycetes. The relationship of this taxon to other taxa within the class is unknown (incertae sedis). A monotypic genus, it contains the single species Biciliopsis leptogiicola.

== See also ==
- List of Dothideomycetes genera incertae sedis
