= Macroventuria =

Scientific classification
- Kingdom: Fungi
- Division: Ascomycota
- Class: Dothideomycetes
- Subclass: incertae sedis
- Genus: Macroventuria; Aa

Type species
- Macroventuria anomochaeta Aa

Species
- M. anomochaeta M. wentii

Genus of fungi

Macroventuria is a genus of fungi in the class Dothideomycetes. The relationship of this taxon to other taxa within the class is unknown (incertae sedis).

== See also ==
- List of Dothideomycetes genera incertae sedis
