= Stuartella =

Scientific classification
- Kingdom: Fungi
- Division: Ascomycota
- Class: Dothideomycetes
- Subclass: incertae sedis
- Genus: Stuartella; Fabre

Type species
- Stuartella formosa Fabre

Species
- S. briardiana S. carlylei S. drimydis S. formosa S. fuckelii S. sulcata S. suttonii

Genus of fungi

Stuartella is a genus of fungi in the class Dothideomycetes. The relationship of this taxon to other taxa within the class is unknown (incertae sedis).

== See also ==
- List of Dothideomycetes genera incertae sedis
