= Mytilostoma =

Scientific classification
- Kingdom: Fungi
- Division: Ascomycota
- Class: Dothideomycetes
- Subclass: incertae sedis
- Genus: Mytilostoma; P.Karst. (1879)

Type species
- Mytilostoma deflectens P.Karst. (1879)

Genus of fungi

Mytilostoma is a genus of fungi in the class Dothideomycetes. The relationship of this taxon to other taxa within the class is unknown (incertae sedis).

== Species ==
- Mytilostoma curtum
- Mytilostoma deflectens
- Mytilostoma gregarium
- Mytilostoma hygrophilum
- Mytilostoma nobile
- Mytilostoma pachysporum
- Mytilostoma subcompressum

== See also ==
- List of Dothideomycetes genera incertae sedis
