= Homostegia =

Scientific classification
- Kingdom: Fungi
- Division: Ascomycota
- Class: Dothideomycetes
- Subclass: incertae sedis
- Genus: Homostegia; Fuckel (1870)

Type species
- Homostegia adusta Fuckel (1870)

Genus of fungi

Homostegia is a genus of fungi in the class Dothideomycetes. The relationship of this taxon to other taxa within the class is unknown (incertae sedis).

== Species ==
- Homostegia adusta
- Homostegia andina
- Homostegia asparagi
- Homostegia coscinodisca
- Homostegia dermatocarpi
- Homostegia derridis
- Homostegia durionis
- Homostegia durissima
- Homostegia glomerata
- Homostegia hertelii
- Homostegia ischaemi
- Homostegia kelseyi
- Homostegia leucosticta
- Homostegia lophiostomacea
- Homostegia magnoliae
- Homostegia minutissima
- Homostegia obscura
- Homostegia piggotii
- Homostegia polypodii
- Homostegia procedens
- Homostegia pterocarpi
- Homostegia stictarum
- Homostegia striola
- Homostegia symploci

== See also ==
- List of Dothideomycetes genera incertae sedis
