= Heptameria =

Scientific classification
- Kingdom: Fungi
- Division: Ascomycota
- Class: Dothideomycetes
- Subclass: incertae sedis
- Genus: Heptameria; Rehm & Thüm. (1879)

Type species
- Heptameria elegans Rehm & Thüm. (1879)

Species
- H. chilensis H. foliicola H. helichrysi H. mesaedema H. obesa H. thuemeniana

Genus of fungi

Heptameria is a genus of fungi in the class Dothideomycetes. The relationship of this taxon to other taxa within the class is unknown (incertae sedis).

== See also ==
- List of Dothideomycetes genera incertae sedis
