= Teichosporella =

Scientific classification
- Kingdom: Fungi
- Division: Ascomycota
- Class: Dothideomycetes
- Subclass: incertae sedis
- Genus: Teichosporella (Sacc.) Sacc.

Type species
- Teichosporella dura Sacc. 1895

Genus of fungi

Teichosporella is a genus of fungi in the class Dothideomycetes. The relationship of this taxon to other taxa within the class is unknown (incertae sedis). The genus was first described by Italian mycologist Pier Andrea Saccardo in 1895.

== Species ==
- T. acolioides
- T. africae
- T. arthonioides
- T. azaleae
- T. callimorpha
- T. cervariensis
- T. crebriseptata
- T. denudata
- T. dura
- T. edwiniae
- T. indica
- T. lantanae
- T. lonicerina
- T. montana
- T. negeriana
- T. obliqua
- T. oryzae
- T. pachyasca
- T. patellaris
- T. phellogena
- T. planiuscula
- T. rauzabagensis
- T. rostrata
- T. sanguinea
- T. subrostrata
- T. ziziphi

== See also ==
- List of Dothideomycetes genera incertae sedis
