= Allosoma =

Scientific classification
- Kingdom: Fungi
- Division: Ascomycota
- Class: Dothideomycetes
- Subclass: incertae sedis
- Genus: Allosoma; Syd.

Type species
- Allosoma cestri Syd.

Genus of fungi

Allosoma is a genus of fungi in the class Dothideomycetes. The relationship of this taxon to other taxa within the class is unknown (incertae sedis).

== Species ==
- Allosoma indica
- Allosoma indicum
- Allosoma quercifoliae

== See also ==
- List of Dothideomycetes genera incertae sedis
