= Grandigallia =

Scientific classification
- Kingdom: Fungi
- Division: Ascomycota
- Class: Dothideomycetes
- Subclass: incertae sedis
- Genus: Grandigallia; M.E.Barr, Hanlin, Cedeño, Parra & R.Hern. (1987)

Type species
- Grandigallia dictyospora M.E.Barr, Hanlin, Cedeño, Parra & R.Hern. (1987)

Genus of fungi

Grandigallia is a genus of fungi in the class Dothideomycetes. The relationship of this taxon to other taxa within the class is unknown (incertae sedis). A monotypic genus, it contains the single species Grandigallia dictyospora.

== See also ==
- List of Dothideomycetes genera incertae sedis
