= Microdothella =

Scientific classification
- Kingdom: Fungi
- Division: Ascomycota
- Class: Dothideomycetes
- Subclass: incertae sedis
- Genus: Microdothella; Syd. & P. Syd.

Type species
- Microdothella culmicola Syd. & P. Syd.

Species
- Microdothella caesalpiniae Microdothella culmicola Microdothella indica Microdothella piriformis Microdothella ramularis Microdothella theae

Genus of fungi

Microdothella is a genus of fungi in the class Dothideomycetes. The relationship of this taxon to other taxa within the class is unknown (incertae sedis).

== See also ==
- List of Dothideomycetes genera incertae sedis
