= Scolecobonaria =

Scientific classification
- Kingdom: Fungi
- Division: Ascomycota
- Class: Dothideomycetes
- Subclass: incertae sedis
- Genus: Scolecobonaria; Bat.

Type species
- Scolecobonaria filiformis (W. Yamam.) Bat.

Species
- S. filiformis S. lithocarpi

Genus of fungi

Scolecobonaria is a genus of fungi in the class Dothideomycetes. The relationship of this taxon to other taxa within the class is unknown (incertae sedis).

The genus name of Scolecobonaria is in honour of Lee Bonar (1891-1977), an American botanist and professor at the University of California, Berkeley.

== See also ==
- List of Dothideomycetes genera incertae sedis
