= Dothivalsaria =

Scientific classification
- Kingdom: Fungi
- Division: Ascomycota
- Class: Dothideomycetes
- Subclass: incertae sedis
- Genus: Dothivalsaria; Petr.

Genus of fungi

Dothivalsaria is a genus of fungi in the class Dothideomycetes. Since 2021, it has been considered incertae sedis within that class.

== See also ==
- List of Dothideomycetes taxa incertae sedis
