= Phaeoglaena =

Scientific classification
- Kingdom: Fungi
- Division: Ascomycota
- Class: Dothideomycetes
- Subclass: incertae sedis
- Genus: Phaeoglaena; Clem.

Genus of fungi

Phaeoglaena is a genus of fungi in the class Dothideomycetes. The relationship of this taxon to other taxa within the class is unknown (incertae sedis). The genus was first described by American plant ecologist Frederick Clements in 1909.

== See also ==
- List of Dothideomycetes genera incertae sedis
