= Roumegueria =

Scientific classification
- Kingdom: Fungi
- Division: Ascomycota
- Class: Dothideomycetes
- Subclass: incertae sedis
- Genus: Roumegueria (Sacc.) P. Henn.

Type species
- Roumegueria goudotii (Lév.) Sacc. ex Clem. & Shear

Genus of fungi

Roumegueria is a genus of fungi in the class Dothideomycetes. The relationship of this taxon to other taxa within the class is unknown (incertae sedis). This is a monotypic genus, containing the single species Roumegueria goudotii.

== See also ==
- List of Dothideomycetes genera incertae sedis
