= Pycnocarpon =

Scientific classification
- Kingdom: Fungi
- Division: Ascomycota
- Class: Dothideomycetes
- Subclass: incertae sedis
- Genus: Pycnocarpon; Theiss.

Type species
- Pycnocarpon magnificum Syd., P. Syd. & E.J. Butler

Species
- Pycnocarpon fimbriatum; Pycnocarpon leptospilum; Pycnocarpon magnificum; Pycnocarpon nodulosum; Pycnocarpon parashoreae

Genus of fungi

Pycnocarpon is a genus of fungi in the class Dothideomycetes and in the Asterinaceae family.

The relationship of this taxon to other taxa within the class is unknown (incertae sedis).

== See also ==
- List of Dothideomycetes genera incertae sedis
