= Mycodidymella =

Scientific classification
- Kingdom: Fungi
- Division: Ascomycota
- Class: Dothideomycetes
- Subclass: incertae sedis
- Genus: Mycodidymella; C.Z. Wei, Y. Haradfa & K. Katumoto

Type species
- Mycodidymella aesculi C.Z. Wei, Y. Harada & Katum.

Genus of fungi

Mycodidymella is a genus of fungi in the class Dothideomycetes. The relationship of this taxon to other taxa within the class is unknown (incertae sedis). A monotypic genus, it contains the single species Mycodidymella aesculi.

== See also ==
- List of Dothideomycetes genera incertae sedis
