= Phragmoscutella =

Scientific classification
- Kingdom: Fungi
- Division: Ascomycota
- Class: Dothideomycetes
- Subclass: incertae sedis
- Genus: Phragmoscutella; Woron. & Abramov ex Woron.

Type species
- Phragmoscutella abchasica Woron. & Abramov

Monotypic genus of fungi

Phragmoscutella is a genus of fungi in the class Dothideomycetes. The relationship of this taxon to other taxa within the class is unknown (incertae sedis). A monotypic genus, it contains the single species Phragmoscutella abchasica.

== See also ==
- List of Dothideomycetes genera incertae sedis
