= Tyrannosorus pinicola =

Scientific classification
- Kingdom: Fungi
- Division: Ascomycota
- Class: Dothideomycetes
- Order: incertae sedis
- Family: incertae sedis
- Genus: Tyrannosorus Untereiner & Malloch

Type species
- Tyrannosorus pinicola (Petrini & P.J. Fisher) Unter. & Malloch

Species of fungus

Tyrannosorus is a genus of fungi in the class Dothideomycetes. The relationship of this taxon to other taxa within the class is unknown (incertae sedis). A monotypic genus, it contains the single species Tyrannosorus pinicola. The genus was first formally described by Untereiner & Malloch, although the species was previously described by others. It takes its name, meaning "despotic heap", from its ascomata, which have long and sharp spines, presumably to deter small animals.

T. pinicola's anamorph was previously falsely described as a member of the Helicodendron genus due to its helical conidia, which coiled 5-6 times, or less so in older cultures. T. pinicola may have convergently evolved similar spore morphology to Helicodendron due to occupying an aero-aquatic niche, where the helicoid spores trap an air pocket that enables flotation of spores in aquatic environments.

== Description ==
T. pinicola's ascomata are dark-brown to black, and occur solitarily. The ascomata are between pear-shaped (pyriform) and egg-shaped (ovate). They have ostioles and sharp-pointed setae, which give the genus Tyrannosorus its name. The asci are enclosed in a double wall (bitunicate), the inner of which is thickened, and taper towards the base. The ascospores come in pairs of cells and are brown with indistinct striae.

== See also ==
- List of Dothideomycetes genera incertae sedis
