= Globoa =

Scientific classification
- Kingdom: Fungi
- Division: Ascomycota
- Class: Dothideomycetes
- Subclass: incertae sedis
- Genus: Globoa; Bat. & H.Maia (1962)

Type species
- Globoa toddaliae Bat. & H.Maia (1962)

Species
- Globoa hugueninii Globoa toddaliae

Genus of fungi

Globoa is a genus of fungi in the class Dothideomycetes. The relationship of this taxon to other taxa within the class is unknown (incertae sedis).

== See also ==
- List of Dothideomycetes genera incertae sedis
