= Thyrospora =

Scientific classification
- Kingdom: Fungi
- Division: Ascomycota
- Class: Dothideomycetes
- Subclass: incertae sedis
- Genus: Thyrospora; Kirschst.

Type species
- Thyrospora calosperma Kirschst.

Species
- T. astragali T. calosperma T. cannabis T. gossypiicola

Genus of fungi

Thyrospora is a genus of fungi in the class Dothideomycetes. The relationship of this taxon to other taxa within the class is unknown (incertae sedis).

== See also ==
- List of Dothideomycetes genera incertae sedis
