= Didymopleella =

Scientific classification
- Kingdom: Fungi
- Division: Ascomycota
- Class: Dothideomycetes
- Subclass: incertae sedis
- Genus: Didymopleella; Munk (1953)

Type species
- Didymopleella cladii (P.Larsen & Munk) Munk (1953)

Species
- D. ammophila D. cladii

Genus of fungi

Didymopleella is a genus of fungi in the class Dothideomycetes. The relationship of this taxon to other taxa within the class is unknown (incertae sedis).

== See also ==
- List of Dothideomycetes genera incertae sedis
