= Thalassoascus =

Scientific classification
- Kingdom: Fungi
- Division: Ascomycota
- Class: Dothideomycetes
- Subclass: incertae sedis
- Genus: Thalassoascus; Ollivier

Type species
- Thalassoascus tregoubovii Ollivier

Species
- T. cystoseirae T. lessoniae T. tregoubovii

Genus of fungi

Thalassoascus is a genus of fungi in the class Dothideomycetes. The relationship of this taxon to other taxa within the class is unknown (incertae sedis).

== See also ==
- List of Dothideomycetes genera incertae sedis
