= Gibberidea =

Scientific classification
- Kingdom: Fungi
- Division: Ascomycota
- Class: Dothideomycetes
- Subclass: incertae sedis
- Genus: Gibberidea; Fuckel (1870)

Type species
- Gibberidea visci Fuckel (1870)

Genus of fungi

Gibberidea is a genus of fungi in the class Dothideomycetes. The relationship of this taxon to other taxa within the class is unknown (incertae sedis). The genus was named by German mycologist Karl Wilhelm Gottlieb Leopold Fuckel in 1870.

== Species ==
- Gibberidea abutilonis
- Gibberidea alnicola
- Gibberidea andina
- Gibberidea artemisiae
- Gibberidea cinerea
- Gibberidea heliopsidis
- Gibberidea lenarsii
- Gibberidea obducens
- Gibberidea ribesia
- Gibberidea visci
- Gibberidea zingiberacearum
- Gibberidea ziziphi

== See also ==
- List of Dothideomycetes genera incertae sedis
