= Pleostigma =

Scientific classification
- Kingdom: Fungi
- Division: Ascomycota
- Class: Dothideomycetes
- Subclass: incertae sedis
- Genus: Pleostigma; Kirschst.

Species
- P. fibrincolum P. jungermannicola P. lithospermi P. malacodermum P. marchicum P. moelleriellae P. piceae P. quercinum P. xenochaeta

Genus of fungi

Pleostigma is a genus of fungi in the class Dothideomycetes. The relationship of this taxon to other taxa within the class is unknown (incertae sedis).

== See also ==
- List of Dothideomycetes genera incertae sedis
