= Extrusothecium =

Scientific classification
- Kingdom: Fungi
- Division: Ascomycota
- Class: Dothideomycetes
- Subclass: incertae sedis
- Genus: Extrusothecium; Matsush. (1996)

Type species
- Extrusothecium caffrum Matsush. (1996)

Species
- E. caffrum E. kobense

Genus of fungi

Extrusothecium is a genus of fungi in the class Dothideomycetes. The relationship of this taxon to other taxa within the class is unknown (incertae sedis).

== See also ==
- List of Dothideomycetes genera incertae sedis
