= Kusanobotrys =

Scientific classification
- Kingdom: Fungi
- Division: Ascomycota
- Class: Dothideomycetes
- Subclass: incertae sedis
- Genus: Kusanobotrys; Henn. (1904)

Type species
- Kusanobotrys bambusae Henn. (1904)

Species
- K. amomi K. bambusae

Genus of fungi

Kusanobotrys is a genus of fungi in the class Dothideomycetes. The relationship of this taxon to other taxa within the class is unknown (incertae sedis).

== See also ==
- List of Dothideomycetes genera incertae sedis
