= Lembosiopeltis =

Scientific classification
- Kingdom: Fungi
- Division: Ascomycota
- Class: Dothideomycetes
- Subclass: incertae sedis
- Genus: Lembosiopeltis; Bat. & J.L. Bezerra

Type species
- Lembosiopeltis nectandrae Bat. & J.L. Bezerra

Species
- Lembosiopeltis lineares Lembosiopeltis nectandrae

Genus of fungi

Lembosiopeltis is a genus of fungi in the class Dothideomycetes. The relationship of this taxon to other taxa within the class is unknown (incertae sedis).

== See also ==
- List of Dothideomycetes genera incertae sedis
