= Gloeodiscus =

Scientific classification
- Kingdom: Fungi
- Division: Ascomycota
- Class: Dothideomycetes
- Subclass: incertae sedis
- Genus: Gloeodiscus; Dennis (1961)

Type species
- Gloeodiscus nigrorufus (Berk.) Dennis (1961)

Genus of fungi

Gloeodiscus is a genus of fungi in the class Dothideomycetes. The relationship of this taxon to other taxa within the class is unknown (incertae sedis). Also, the placement of this genus within the Dothideomycetes is uncertain. A monotypic genus, it contains the single species Gloeodiscus nigrorufus.

== See also ==
- List of Dothideomycetes genera incertae sedis
