= Lopholeptosphaeria =

Scientific classification
- Kingdom: Fungi
- Division: Ascomycota
- Class: Dothideomycetes
- Order: Dothideales
- Genus: lopholeptosphaeria Sousa da Câmara (1932)

Genus of fungi

Lopholeptosphaeria is a genus of fungi in the class Dothideomycetes. The familial placement of this taxon is unknown (incertae sedis). The genus was circumscribed by Manuel Emmanuele de Sousa da Câmara in 1932.

== See also ==
- List of Dothideomycetes genera incertae sedis
