= Bryorella =

Scientific classification
- Kingdom: Fungi
- Division: Ascomycota
- Class: Dothideomycetes
- Subclass: incertae sedis
- Genus: Bryorella; Döbbeler

Type species
- Bryorella acrogena Döbbeler

Genus of fungi

Bryorella is a genus of fungi in the class Dothideomycetes. The relationship of this taxon to other taxa within the class is unknown (incertae sedis).

== Species ==
- Bryorella acrogena
- Bryorella complanata
- Bryorella compressa
- Bryorella conspecta
- Bryorella crassitecta
- Bryorella cryptocarpa
- Bryorella erumpens
- Bryorella gregaria
- Bryorella imitans
- Bryorella marginis
- Bryorella punctiformis
- Bryorella retiformis
- Bryorella semi-immersa

== See also ==
- List of Dothideomycetes genera incertae sedis
