= Plejobolus =

Scientific classification
- Kingdom: Fungi
- Division: Ascomycota
- Class: Dothideomycetes
- Subclass: incertae sedis
- Genus: Plejobolus (E. Bommer, M. Rousseau & Sacc.) O.E. Erikss.

Type species
- Plejobolus arenarius (E. Bommer, M. Rousseau & Sacc.) O.E. Erikss.

Species
- P. arenarius P. erikssonii P. nigromaculatus

Genus of fungi

Plejobolus is a genus of fungi in the class Dothideomycetes. The relationship of this taxon to other taxa within the class is unknown (incertae sedis).

== See also ==
- List of Dothideomycetes genera incertae sedis
