= Argynna =

Scientific classification
- Kingdom: Fungi
- Division: Ascomycota
- Class: Dothideomycetes
- Subclass: incertae sedis
- Genus: Argynna; Morgan

Type species
- Argynna polyhedron (Schwein.) Morgan

Genus of fungi

Argynna is a genus of fungi within the Argynnaceae family. This is a monotypic genus, containing the single species Argynna polyhedron.
