= Pseudonitschkia =

Scientific classification
- Kingdom: Fungi
- Division: Ascomycota
- Class: Dothideomycetes
- Subclass: incertae sedis
- Genus: Pseudonitschkia; Coppins & S.Y.Kondr. (1995)

Type species
- Pseudonitschkia parmotrematis Coppins & S.Y.Kondr. (1995)

Genus of fungi

Pseudonitschkia is a genus of fungi in the class Dothideomycetes. The relationship of this taxon to other taxa within the class is unknown (incertae sedis). A monotypic genus, it contains the single species Pseudonitschkia parmotrematis. This was first found growing on rock in Venezuela and the holotype specimen is in the collection of the Natural History Museum, London.

== See also ==
- List of Dothideomycetes genera incertae sedis
