= Chaetoscutula =

Scientific classification
- Kingdom: Fungi
- Division: Ascomycota
- Class: Dothideomycetes
- Subclass: incertae sedis
- Genus: Chaetoscutula

Type species
- Chaetoscutula juniperi E.Müll. (1959)

Genus of fungi

Chaetoscutula is a fungal genus in the class Dothideomycetes. The relationship of this taxon to other taxa within the class is unknown (incertae sedis). A monotypic genus, it contains the single species Chaetoscutula juniperi. The genus was circumscribed by Emil Müller in 1959.

== See also ==
- List of Dothideomycetes genera incertae sedis
