= Brefeldiella =

Scientific classification
- Kingdom: Fungi
- Division: Ascomycota
- Class: Dothideomycetes
- Subclass: incertae sedis
- Genus: Brefeldiella; Speg.

Type species
- Brefeldiella brasiliensis Speg.

Species
- B. brasiliensis B. chilensis B. myrceugeniae B. subcuticulosa

Genus of fungi

Brefeldiella is a genus of fungi in the class Dothideomycetes. The relationship of this taxon to other taxa within the class is unknown (incertae sedis).

== See also ==
- List of Dothideomycetes genera incertae sedis
