= Dawsomyces =

Scientific classification
- Kingdom: Fungi
- Division: Ascomycota
- Class: Dothideomycetes
- Subclass: incertae sedis
- Genus: Dawsomyces; Döbbeler (1981)

Type species
- Dawsomyces mirabilis Döbbeler (1981)

Species
- D. mirabilis D. subinvisibilis

Genus of fungi

Dawsomyces is a genus of fungi in the class Dothideomycetes. The relationship of this taxon to other taxa within the class is unknown (incertae sedis).

== See also ==
- List of Dothideomycetes genera incertae sedis
