= Mycocryptospora =

Scientific classification
- Kingdom: Fungi
- Division: Ascomycota
- Class: Dothideomycetes
- Subclass: incertae sedis
- Genus: Mycocryptospora; J. Reid & C. Booth

Type species
- Mycocryptospora anthostomoides (Rehm) J. Reid & C. Booth

Genus of fungi

Mycocryptospora is a genus of fungi in the class Dothideomycetes. The relationship of this taxon to other taxa within the class is unknown (incertae sedis). A monotypic genus, it contains the single species Mycocryptospora anthostomoides.

== See also ==
- List of Dothideomycetes genera incertae sedis
