= Moriolomyces =

Scientific classification
- Kingdom: Fungi
- Division: Ascomycota
- Class: Dothideomycetes
- Subclass: incertae sedis
- Genus: Moriolomyces; Cif. & Tomas.

Type species
- Moriolomyces descensae Cif. & Tomas.

Genus of fungi

Moriolomyces is a genus of fungi in the class Dothideomycetes. The relationship of this taxon to other taxa within the class is unknown (incertae sedis). This is a monotypic genus, containing the single species Moriolomyces descensae.

== See also ==
- List of Dothideomycetes genera incertae sedis
