= Yoshinagella =

Scientific classification
- Kingdom: Fungi
- Division: Ascomycota
- Class: Dothideomycetes
- Subclass: incertae sedis
- Genus: Yoshinagella; Höhn.

Type species
- Yoshinagella japonica Höhn.

Species
- Y. japonica Y. phyllostachydis Y. polymorpha var. pauciseta Y. polymorpha var. polymorpha

Genus of fungi

Yoshinagella is a genus of fungi in the class Dothideomycetes. The relationship of this taxon to other taxa within the class is unknown (incertae sedis).

== See also ==
- List of Dothideomycetes genera incertae sedis
