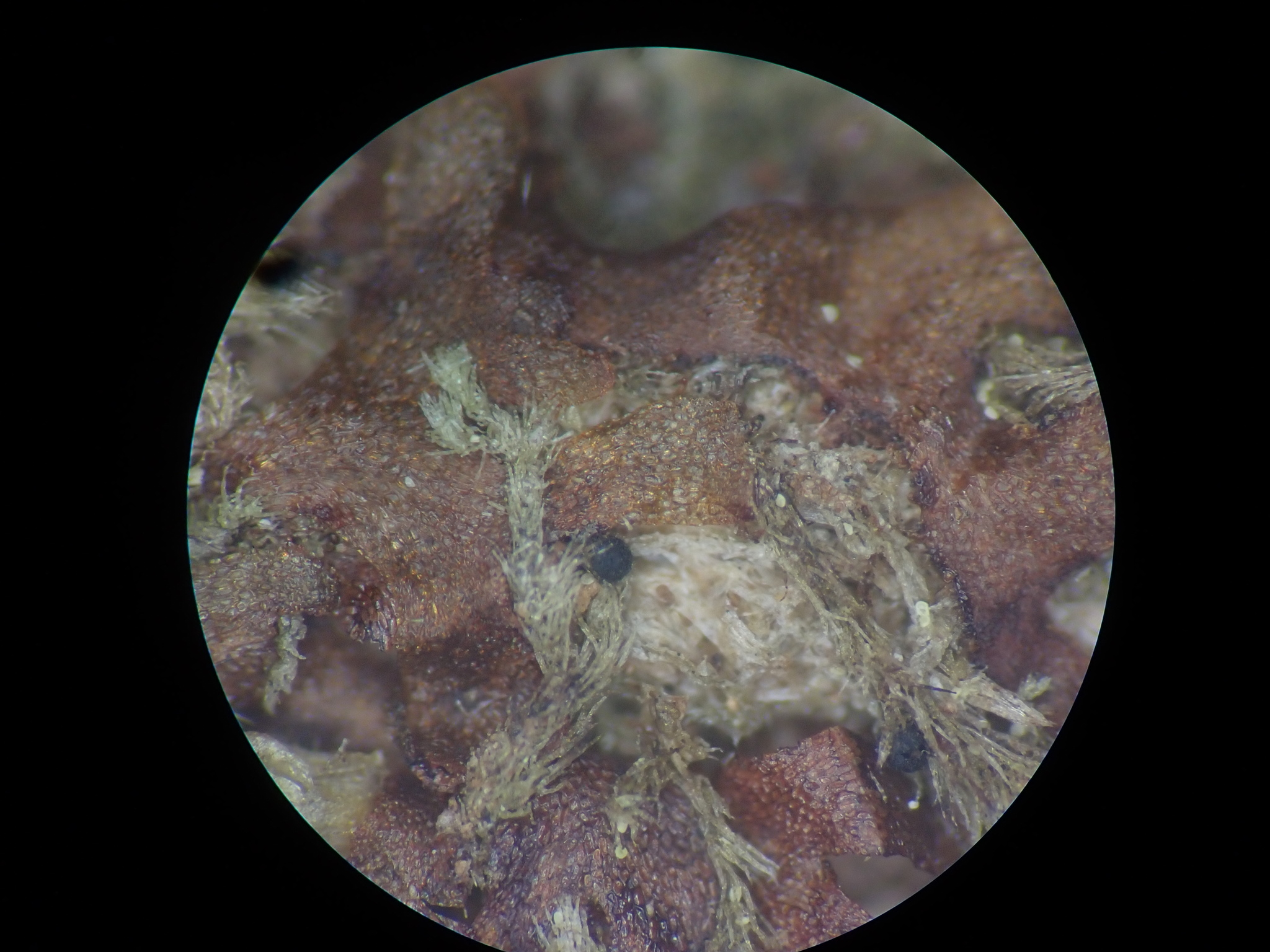

Scientific classification
- Kingdom: Fungi
- Division: Ascomycota
- Class: Dothideomycetes
- Subclass: incertae sedis
- Genus: Bryosphaeria; Döbbeler

Type species
- Bryosphaeria cinclidoti (Racov.) Döbbeler

= Bryosphaeria =

Genus of fungi

Bryosphaeria is a genus of fungi in the class Dothideomycetes. The relationship of this taxon to other taxa within the class is unknown (incertae sedis).

== Species ==
- Bryosphaeria brevicollis
- Bryosphaeria bryophila
- Bryosphaeria cinclidoti
- Bryosphaeria echinoidea
- Bryosphaeria epibrya
- Bryosphaeria megaspora
- Bryosphaeria pohliae
- Bryosphaeria quinqueseptata
- Bryosphaeria setifera

== See also ==
- List of Dothideomycetes genera incertae sedis
