= Helicascus =

Scientific classification
- Kingdom: Fungi
- Division: Ascomycota
- Class: Dothideomycetes
- Subclass: incertae sedis
- Genus: Helicascus; Kohlm. (1969)

Type species
- Helicascus kanaloanus Kohlm. (1969)

Species
- H. kanaloanus H. nypae

Genus of fungi

Helicascus is a genus of fungi in the class Dothideomycetes. The relationship of this taxon to other taxa within the class is unknown (incertae sedis).

== See also ==
- List of Dothideomycetes genera incertae sedis
