= Pyrenochium =

Scientific classification
- Kingdom: Fungi
- Division: Ascomycota
- Class: Dothideomycetes
- Subclass: incertae sedis
- Genus: Pyrenochium; Link

Type species
- Pyrenochium pini Link

Genus of fungi

Pyrenochium is a genus of fungi in the class Dothideomycetes. The relationship of this taxon to other taxa within the class is unknown (incertae sedis). Also, the placement of this genus within the Dothideomycetes is uncertain. A monotypic genus, it contains the single species Pyrenochium pini.

== See also ==
- List of Dothideomycetes genera incertae sedis
