= Lidophia =

Scientific classification
- Domain: Eukaryota
- Kingdom: Fungi
- Division: Ascomycota
- Class: Dothideomycetes
- Order: Dothideales
- Genus: Lidophia; J. Walker & B. Sutton

Type species
- Lidophia graminis (Sacc.) J. Walker & B. Sutton

Genus of fungi

Lidophia is a genus of fungi in the class Dothideomycetes. The relationship of this taxon to other taxa within the class is unknown (incertae sedis). It is a monotypic genus, containing the single species Lidophia graminis.

== See also ==
- List of Dothideomycetes genera incertae sedis
