= Massariola =

Scientific classification
- Kingdom: Fungi
- Division: Ascomycota
- Class: Dothideomycetes
- Subclass: incertae sedis
- Genus: Massariola; Füisting

Genus of fungi

Massariola is a genus of fungi in the class Dothideomycetes. The relationship of this taxon to other taxa within the class is unknown (incertae sedis). The genus was first described by German lichenologist Wilhelm Füisting in 1868.

The genus name of Massariola is in honour of Giuseppe Filippo Massara (1792-1839), who was an Italian doctor and botanist, working in Sondrio.

The genus was circumscribed by Wilhelm Füisting in Bot. Zeitung (Berlin) vol.26 on page 417 in 1868.

== See also ==
- List of Dothideomycetes genera incertae sedis
