= Microcyclella =

Scientific classification
- Kingdom: Fungi
- Division: Ascomycota
- Class: Dothideomycetes
- Subclass: incertae sedis
- Genus: Microcyclella; Theiss.

Type species
- Microcyclella nervisequia (Höhn.) Theiss.

Species
- M. disciformis M. nervisequia

Genus of fungi

Microcyclella is a genus of fungi in the class Dothideomycetes. The relationship of this taxon to other taxa within the class is unknown (incertae sedis).

== See also ==
- List of Dothideomycetes genera incertae sedis
