= Comesella =

Scientific classification
- Kingdom: Fungi
- Division: Ascomycota
- Class: Dothideomycetes
- Subclass: incertae sedis
- Genus: Comesella; Speg.

Type species
- Comesella anomala (Berk. & M.A. Curtis) Speg.

Genus of fungi

Comesella is a genus of fungi in the class Dothideomycetes. The relationship of this taxon to other taxa within the class is unknown (incertae sedis). Also, the placement of this genus within the Dothideomycetes is uncertain. A monotypic genus, it contains the single species Comesella anomala.

== See also ==
- List of Dothideomycetes genera incertae sedis
