= Thyridaria =

Scientific classification
- Kingdom: Fungi
- Division: Ascomycota
- Class: Dothideomycetes
- Subclass: incertae sedis
- Genus: Thyridaria; Sacc.

Type species
- Thyridaria incrustans Sacc.

Genus of fungi

Thyridaria is a genus of fungi in the class Dothideomycetes. The relationship of this taxon to other taxa within the class is unknown (incertae sedis). Also, the placement of this genus within the Dothideomycetes is uncertain. The genus was first described by Pier Andrea Saccardo in 1875.

== See also ==
- List of Dothideomycetes genera incertae sedis
