= Phaeocyrtidula =

Scientific classification
- Kingdom: Fungi
- Division: Ascomycota
- Class: Dothideomycetes
- Subclass: incertae sedis
- Genus: Phaeocyrtidula; Vain. (1921)

Species
- P. pinea P. rhypontoides

Genus of fungi

Phaeocyrtidula is a genus of fungi in the class Dothideomycetes. The relationship of this taxon to other taxa within the class is unknown (incertae sedis). Also, the placement of this genus within the Dothideomycetes is uncertain.

== See also ==
- List of Dothideomycetes genera incertae sedis
