= Pleiostomellina =

Scientific classification
- Kingdom: Fungi
- Division: Ascomycota
- Class: Dothideomycetes
- Subclass: incertae sedis
- Genus: Pleiostomellina; Bat., J.L. Bezerra & H. Maia

Type species
- Pleiostomellina pernambucensis Bat., J.L. Bezerra & Cavalc.

Genus of fungi

Pleiostomellina is a genus of fungi in the class Dothideomycetes. The relationship of this taxon to other taxa within the class is unknown (incertae sedis). A monotypic genus, it contains the single species Pleiostomellina pernambucensis.

== See also ==
- List of Dothideomycetes genera incertae sedis
