= Belizeana =

Scientific classification
- Kingdom: Fungi
- Division: Ascomycota
- Class: Dothideomycetes
- Subclass: incertae sedis
- Genus: Belizeana; Kohlm. & Volkm.

Type species
- Belizeana tuberculata Kohlm. & Volkm.-Kohlm.

Genus of fungi

Belizeana is a genus of fungi in the class Dothideomycetes. The relationship of this taxon to other taxa within the class is unknown (incertae sedis). This is a monotypic genus, consisting of the single species Belizeana tuberculata.

== See also ==
- List of Dothideomycetes genera incertae sedis
