= Lanatosphaera =

Scientific classification
- Kingdom: Fungi
- Division: Ascomycota
- Class: Dothideomycetes
- Subclass: incertae sedis
- Genus: Lanatosphaera; Matzer

Type species
- Lanatosphaera porinicola Matzer

Species
- L. dimerellae L. porinicola

Genus of fungi

Lanatosphaera is a genus of fungi in the class Dothideomycetes. The relationship of this taxon to other taxa within the class is unknown (incertae sedis).

== See also ==
- List of Dothideomycetes genera incertae sedis
