= Lepidopterella =

Scientific classification
- Kingdom: Fungi
- Division: Ascomycota
- Class: Dothideomycetes
- Family: Argynnaceae
- Genus: Lepidopterella; Shearer & J.L. Crane

Type species
- Lepidopterella palustris Shearer & J.L. Crane

Species
- Lepidopterella palustris Lepidopterella tangerina

Genus of fungi

Lepidopterella is a genus of fungi within the Argynnaceae family.
