= Thelenidia =

Scientific classification
- Kingdom: Fungi
- Division: Ascomycota
- Class: incertae sedis
- Order: incertae sedis
- Family: incertae sedis
- Genus: Thelenidia; Nyl. (1886)
- Species: T. monosporella

Binomial name
- Thelenidia monosporella Nyl. (1886)

Synonyms
- Genus: Thelenidiomyces Cif. & Tomas. (1953); Species: Verrucaria monosporella (Nyl.) Hue (1888); Thelenidiomyces monosporellae Cif. & Tomas. (1954)

Single-species fungal genus

Thelenidia is a fungal genus in the division Ascomycota. It has not been placed into a specific family, order or class, and its relationship to other Ascomycota genera remains uncertain. A monospecific genus, it contains the single species Thelenidia monosporella, a crustose lichen. This unusual lichen is distinguished by the presence of algal cells scattered within its spore-bearing layer, a characteristic that is extremely rare among lichen-forming fungi. It has a disjunct distribution, being known only from calcareous soil in Switzerland and from spray-moistened stones in high-Arctic Greenland.

== Taxonomy ==
William Nylander described the species in 1886 from material collected on soil near Rifferswil, Switzerland. In his Latin protologue he characterised a very thin, whitish-grey thallus with the fruiting bodies buried in small wart-like swellings of the thallus; when moist they are nearly spherical (globose), with only a faint surface pore (the ostiole) visible. Nylander compared the species with Thelenella modesta but distinguished it by its one-spored asci, simple spores, and a lichenised thallus. He also remarked that algal cells occur around the fruiting body and, more unusually, are sometimes scattered among the paraphyses in the hymenium—calling it "a minute but distinctive lichen" and adding that he had drafted the description about a decade earlier.

In a later study, Topham and Swinscow examined Nylander's specimens held in Helsinki and selected one packet (H no. 4062) as the lectotype (a single "name-bearing" specimen chosen from the original material when no holotype was fixed), with duplicate material from packet 4061 placed in the Natural History Museum, London (BM). Their work emphasised that the presence of algal cells in the hymenium is the defining character of Thelenidia.

== Description ==
Thelenidia monosporella forms a very thin, film-like thallus that ranges from greyish-green to yellowish-green. In the Swiss type material it appears smooth on calcareous earth, whereas a Greenland collection shows a slightly nodular film over silt-coated stone. The algal partner (photobiont) has bright green, spherical cells about 5–10 micrometres (μm) across. The fruiting bodies are immersed in the thallus and only the tiny pore (the ostiole) is visible at the surface; there is no dark outer coating (involucrellum). Inside, the spore-bearing layer (the hymenium) contains scattered algal cells among the thin, branched tissue threads (pseudoparaphyses). This arrangement (algal cells occurring within the hymenium) is unusual among loculoascomycete lichens (a group of sac fungi in which the spore sacs develop in small cavities). The asci are bitunicate (double-walled), 50–80 × 15–30 μm with a slightly thickened apex, and each ascus contains a single colourless spore. The spores are mostly oblong with rounded ends, often with a slight waist at the middle, measuring 40–55 × 15–20 (less often up to 30) μm.

== Distribution and habitat ==
After its original discovery on calcareous earth in Switzerland, T. monosporella was found again in 1968 in high-Arctic east Greenland (Mestersvig area, about 500 m elevation). There it grew on silt-coated stones embedded in shingle behind a small waterfall, where spray kept the surface continually moist despite the otherwise severe climate and low precipitation; local föhn conditions create relatively favourable microclimates on south-facing slopes. The contrasting Swiss and Greenland sites show that the species can occupy both dry calcareous soil and intermittently inundated stone, with the thallus appearance varying between these conditions.

== See also ==
- List of Ascomycota genera incertae sedis
