= Ascominuta =

Scientific classification
- Kingdom: Fungi
- Division: Ascomycota
- Class: Dothideomycetes
- Subclass: incertae sedis
- Genus: Ascominuta; Ranghoo & K.D. Hyde

Type species
- Ascominuta lignicola Ranghoo & K.D. Hyde

Genus of fungi

Ascominuta is a genus of fungi in the class Dothideomycetes. The relationship of this taxon to other taxa within the class is unknown (incertae sedis). This is a monotypic genus, consisting of the single species Ascominuta lignicola.

== See also ==
- List of Dothideomycetes genera incertae sedis
