= Calyptra (fungus) =

Scientific classification
- Kingdom: Fungi
- Division: Ascomycota
- Class: Dothideomycetes
- Family: incertae sedis
- Genus: Calyptra; Theiss. & Syd. (1918)

Type species
- Calyptra cordobensis (Speg.) Theiss. & Syd. (1918)

Species
- Calyptra capnoides; Calyptra cordobensis; Calyptra plumeriae; Calyptra robinsonii; Calyptra tonduzii

Genus of fungi

Calyptra is a genus of fungi in the class Dothideomycetes. The relationship of this taxon to other taxa within the class is unknown (incertae sedis).

== See also ==
- List of Dothideomycetes taxa incertae sedis
