= Epiphegia =

Scientific classification
- Kingdom: Fungi
- Division: Ascomycota
- Class: Dothideomycetes
- Subclass: incertae sedis
- Genus: Epiphegia; Nitschke ex G.H. Otth

Type species
- Epiphegia alni G.H. Otth

Genus of fungi

Epiphegia is a monotypic genus of fungi, that was originally placed in the family Lophiostomataceae. It only contains one known species, Epiphegia microcarpa (Fuckel) Aptroot (1998) that is currently placed as incertae sedis within the Dothideomycetes class.

Former species include Epiphegia alni Nitschke ex G.H. Otth (1871) now Epiphegia microcarpa.
