= Ascoporiaceae =

Scientific classification
- Kingdom: Fungi
- Division: Ascomycota
- Class: Dothideomycetes
- Subclass: incertae sedis
- Family: Ascoporiaceae; Kutorga & D.Hawksw. (1997)

Type genus
- Ascoporia Samuels & A.I.Romero (1993)

Family of fungi

The Ascoporiaceae are a family of fungi with an uncertain taxonomic placement in the class Dothideomycetes, the division Ascomycetes, and the kingdom fungi.
