= Rosenscheldia =

Scientific classification
- Kingdom: Fungi
- Division: Ascomycota
- Class: Dothideomycetes
- Subclass: incertae sedis
- Genus: Rosenscheldia; Speg.

Type species
- Rosenscheldia paraguaya Speg.

Species
- R. abundans R. brenckleana R. caulincola R. heliopsidis R. horridula R. lycopi R. paraguaya

Genus of fungi

Rosenscheldia is a genus of fungi in the class Dothideomycetes. The relationship of this taxon to other taxa within the class is unknown (incertae sedis).

== See also ==
- List of Dothideomycetes genera incertae sedis
