= Polystomellaceae =

Scientific classification
- Kingdom: Fungi
- Division: Ascomycota
- Class: Dothideomycetes
- Subclass: incertae sedis
- Family: Polystomellaceae; Theiss. & H. Syd., 1915

Type genus
- Polystomella Speg., 1888

Family of fungi

The Polystomellaceae are a family of fungi with an uncertain taxonomic placement in the class Dothideomycetes.

GBIF lists the following accepted genera;

- Coscinopeltis (1)
- Dermatodothella Viégas, 1944 (1)
- Dothidella Speg., 1880 (36)
- Dothithyriella F.von Höhnel, 1918 (1)
- Marchalia P.A.Saccardo, 1889 (1)
- Munkiella Spegazzini, 1885 (1)
- Parastigmatea Doidge, 1921 (7)
- Pluriporus F.Stevens & R.W.Ryan (1)
- Polystomella (6)

Note: Figures in brackets = how many species per genus
