= Mesnieraceae =

Scientific classification
- Kingdom: Fungi
- Division: Ascomycota
- Class: Dothideomycetes
- Subclass: incertae sedis
- Family: Mesnieraceae; Arx & E. Müll., 1975

Type genus
- Mesniera Sacc. & P. Syd., 1902

Family of fungi

The Mesnieraceae are a family of fungi with an uncertain taxonomic placement in the class Dothideomycetes.
