= Meliolinaceae =

Scientific classification
- Kingdom: Fungi
- Division: Ascomycota
- Class: Dothideomycetes
- Subclass: incertae sedis
- Family: Meliolinaceae; S. Hughes, 1993

Type genus
- Meliolina Syd. & P. Syd., 1914

Family of fungi

The Meliolinaceae are a family of fungi with an uncertain taxonomic placement in the class Dothideomycetes.
