= Argynnaceae =

Scientific classification
- Kingdom: Fungi
- Division: Ascomycota
- Class: Dothideomycetes
- Subclass: incertae sedis
- Family: Argynnaceae; Shearer & J.L. Crane

Type genus
- Argynna Morgan

Genera
- Argynna; Lepidopterella

Family of fungi

The Argynnaceae are a family of fungi with an uncertain taxonomic placement in the class Dothideomycetes.
