= Parodiellaceae =

Scientific classification
- Kingdom: Fungi
- Division: Ascomycota
- Class: Dothideomycetes
- Order: Pleosporales
- Family: Parodiellaceae; Theiss. & Syd. ex M.E.Barr (1987)

Type genus
- Parodiella Speg. (1880)

Family of fungi

The Parodiellaceae are a family of fungi with an uncertain taxonomic placement in the class Dothideomycetes. It contains the single genus Parodiella, which has four species.
