= Globulina (fungus) =

Scientific classification
- Kingdom: Fungi
- Division: Ascomycota
- Class: Dothideomycetes
- Subclass: incertae sedis
- Genus: Globulina; Speg. (1888)

Type species
- Globulina erisyphoides Speg. (1888)

Genus of fungi

Globulina is a genus of fungi in the class Dothideomycetes. The relationship of this taxon to other taxa within the class is unknown (incertae sedis).

== Species ==
- Globulina aberrans
- Globulina antennariae
- Globulina astragali
- Globulina carpinacea
- Globulina cejpi
- Globulina corcontica
- Globulina dura
- Globulina duriuscula
- Globulina erisyphoides
- Globulina glabra
- Globulina ingae
- Globulina laricina
- Globulina leporina
- Globulina lupini
- Globulina martialis
- Globulina microspora
- Globulina piniseda
- Globulina quercina
- Globulina ruborum
- Globulina sarothamni
- Globulina saxifragae
- Globulina trichocarpa
- Globulina urticae

== See also ==
- List of Dothideomycetes genera incertae sedis
