= Englerulaceae =

Scientific classification
- Kingdom: Fungi
- Division: Ascomycota
- Class: Dothideomycetes
- Subclass: Dothideomycetidae
- Family: Englerulaceae; Henn. (1904)

Type genus
- Englerula Henn. (1904)

Genera
- Capnodiastrum; Clypeolella; Coniosporiella; Diathrypton; Englerula; Englerulella; Goosia; Linotexis; Mitteriella; Parenglerula; Questieria; Questieriella; Rhizotexis; Rhytidenglerula; Sarcinella; Schiffnerula; Thrauste

Family of fungi

The Englerulaceae are a family of fungi with an uncertain taxonomic placement in the class Dothideomycetes.

The genre names of Englerula and Englerulella are in honour of Heinrich Gustav Adolf Engler (1844 – 1930), who was a German botanist. He is notable for his work on plant taxonomy and phytogeography.
