= Franz Xaver Rudolf von Höhnel =

Austrian bryologist, mycologist, and algologist

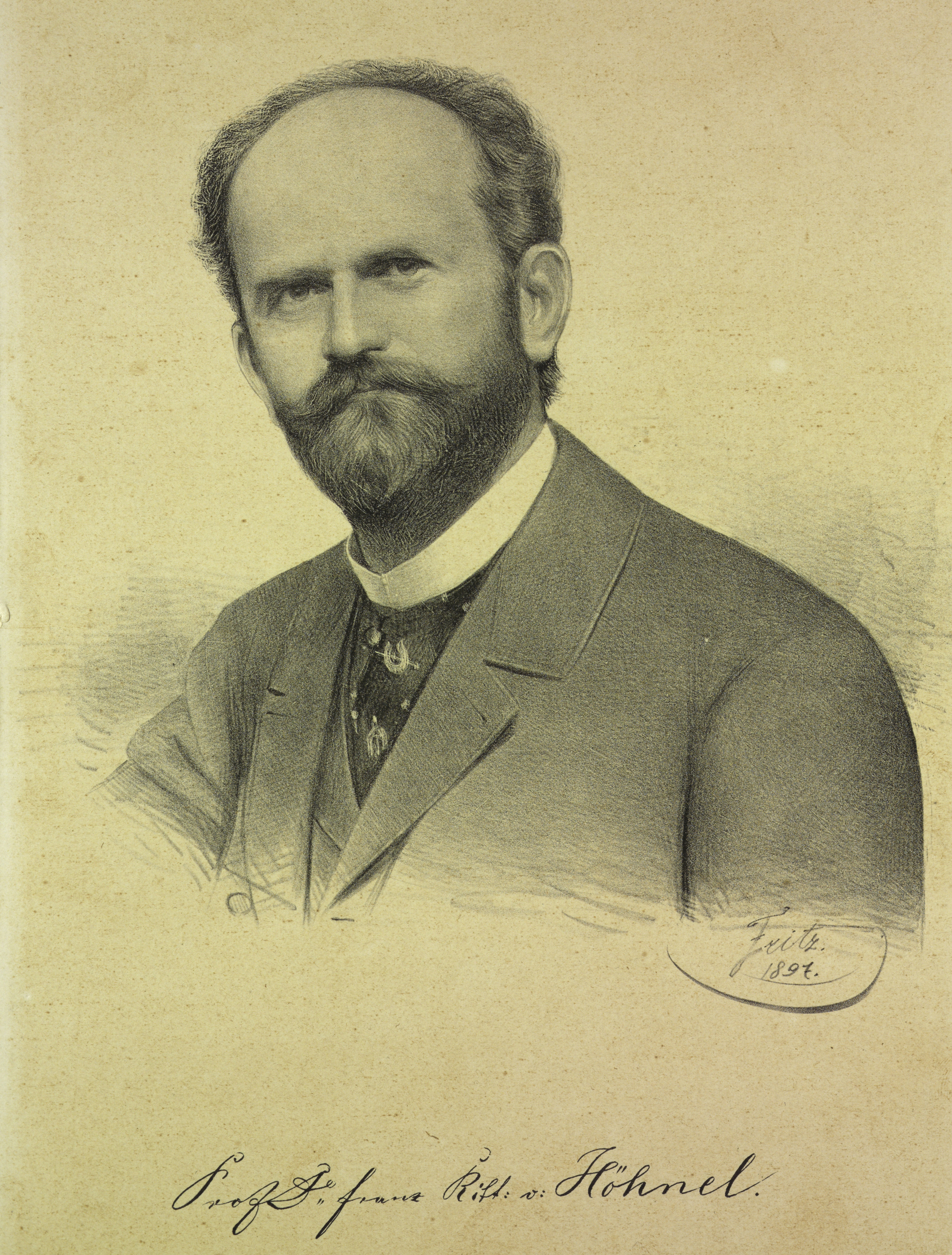
- Carte-de-visite c. 1897
- Born: 24 September 1852; Sombor
- Died: 11 November 1920 (aged 68); Vienna
- Education: Vienna University of Technology
- Known for: Taxonomy of the Coelomycetes
- Scientific career
- Fields: Mycology, Bryology, Algology
- Author abbrev. (botany): Höhn.

Franz Xaver Rudolf von Höhnel (24 September 1852 – 11 November 1920) was an Austrian bryologist, mycologist, and algologist, brother of explorer Ludwig von Höhnel (1857–1942). The fungus genus Hoehneliella is named after him.

== Life and work ==
Von Höhnel was born in Sombor, the sixth child of royal finance official Gottfried Höhnel who was transferred from Bratislava to Kashan, Vienna, Graz and then to Trieste. After the death of his father in 1868, the family moved to Vienna and he studied at the Technical University of Vienna and passed the teaching examination in 1874. He became an assistant professor of natural history at the University of Vienna. He obtained his PhD in Strasbourg in 1877 under A. de Bary and served as a research assistant to Friedrich J. Haberlandt. He worked on plant physiology and demonstrated the negative pressure in xylem vessels. He then taught forestry at the Mariabrunn Forest Academy near Vienna and in 1878 he became a private lecturer in botany at the Technical University in Vienna. In 1894 he became chair of plant anatomy and physiology. In 1887 he introduced microscopy as a subject in the university and wrote a book on the topic. He worked as a professor of botany in the Vienna University of Technology until his death in 1920. He shifted from plants to fungi only in 1892. Höhnel described roughly 250 new genera and 500 species of fungi, and was known for his contributions to the taxonomy of the Coelomycetes (asexual fungi that form conidia in a cavity (pycnidia) or a mat-like cushion of hyphae). He served as rector of Vienna University of Technology in 1905–06. He died in Vienna on November 11, 1920.

He made collecting trips to North Africa, South America, North America, Ceylon, Java and Asia Minor.

== Publications ==
The following is a list of his publications:

- Höhnel, F.X.R. von (1902). Fragmente zur Mykologie (I. Mitteilung). Sitzungsberichten der Kaiserliche Akademie der Wissenschaften in Wien Mathematische–Naturwissenschaftliche Klasse, Abt. 1 111: 987–1056.
- Höhnel, F.X.R. von (1903). Mycologische Fragmente. Annales Mycologici 1 (5): 391–414.
- Höhnel, F.X.R. von (1903). Mycologische Fragmente. XXVIII–XLI. Annales Mycologici 1 (6): 522–534.
- Höhnel, F.X.R. von (1904). Mycologische Fragmente. Annales Mycologici 2 (1): 38–60.
- Höhnel, F.X.R. von (1904). Mycologische Fragmente. IV. Annales Mycologici 2: 271–277.
- Höhnel, F.X.R. von (1904). Zur Kenntnis einiger Fadenpilze. Hedwigia 43: 295–299.
- Höhnel, F.X.R. von (1905). Mycologische Fragmente. LXXVI. Zur Synonymie einiger Pilze. Annales Mycologici 3: 187–190.
- Höhnel, F.X.R. von (1905). Mycologische Fragmente [77–97]. Annales Mycologici 3: 323–339.
- Höhnel, F.X.R. von (1905). Mycologische Fragmente XCVIII–CV. Annales Mycologici 3: 402–409, 4 figs.
- Höhnel, F.X.R. von (1905, publ. 1906). Mycologische Fragmente CVI–CXVII. Annales Mycologici 3 (6): 548–560, 6 figs.
- Höhnel, F.X.R. von (1906). Fragmente zur Mykologie (II. Mitteilung, Nr. 64 bis 91). Sitzungsberichten der Kaiserliche Akademie der Wissenschaften in Wien Mathematische–Naturwissenschaftliche Klasse, Abt. 1 115: 649–695.
- Höhnel, F.X.R. von (1906). Revision von 292 der von J. Feltgen aufgestellten Ascomycetenformen auf Grund der Originalexemplare. Sitzungsberichten der Kaiserliche Akademie der Wissenschaften in Wien Mathematische–Naturwissenschaftliche Klasse, Abt. 1 115: 1189–1327.
- Höhnel, F.X.R. von (1907). Eumycetes et Myxomycetes. In Schiffner, V. [ed.] Ergebnisse der Botanischen Expedition der Kaiserlichen Akademie der Wissenschaften nach Süd–Brasilien 1901. Denkschriften der Kaiserlichen Akademie der Wissenschaften Mathematische–Naturwissenschaftliche Klasse 83: 1–45.
- Höhnel, F.X.R. von (1907). Fragmente zur Mykologie (III. Mitteilung, Nr. 92 bis 155). Sitzungsberichten der Kaiserliche Akademie der Wissenschaften in Wien Mathematische–Naturwissenschaftliche Klasse, Abt. 1 116 (3): 83–162, 1 plate.
- Höhnel, F.X.R. von (1907). Fragmente zur Mykologie (IV. Mitteilung, Nr. 156 bis 168). Sitzungsberichten der Kaiserliche Akademie der Wissenschaften in Wien Mathematische–Naturwissenschaftliche Klasse, Abt. 1 116: 615–647.
- Höhnel, F.X.R. von (1909). Fragmente zur Mykologie (VI. Mitteilung, Nr. 182 bis 288). Sitzungsberichten der Kaiserliche Akademie der Wissenschaften in Wien Mathematische–Naturwissenschaftliche Klasse, Abt. 1 118: 275–452, 35 figs, 1 plate.
- Höhnel, F.X.R. von (1909). Fragmente zur Mykologie (VII. Mitteilung, Nr. 289 bis 353). Sitzungsberichten der Kaiserliche Akademie der Wissenschaften in Wien Mathematische–Naturwissenschaftliche Klasse, Abt. 1 118: 813–904.
- Höhnel, F.X.R. von (1909). Fragmente zur Mykologie (VIII. Mitteilung, Nr. 354 bis 406). Sitzungsberichten der Kaiserliche Akademie der Wissenschaften in Wien Mathematische–Naturwissenschaftliche Klasse, Abt. 1 118 (8): 1157–1246, 1 fig.
- Höhnel, F.X.R. von (1909). Fragmente zur Mykologie (VIII. Mitteilung, Nr. 407 bis 467). Sitzungsberichten der Kaiserliche Akademie der Wissenschaften in Wien Mathematische–Naturwissenschaftliche Klasse, Abt. 1 118: 1461–1552.
- Höhnel, F.X.R. von (1910). Fragmente zur Mykologie (X. Mitteilung, Nr. 468 bis 526). Sitzungsberichten der Kaiserliche Akademie der Wissenschaften in Wien Mathematische–Naturwissenschaftliche Klasse, Abt. 1 119: 393–473.
- Höhnel, F.X.R. von (1910). Fragmente zur Mykologie (XI. Mitteilung, Nr. 527 bis 573). Sitzungsberichten der Kaiserlische Akademie der Wissenschaften in Wien Mathematische–Naturwissenschaftliche Klasse, Abt. 1 119: 617–679.
- Höhnel, F.X.R. von (1910). Fragmente zur Mykologie (XII. Mitteilung, Nr. 574 bis 641). Sitzungsberichten der Kaiserlische Akademie der Wissenschaften in Wien Mathematische–Naturwissenschaftliche Klasse, Abt. 1 119: 877–958.
- Höhnel, F.X.R. von (1910). Fünfter Nachtrag zur Pilzflora des Sonntagberges (N.–Ö.). Beiträge zur Pilzflora Niederösterreichs. Verhandlungen der Zoologisch–Botanischen Gesellschaft in Wien 60: 303–335.
- Höhnel, F.X.R. von (1910). Fünfter Nachtrag zur Pilzflora des Sonntagberges (N.–Ö.). Beiträge zur Pilzflora Niederösterreichs [concl.]. Verhandlungen der Zoologisch–Botanischen Gesellschaft in Wien 60: 464–477.
- Höhnel, F.X.R. von (1911). Zur Systematik der Sphaeropsideen und Melanconieen. Annales Mycologici 9: 258–265.
- Höhnel, F.X.R. von (1911). Fragmente zur Mykologie (XIII. Mitteilung, Nr. 642 bis 718). Sitzungsberichten der Kaiserlische Akademie der Wissenschaften in Wien Mathematische–Naturwissenschaftliche Klasse, Abt. 1 120: 379–484.
- Höhnel, F.X.R. von (1912). Fragmente zur Mykologie (XIV. Mitteilung, Nr. 719 bis 792). Sitzungsberichten der Kaiserliche Akademie der Wissenschaften in Wien Mathematische–Naturwissenschaftliche Klasse, Abt. 1 121: 339–424, 2 plates.
- Höhnel, F.X.R. von (1913). Verzeichnis der von mir gemachten Angaben zur Systematik und Synonymie der Pilze. Österreichische Botanische Zeitschrift 63: 422–432.
- Höhnel, F.X.R. von (1913). Fragmente zur Mykologie (XV. Mitteilung, Nr. 793 bis 812). Sitzungsberichten der Kaiserlische Akademie der Wissenschaften in Wien Mathematische–Naturwissenschaftliche Klasse, Abt. 1 122: 255–309, 7 figs.
- Höhnel, F.X.R. von (1914). Fragmente zur Mykologie (XVI. Mitteilung, Nr. 813 bis 875). Sitzungsberichten der Kaiserliche Akademie der Wissenschaften in Wien Mathematische–Naturwissenschaftliche Klasse, Abt. 1 123: 49–155, 32 figs.
- Höhnel, F.X.R. von (1915). Fragmente zur Mykologie (XVII. Mitteilung, Nr. 876 bis 943). Sitzungsberichten der Kaiserliche Akademie der Wissenschaften in Wien Mathematische–Naturwissenschaftliche Klasse, Abt. 1 124: 49–159.
- Höhnel, F.X.R. von (1915). Beiträge zur Mykologie. IX. Über die Gattung Myxosporium Link. Zeitschr. Gärungsphys. 5: 191–215.
- Höhnel, F.X.R. von (1915, publ. 1916). Mykologisches. Österreichische Botanische Zeitschrift 65: 321–323.
- Höhnel, F.X.R. von (1916). Mykologisches [cont.]. Österreichische Botanische Zeitschrift 66: 51–60.
- Höhnel, F.X.R. von (1916). Mykologisches [concl.]. Österreichische Botanische Zeitschrift 66: 94–112.
- Höhnel, F.X.R. von (1916). Fragmente zur Mykologie. (XVIII. Mitteilung, Nr. 944 bis 1000). Sitzungsberichten der kaiserlich Akademie der Wissenschaften in Wien Mathematische–Naturwissenschaftliche Klasse, Abt. 1 125 (1–2): 1–112.
- Höhnel, F.X.R. von (1916). Fragmente zur Mykologie (XVIII. Mitteilung, Nr. 944 bis 1000). Sitzungsberichten der Kaiserliche Akademie der Wissenschaften in Wien Mathematische–Naturwissenschaftliche Klasse, Abt. 1 125 (1–2): 27–138.
- Höhnel, F.X.R. von (1917). Mycologische Fragmente. CXX–CXC. Annales Mycologici 15 (5): 293–383.
- Höhnel, F.X.R. von (1917). Mykologische Fragmente. Annales Mycologici 15: 318.
- Höhnel, F.X.R. von (1917). Erste vorläufige Mitteilung mykologischer Ergebnisse. (Nr. 1–106). Bericht der Deutschen Botanischen Gesellschaft 35: 246–256.
- Höhnel, F.X.R. von (1917). Zweite vorläufige Mitteilung mykologischer Ergebnisse [nr. 107–200]. Bericht der Deutschen Botanischen Gesellschaft 35: 351–360.
- Höhnel, F.X.R. von (1917). System der Phacidiales. Bericht der Deutschen Botanischen Gesellschaft 35: 416–422.
- Höhnel, F.X.R. von (1917). System der Diaportheen. Bericht der Deutschen Botanischen Gesellschaft 35: 631–638.
- Höhnel, F.X.R. von (1917). Fungi imperfecti. Beiträge zur Kenntnis derselben. Hedwigia 59: 236–284.
- Höhnel, F.X.R. von (1917). Fragmente zur Mykologie (XIX Mitteilung, Nr. 1001 bis 1030). Sitzungsberichten der Kaiserliche Akademie der Wissenschaften in Wien Mathematische–Naturwissenschaftliche Klasse, Abt. 1 126 (4–5): 283–352.
- Höhnel, F.X.R. von (1917). Fragmente zur Mykologie (XX. Mitt. Nr. 1031 bis 1057). Sitzungsberichten der Kaiserliche Akademie der Wissenschaften in Wien Mathematische–Naturwissenschaftliche Klasse, Abt. 1 126 (4–5): 353–399, 1 fig.
- Höhnel, F.X.R. von (1918). Mykologische Fragmente. CXCI–CCXC. Annales Mycologici 16 (1–2): 35–174.
- Höhnel, F.X.R. von (1918). Rehm: Ascomycetes exs. fasc. 56 und 57. Annales Mycologici 16: 209–224.
- Höhnel, F.X.R. von (1918). Dritte vorläufige Mitteilung mycologischer Ergebnisse (nr. 201–304). Bericht der Deutschen Botanischen Gesellschaft Sonderabdruck 36: 309–317.
- Höhnel, F.X.R. von (1918). Fungi Imperfecti. Beiträge zur Kenntnis derselben. Hedwigia 60 (3): 129–209.
- Höhnel, F.X.R. von (1918). Fragmente zur Mykologie (XXII. Mitteilung, Nr. 1092 bis 1153). Sitzungsberichten der Akademie der Wissenschaften in Wien Mathematische–Naturwissenschaftliche Klasse, Abt. 1 127 (8–9): 549–634.
- Höhnel, F.X.R. von (1918). Fragmente zur Mykologie. Sitzungsberichten der Kaiserliche Akademie der Wissenschaften in Wien Mathematische–Naturwissenschaftliche Klasse, Abt. 1 127 (4): 329–393.
- Höhnel, F.X.R. von (1919). Mykologische Fragmente. Nos. 291–314. Annales Mycologici 17: 114–133.
- Höhnel, F.X.R. von (1919). Über Discomyeeten vortauschcnde Microthyriaceen. Bericht der Deutschen Botanischen Gesellschaft 36: 465–470.
- Höhnel, F.X.R. von (1919). Fünfte vorläufige Mitteilungen mykologischer Ergebnisse. Berichte der Deutschen Botanischen Gesellschaft 37: 153–161.
- Höhnel, F.X.R. von (1919). Fragmente zur Mykologie. XXII Mitteilungen, nr. 1092 bis 1153. Sber. Akad. Wiss. Wien Mathematische–Naturwissenschaftliche Klasse, Abt. 1 128: 549–634.
- Höhnel, F.X.R. von (1919). Fragmente zur Mykologie (XXIII. Mitteilung, Nr. 1154 bis 1188). Sitzungsberichten der Akademie der Wissenschaften in Wien Mathematische–Naturwissenschaftliche Klasse, Abt. 1 128 (7–8): 535–625.
- Höhnel, F.X.R. von (1920). Mykologische Fragmente. Nos. 315–333. Annales Mycologici 18: 71–98.
- Höhnel, F.X.R. von (1920). Bemerkungen zu H. Klebahn, Haupt– und Nebenfrucht–formen der Ascomyceten 1918. Hedwigia 62: 38–55.
- Höhnel, F.X.R. von (1920). Beiträge zur Kenntnis derselben. Hedwigia 62: 56–89.
- Höhnel, F.X.R. von (1920). Fragmente zur Mykologie (XXIV. Mitteilung, Nr. 1189 bis 1214). Sitzungsberichten der Akademie der Wissenschaften in Wien Mathematische–Naturwissenschaftliche Klasse, Abt. 1 129 (3–4): 137–184.
- Höhnel, F.X.R. von (1923). Studien über Hyphomyzeten. Aus den hinterlassenen Schriften zusammengestellt und herausgegeben von Jos. Weese. Zentralblatt für Bakteriologie, Parasitenkunde, Infektionskrankheiten und Hygiene Abt. 2 60: 1–26.
- Höhnel, F.X.R. von (1923, publ. 1924). Beitrag zur Kenntnis der Gattung Cylindrosporium. Annales Mycologici 22 (1–2): 191–203.
- Höhnel, F.X.R. von (1925). Über die Gattung Ceuthospora Fr. Mitteilungen aus dem Bot. Lab. Techn. Hochsch. Wien 2 (4): 99–109.
- Höhnel, F.X.R. von (1926). Über die nebenfruchtformen von Therrya Sacc. und Colpoma Wallroth. Mitteilungen aus dem Botanischen Institut der Technischen Hochschule in Wien 3 (1).
- Höhnel, F.X.R. von (1926). Über Massaria corni Fuckel. In J. Weese [ed.], Mitteilungen aus dem Botanischen Institut der Technischen Hochschule in Wien 3 (3): 109–111.
- Höhnel, F.X.R. von (1927). Studien über Ascomyceten. 3. Mitteilung. Mitteilungen aus dem Botanischen Institut der Technischen Hochschule in Wien 4 (2): 33–80.
- Höhnel, F.X.R. von (1927). Über Fusoma veratri Allesch. Mitteilungen des Botanischen Instituts der Technischen Hochschule Wien 4 (3): 11–[112].
- Höhnel, F.X.R. von (1928). Über Sphaeria baggei Auerswald. In J. Weese [ed.], Mitteilungen aus dem Botanischen Institut der Technischen Hochschule in Wien 5: 113–114.
- Höhnel, F.X.R. von (1928). Über die Cytospora–Arten auf Salix in Europa. Mitteilungen des Botanischen Instituts der Technischen Hochschule Wien 5 (3): 54–58.
- Höhnel, F.X.R. von (1928). Über die Valsa und Cytospora–Arten auf Populus. Mitteilungen des Botanischen Instituts der Technischen Hochschule Wien 5 (3): 58–59.
- Höhnel, F.X.R. von (1928). Über Valseen und Cytospora auf Prunus in Europa. Mitteilungen des Botanischen Instituts der Technischen Hochschule Wien 5 (3): 60–64.
- Höhnel, F.X.R. von (1928). Valseen und Cytospora auf Pomaceen in Europa. Mitteilungen des Botanischen Instituts der Technischen Hochschule Wien 5 (3): 77–86.
- Höhnel, F.X.R. von (1929). Studien über Ascomyceten. 4. Mitteilung. Mitteilungen der Botanischen Laboratoriums der Technischen Hochschule, Wien 6: 97–120.
- Höhnel, F.X.R. von (1929). Beiträge zur Kenntnis der Gattung Fusicoccum. I. Mitteilung. Mitteilungen des Botanischen Instituts der Technischen Hochschule Wien 6 (1): 19–25.
- Höhnel, F.X.R. von (1930). Mykologische Beiträge. 2. Mitteilung. Mitteilungen aus dem Botanischen Institut der Technischen Hochschule in Wien 7: 83–96.
- Höhnel, F.X.R. von (1932). Mykologische Beiträge. 6. Mitteilungen. Mitteilungen aus dem Botanisches Institut der Technischen Hochschule in Wien 9: 1–21.
- Höhnel, F.X.R. von; Litschauer, V. (1906). Revision der Corticieen in Dr J. Schröter's ‘Pilze Schlesiens’ nach seinen Herbarexemplaren. Annales Mycologici 4 (3): 288–294.
- Höhnel, F.X.R. von; Litschauer, V. (1906). Beiträge zur Kenntnis der Corticeen. Sitzungsberichten der Kaiserlich Akademie der Wissenschaften in Wien Mathematische–naturwissenschaftliche Klasse 115 (1): 1549–1620 [reprint pages 1–72], 10 figs.
- Höhnel, F.X.R. von; Litschauer, V. (1907). Beiträge zur Kenntnis der Corticeen (II. Mitteilung). Sitzungsberichten der Kaiserlich Akademie der Wissenschaften in Wien Mathematische–naturwissenschaftliche Klasse 116 (1): 739–852 [reprint pages 1–114] 20 figs, 4 plates.
- Höhnel, F.X.R. von; Litschauer, V. (1908). Beiträge zur Kenntnis der Corticeen (III Mitteilung). Sitzungsberichten der Kaiserlich Akademie der Wissenschaften in Wien Mathematische–naturwissenschaftliche Klasse 117 (1): 1081–1124 [reprint pages 1–44], 10 figs.
- Höhnel, F.X.R. von; Weese, J. (1910). Zur Synonymie in der Gattung Nectria. Annales Mycologici 8: 464–468.

== See also ==
- Category:Taxa named by Franz Xaver Rudolf von Höhnel
