= Aigialus grandis =

Scientific classification
- Kingdom: Fungi
- Division: Ascomycota
- Class: Dothideomycetes
- Order: Pleosporales
- Family: Aigialaceae
- Genus: Aigialus
- Species: A. grandis

Binomial name
- Aigialus grandis Kohlmeyer & S. Schatz, 1986

Genus of fungi

Aigialus grandis is a fungus species of the genus of Aigialus. Aigialus grandis occurs in tropical and subtropical environments.
