= Fissuroma wallichiae =

Scientific classification
- Kingdom: Fungi
- Division: Ascomycota
- Class: Dothideomycetes
- Order: Pleosporales
- Family: Aigialaceae
- Genus: Fissuroma
- Species: F. wallichiae

Binomial name
- Fissuroma wallichiae Konta & K.D. Hyde., 2020

Synonyms
- Fissuroma wallichiana

Genus of fungi

Fissuroma wallichiae is a fungus species of the genus of Fissuroma which was discovered in southern Thailand.
