= Fissuroma maculans =

Scientific classification
- Kingdom: Fungi
- Division: Ascomycota
- Class: Dothideomycetes
- Order: Pleosporales
- Family: Aigialaceae
- Genus: Fissuroma
- Species: F. maculans

Binomial name
- Fissuroma maculans (Rehm) J.K. Liu, E.B.G. Jones & K.D. Hyde 2011

Synonyms
- Astrosphaeriella maculans Metasphaeria maculans

Genus of fungi

Fissuroma maculans is a fungus species of the genus of Fissuroma.
