= Zopfia rhizophila =

Scientific classification
- Kingdom: Fungi
- Division: Ascomycota
- Class: Dothideomycetes
- Order: Pleosporales
- Family: Zopfiaceae
- Genus: Zopfia
- Species: Z. rhizophila

Binomial name
- Zopfia rhizophila Rabenh., (1874)

Species of fungus

Zopfia rhizophila is a plant pathogen that causes Zopfia root rot in asparagus.
