= C21H34O5 =

The molecular formula C_{21}H_{34}O_{5} may refer to:

- Betaenone A, a secondary metabolite isolated from the fungus Pleospora betae
- Betaenone C, a secondary metabolite isolated from the fungus Pleospora betae
- Tetrahydrocortisol, a steroid and an inactive metabolite of cortisol
