= Aigialus parvus =

Scientific classification
- Kingdom: Fungi
- Division: Ascomycota
- Class: Dothideomycetes
- Order: Pleosporales
- Family: Aigialaceae
- Genus: Aigialus
- Species: A. parvus

Binomial name
- Aigialus parvus S. Schatz & Kohlm., 1986

Genus of fungi

Aigialus parvus is a fungus species of the genus of Aigialus. Aigialus parvus produces a number of bioactive compounds like Aigialomycin B, Aigialomycin D, Aigialospirol and Aigialone.
