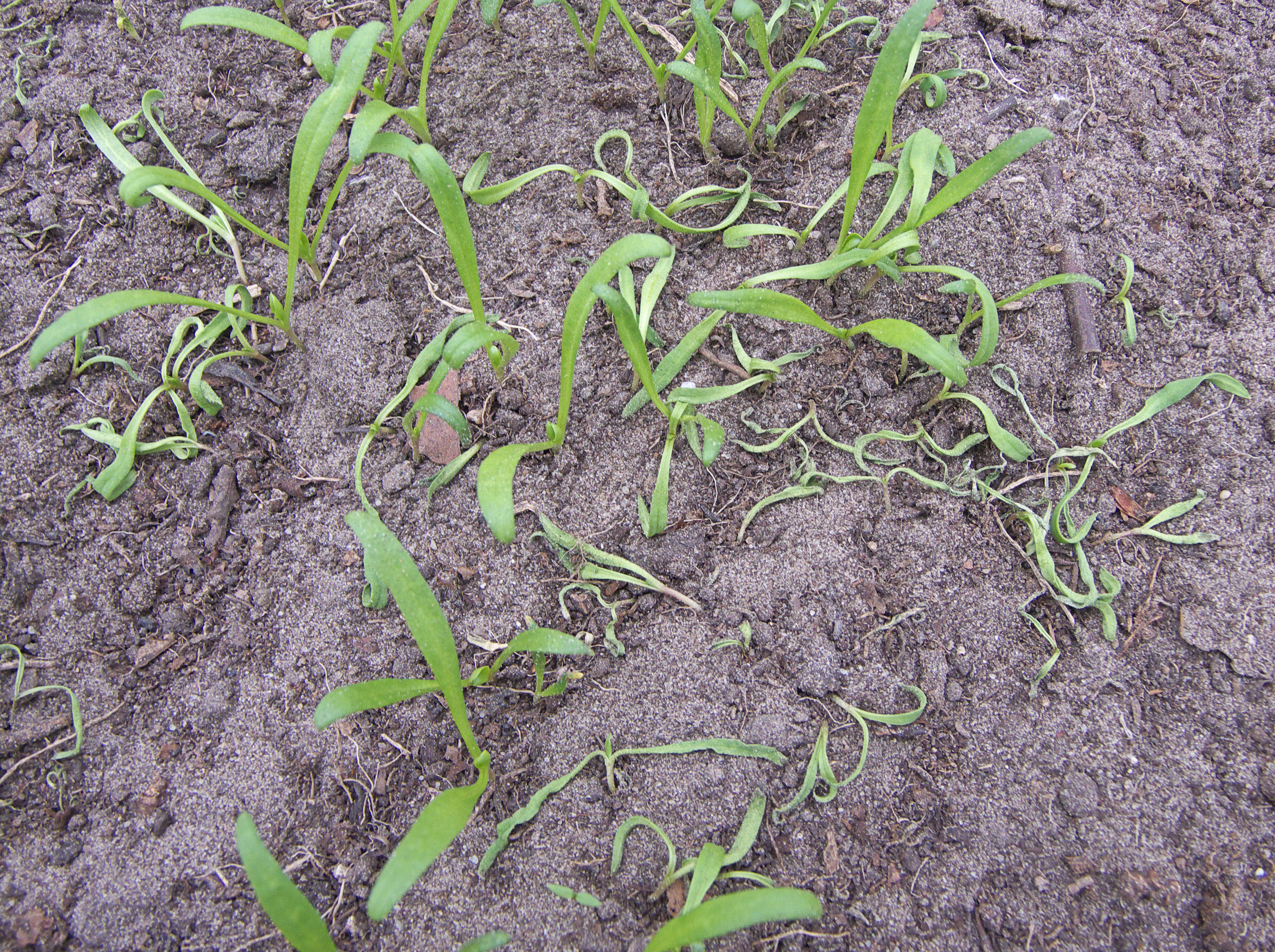
- Neocamarosporium betae (syn. Pleospora betae) on spinach

Scientific classification
- Kingdom: Fungi
- Division: Ascomycota
- Class: Dothideomycetes
- Order: Pleosporales
- Family: Neocamarosporiaceae; Wanas., Wijayaw., Crous & K.D. Hyde
- Genus: Neocamarosporium; Crous & M.J.Wingf.

Synonyms
- Parahendersonia A.W.Ramaley

= Neocamarosporium =

Genus of fungi

Neocamarosporium is a genus of ascomycete fungi, as accepted by Wijayawardene et al. 2020. The species are typically halotolerant (living in conditions of high salinity), being commonly found in saline environments like in saline water, hypersaline soils and especially in association with halophytes (plants near slat water).

This genus was originally described by Crous and M.J.Wingf. in 2014, and then placed in family Pleosporaceae. They were then placed in a new monotypic family of Neocamarosporiaceae by Wanas., Wijayaw., Crous & K.D. Hyde in 2017. The name of the genus refers to another earlier fungal genus Camarosporium (also within the Pleosporales order).

They have a cosmopolitan distribution worldwide. Including Iran.

As of 8 August 2023, the GBIF lists up to 21 species, while Species Fungorum lists about 22 species.

== Species ==
As accepted by Species Fungorum;

- Neocamarosporium aestuarinum M. Gonçalves & A. Alves (2019)
- Neocamarosporium aquaticum Prematunga, E.B.G. Jones & M.S. Calabon (2023)
- Neocamarosporium artemisiae Dayar. & E.B.G. Jones (2020)
- Neocamarosporium betae (Berl.) Ariyaw. & K.D. Hyde (2015)
- Neocamarosporium calvescens (Fr. ex Desm.) Ariyaw. & K.D. Hyde (2015)
- Neocamarosporium chenopodii (Ellis & Kellerm.) Wanas. & K.D. Hyde (2017)
- Neocamarosporium chersinae Crous (2017)
- Neocamarosporium chichastianum Papizadeh, Crous, Shahz. Faz. & Amoozegar (2014)
- Neocamarosporium endophyticum M. Gonçalves & A. Alves (2019)
- Neocamarosporium goegapense Crous & M.J. Wingf. (2014)
- Neocamarosporium halimiones M. Gonçalves & A. Alves (2019)
- Neocamarosporium jorjanense Papizadeh, Wijayaw., Amoozegar, Fazeli & K.D. Hyde (2017)
- Neocamarosporium korfii Wanas., E.B.G. Jones & K.D. Hyde (2017)
- Neocamarosporium lamiacearum Dayar., E.B.G. Jones & K.D. Hyde (2017)
- Neocamarosporium leipoldtiae Crous (2020)
- Neocamarosporium maritimae Dayar. & E.B.G. Jones (2020)
- Neocamarosporium obiones (Jaap) Wanas. & K.D. Hyde (2017)
- Neocamarosporium persepolis Papizadeh, Wijayaw., Amoozegar, Fazeli & K.D. Hyde (2017)
- Neocamarosporium phragmitis Wanas., E.B.G. Jones & K.D. Hyde (2018)
- Neocamarosporium salicorniicola Dayar., E.B.G. Jones & K.D. Hyde (2017)
- Neocamarosporium salsolae Wanas., Gafforov & K.D. Hyde (2017)
- Neocamarosporium solicola Papizadeh, Wijayaw., Amoozegar, Fazeli & K.D. Hyde (2017)
