= Zopfiofoveola =

Scientific classification
- Kingdom: Fungi
- Division: Ascomycota
- Class: Dothideomycetes
- Order: Pleosporales
- Family: Zopfiaceae
- Genus: Zopfiofoveola; D. Hawksw.

Type species
- Zopfiofoveola punctata (D. Hawksw. & C. Booth) D. Hawksw.

Genus of fungi

Zopfiofoveola is a genus of fungi in the family Zopfiaceae. This is a monotypic genus, containing the single species Zopfiofoveola punctata.
