= Celtidia =

Scientific classification
- Kingdom: Fungi
- Division: Ascomycota
- Class: Dothideomycetes
- Order: Pleosporales
- Family: Zopfiaceae
- Genus: Celtidia; J.M. Janse

Type species
- Celtidia duplicispora J.D. Janse

Genus of fungi

Celtidia is a genus of fungi in the family Zopfiaceae. This is a monotypic genus, containing the single species Celtidia duplicispora.
