= Fissuroma =

Scientific classification
- Domain: Eukaryota
- Kingdom: Fungi
- Division: Ascomycota
- Class: Dothideomycetes
- Order: Pleosporales
- Family: Aigialaceae
- Genus: Fissuroma; J.K.Liu, Phookamsak, E.B.G.Jones & K.D.Hyde (2011)

Species
- Fissuroma aggregata Fissuroma arengae Fissuroma bambusae Fissuroma calami Fissuroma caryotae Fissuroma maculans Fissuroma neoaggregatum Fissuroma palmae Fissuroma taiwanense Fissuroma thailandicum Fissuroma wallichiae

Genus of fungi

Fissuroma is a genus of fungi in the family Aigialaceae.
