= Cheiromoniliophora elegans =

Scientific classification
- Kingdom: Fungi
- Division: Ascomycota
- Class: Dothideomycetes
- Order: Pleosporales
- Family: Dictyosporiaceae
- Genus: Cheiromoniliophora
- Species: C. elegans

Binomial name
- Cheiromoniliophora elegans Tzean & J.L. Chen 1990

Synonyms
- Pseudodictyosporium elegans (Tzean & J.L. Chen) R. Kirschner 2013

Species of fungus

Cheiromoniliophora elegans is a species of fungus in the order Pleosporales in the class Dothideomycetes. It is the type species of its genus.
