= Richonia =

Scientific classification
- Kingdom: Fungi
- Division: Ascomycota
- Class: Dothideomycetes
- Order: Pleosporales
- Family: Zopfiaceae
- Genus: Richonia; Boud.

Type species
- Richonia variospora Boud.

Genus of fungi

Richonia is a Monotypic genus of fungi in the family Zopfiaceae. It only has the one known species of Richonia variospora Boud. (1885).

As two other species were later moved, Richonia boudieri (Arnaud) Arx & E. Müll. (1975) became a synonym of Rechingeriella boudieri and Richonia duplicispora (J.D. Janse) Arx & E. Müll. (1975) is now a synonym of Celtidia duplicispora.

The genus name of Richonia is in honour of Charles Édouard Richon (1820–1893), who was a French Doctor and botanist (Mycology) in the departement of Marne.

The genus was circumscribed by Jean Louis Emile Boudier in Rev. Mycol. (Toulouse) vol.7 on page 224 in 1885.
