= Ascocratera =

Scientific classification
- Kingdom: Fungi
- Division: Ascomycota
- Class: Dothideomycetes
- Order: Pleosporales
- Family: Aigialaceae
- Genus: Ascocratera; Kohlm.
- Species: A. manglicola

Binomial name
- Ascocratera manglicola Kohlm.

Genus of fungi

Ascocratera is a genus of fungi within the Aigialaceae family. This is a monotypic genus, containing the single species Ascocratera manglicola.
