= Passeriniella =

Scientific classification
- Kingdom: Fungi
- Division: Ascomycota
- Class: Dothideomycetes
- Subclass: incertae sedis
- Genus: Passeriniella; Berl.

Type species
- Passeriniella dichroa (Pass.) Berl.

Genus of fungi

Passeriniella is a genus of fungi in the class Dothideomycetes and in the Dothideales order. The relationship of this taxon to other taxa within the order is unknown (incertae sedis).

The genus name of Passeriniella is in honour of Giovanni Passerini (1816-1893), who was an Italian botanist and entomologist and also director of the Orto Botanico di Parma.

The genus was circumscribed by Augusto Napoleone Berlese in Icon. Fungorum vol.1 on page 51 in 1892.

== Species ==
As accepted by GBIF;

- Passeriniella adeana Petr.
- Passeriniella incarcerata (Sacc.) Berl.
- Passeriniella mangrovei G.L.Maria & K.R.Sridhar
- Passeriniella savoryellopsis K.D.Hyde & Mouzouras

== See also ==
- List of Dothideomycetes genera incertae sedis
