= C21H36O5 =

The molecular formula C_{21}H_{36}O_{5} (molar mass: 368.51 g/mol, exact mass: 368.2563 u) may refer to:

- Betaenone B
- Carboprost
- Constipatic acid
