= Rechingeriella =

Scientific classification
- Kingdom: Fungi
- Division: Ascomycota
- Class: Dothideomycetes
- Order: Pleosporales
- Family: Zopfiaceae
- Genus: Rechingeriella; Petr.

Type species
- Rechingeriella insignis Petr.

Genus of fungi

Rechingeriella is a genus of fungi in the family Zopfiaceae; according to the 2007 Outline of Ascomycota, the placement in this family is uncertain.

The genus name of Rechingeriella is in honour of Professor Karl Heinz Rechinger Hon FRSE (1906–1998), who was an Austrian botanist and phytogeographer.

The genus was circumscribed by Franz Petrak in Ann. Naturhist. Mus. Wien vol.50 on pages 410, 465 and 467 in 1939.

Species;

- Rechingeriella boudieri (Arnaud) D. Hawksw. (1979)
- Rechingeriella insignis Petr. (1940)
- Rechingeriella verrucosa (Urries) Petr. (1970)

Former species;

- R. bispora (N. Lundq.) Petr. (1968) now Copromyces bisporus in Sordariomycetidae family
- R. eutypoides Petr. (1954) now Monosporascus eutypoides in Diatrypaceae family
