= Coronopapilla =

Scientific classification
- Kingdom: Fungi
- Division: Ascomycota
- Class: Dothideomycetes
- Order: Pleosporales
- Family: Zopfiaceae
- Genus: Coronopapilla; Kohlm. & Volkm.-Kohlm.

Type species
- Coronopapilla avellina Kohlm. & Volkm.-Kohlm.

Species
- Coronopapilla avellina Coronopapilla mangrovei

Genus of fungi

Coronopapilla is a genus of fungi in the family Zopfiaceae; according to the 2007 Outline of Ascomycota, the placement in this family is uncertain.
