= Pontoporeia =

Pontoporeia may refer to:

- Pontoporeia (crustacean), a genus of amphipods in the family Pontoporeiidae
- Pontoporeia (fungus), a genus of fungi in the family Zopfiaceae
- Pontoporeia (mythology), a nereid in Greek mythology
