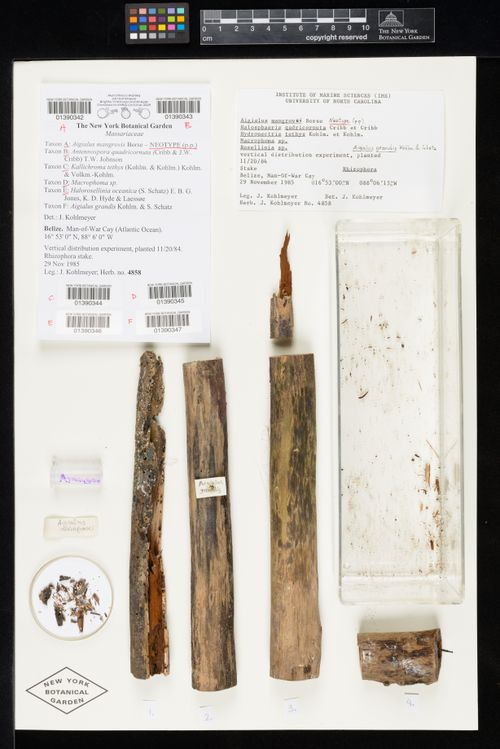
- Aigialus mangrovis

Scientific classification
- Domain: Eukaryota
- Kingdom: Fungi
- Division: Ascomycota
- Class: Dothideomycetes
- Order: Pleosporales
- Family: Aigialaceae
- Genus: Aigialus; S. Schatz & Kohlm.

Type species
- Aigialus grandis Kohlm. & S. Schatz

Species
- Aigialus grandis Aigialus mangrovis Aigialus parvus Aigialus rhizophorae

= Aigialus =

Genus of fungi

Aigialus is a genus of fungi in the family Aigialaceae.
