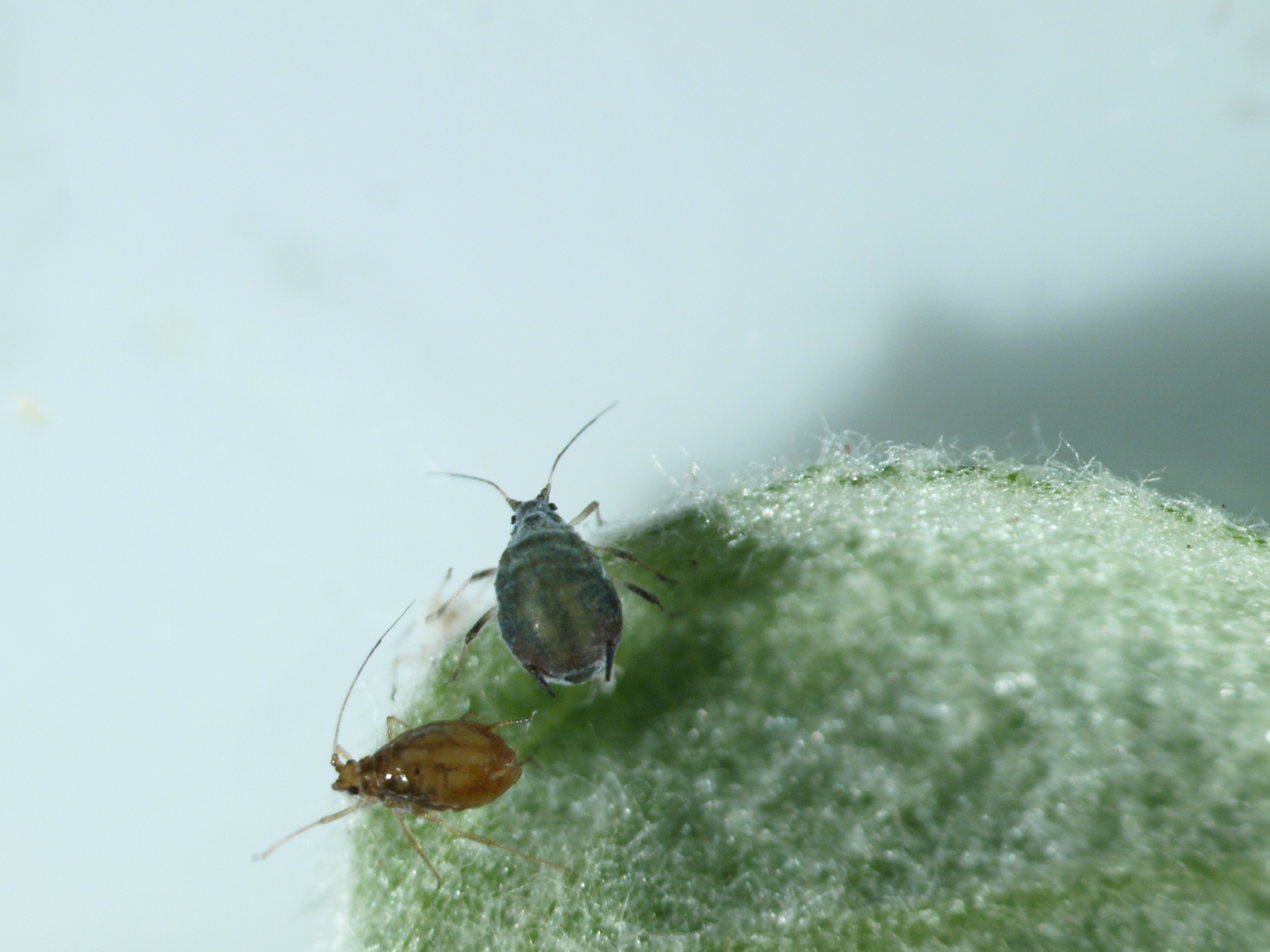

Scientific classification
- Kingdom: Animalia
- Phylum: Arthropoda
- Clade: Pancrustacea
- Class: Insecta
- Order: Hemiptera
- Suborder: Sternorrhyncha
- Family: Aphididae
- Genus: Dysaphis
- Species: D. plantaginea

Binomial name
- Dysaphis plantaginea Passerini, 1860

= Dysaphis plantaginea =

Species of aphid

Dysaphis plantaginea, also known as the rosy apple aphid, is a species of aphid which inhabits apple trees and is considered a pest in apple cultivation. It was described in 1860 by Giovanni Passerini, an Italian entomologist.

== Description ==
The length of D. plantaginea ranges between 2-3mm. Rosy apple aphids develop into imagines after 2-3 weeks, after going through five nymphal instars. Initially, young aphids are beige, but develop a rosy pink hue as they mature. Imagines are colored bluish-green to grey. Winged individuals display a reddish-grey abdomen marked by a long, dark patch on the dorsal side. The abdomen of the imagines is covered in a white wax coating and their cornicles are black. In this aphid species, wingless individuals have antennae shorter than their body, while the antennae of winged individuals are around as long as their body length. At first, the eggs are green, but gradually turn glossy black.

== Habitat and distribution ==
The aphid predominantly inhabits apple trees, and occasionally pear trees as its definitive host. It uses herbaceous plants, especially plantains, as its intermediate host. It is found across Europe, Asia, North Africa, and North America.

== Life cycle ==
D. plantaginea produces 5-6 generations per year parthenogenetically without being fertilized. Winged individuals are produced from early summer onwards so they can migrate to their intermediate host, a herbeceous plant. In fall, they return to their definitive host, usually an apple tree, where, after sexual reproduction by winged females and males, the eggs are laid in bark crevices and fruit stem scars, where they stay over the winter. In spring, the aphids hatch.

Ant attendance is common, typically by the Black garden ant, and has been proven to increase the size and growth of populations of D. plantaginea.

== As pests ==
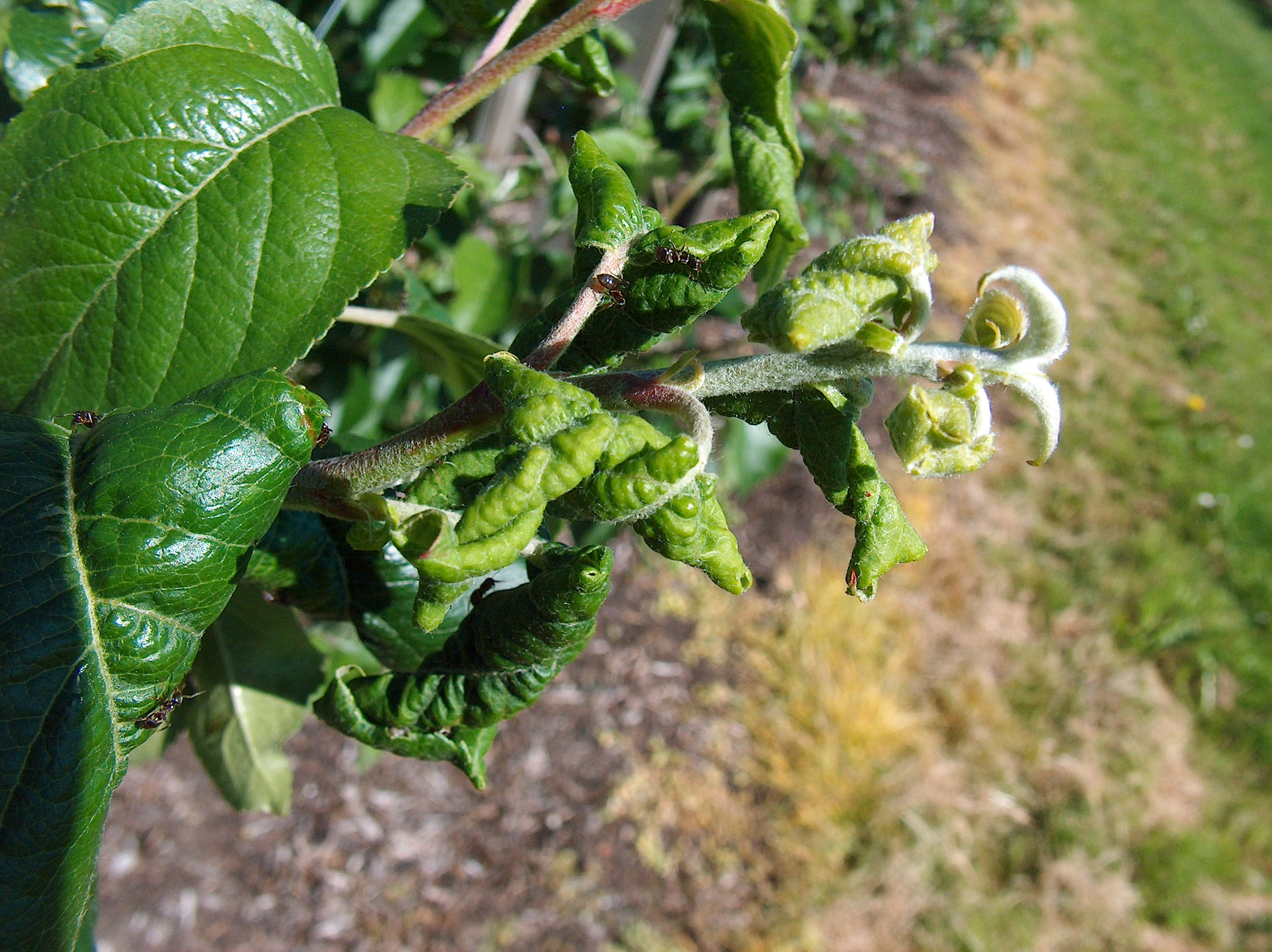
Symptoms on a tree infested by Dysaphis plantaginea

Out of all aphid species that inhabit apple trees, D. plantaginea is the most damaging.

The aphids cause enormous damage on fruits. They inject toxin contained in their saliva into buds and leaves while feeding on them, causing them to curl inward. Premature leaf drop can occur under heavy infestation. Fruits form abnormally and remain small, therefore, they cannot be sold. Moreover, the honeydew made by the aphids may cause sooty mold to grow on the plant.

In conventional fruit growing, control is achieved through insecticides. Organic farming relies on beneficial organisms such as ladybugs and hoverflies, as well as plant protection products based on azadirachtin and the removal of infested shoots.

== Gallery ==
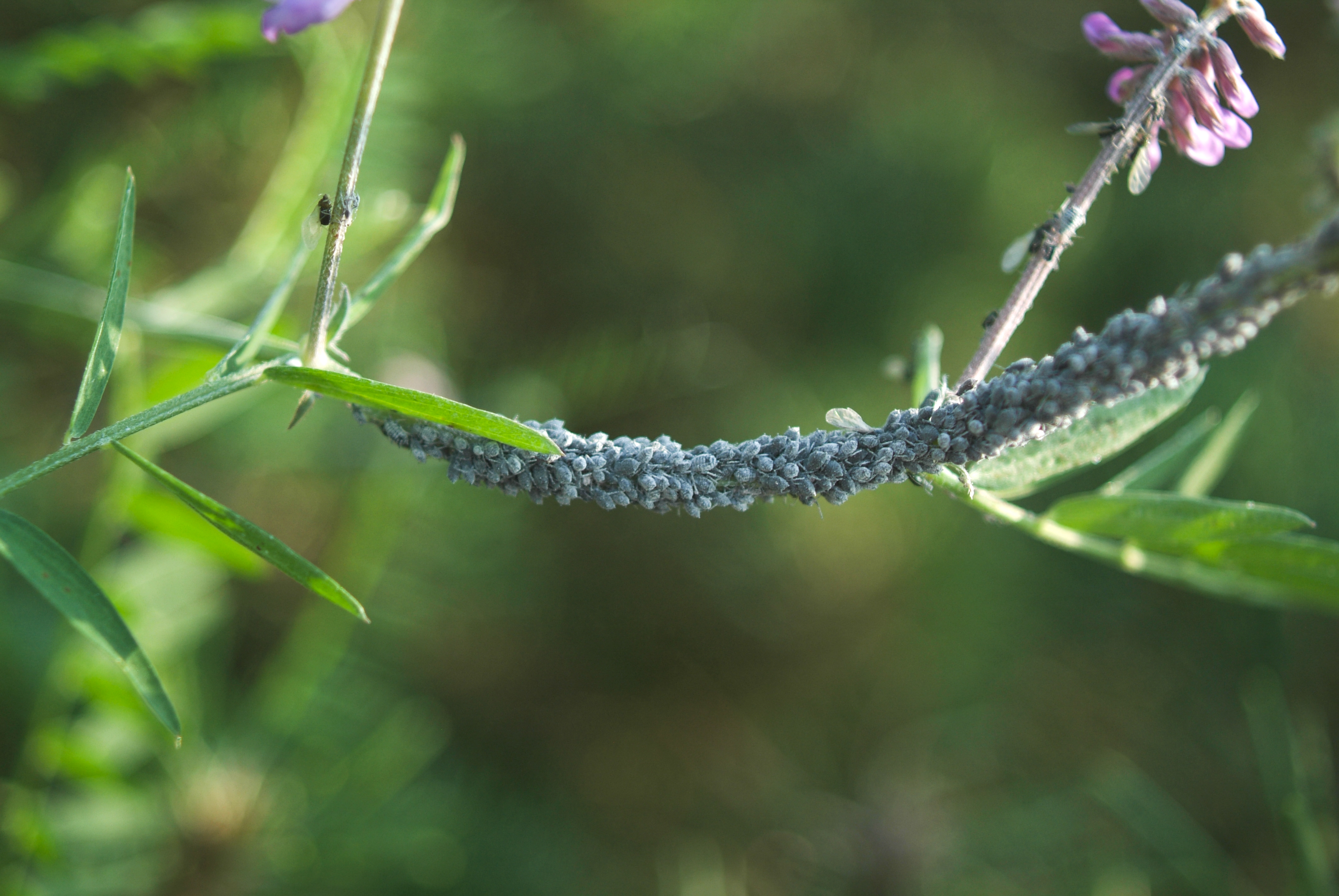
Colony of D. plantaginea

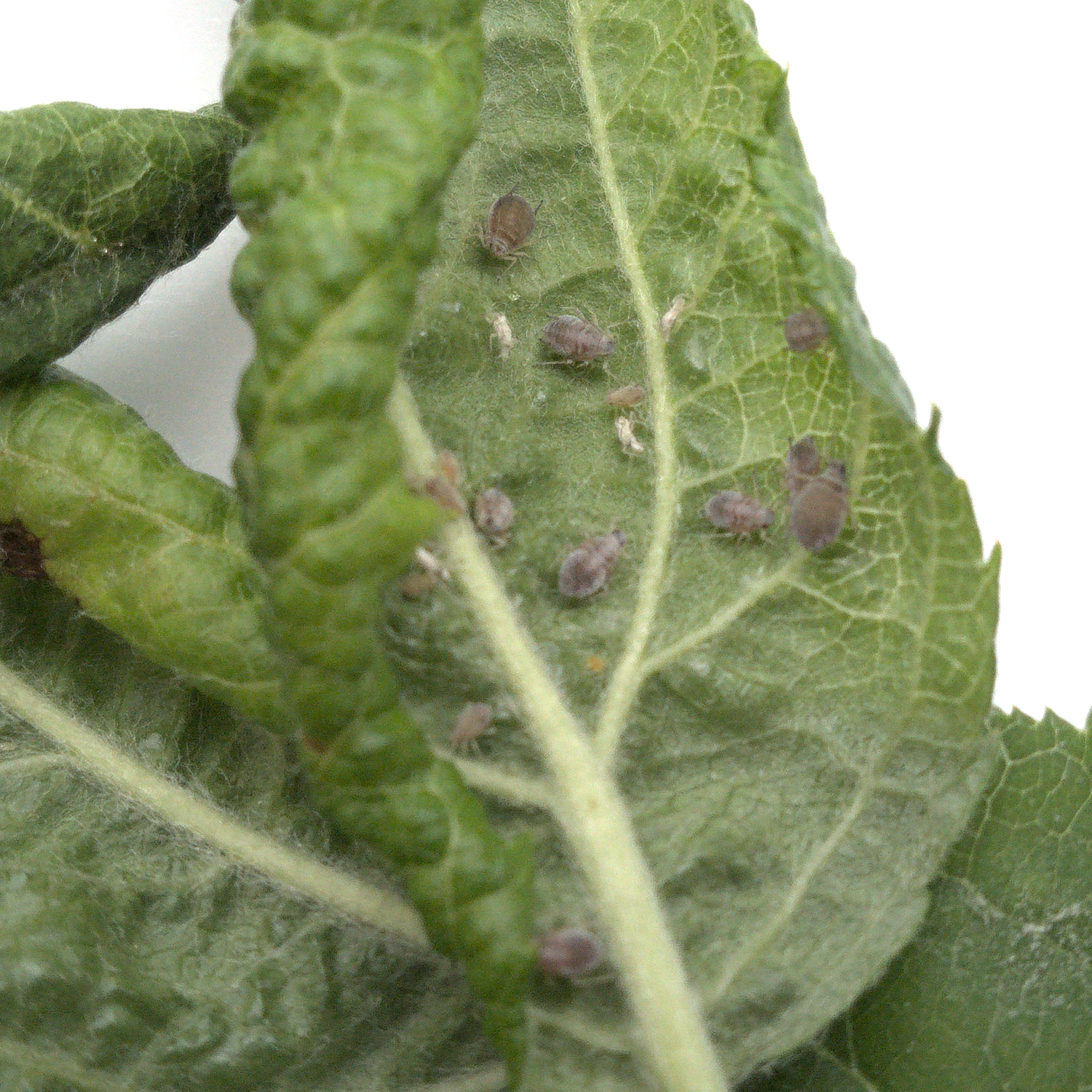
D. plantaginea on the underside of an apple leaf
