= Shiraia =

Shiraia is the scientific name of two genera of organisms and may refer to:

- Shiraia (fungus), a genus of fungi in the order Pleosporales
- Shiraia (moth), a genus of moths in the family Noctuidae
