= Betaenone =

Phytotoxin

Betaenones are phytotoxins found in the fungus Pleospora betae. The compounds were found to inhibit a variety of protein kinases.

Members of this class of chemical compounds include:

- Betaenone A
- Betaenone B
- Betaenone C

Two further betaenones were found in a species of the fungus Microsphaeropsis, which was isolated from the marine sponge Aplysina aerophoba.
