= Passerinula =

Scientific classification
- Kingdom: Fungi
- Division: Ascomycota
- Class: Dothideomycetes
- Subclass: incertae sedis
- Genus: Passerinula; Sacc.

Type species
- Passerinula candida Sacc.

Genus of fungi

Passerinula is a genus of fungi in the class Dothideomycetes. The relationship of this taxon to other taxa within the class is unknown (incertae sedis).

The genus name of Passerinula is in honour of Giovanni Passerini (1816-1893), who was an Italian botanist and entomologist and also director of the Orto Botanico di Parma.

The genus was circumscribed by Pier Andrea Saccardo in Grevillea vol.4 on page 21 in 1875.

== Species ==
As accepted by GBIF;

- Passerinula candida Sacc.
- Passerinula dubitationum (Speg.) E.Müll.
- Passerinula rubescens Rehm

They also place the genus within Pleosporales Order.

== See also ==
- List of Dothideomycetes genera incertae sedis
