= Zopfia =

Scientific classification
- Domain: Eukaryota
- Kingdom: Fungi
- Division: Ascomycota
- Class: Dothideomycetes
- Order: Pleosporales
- Family: Zopfiaceae
- Genus: Zopfia; Rabenh. (1874)

Type species
- Zopfia rhizophila Rabenh. (1887)

Synonyms
- Pontoporeia Kohlm. (1963)

Genus of fungi

Zopfia is a genus of fungi in the family Zopfiaceae. The widespread genus contained 5 species, until another species was accepted.

The genus was circumscribed by Gottlob Ludwig Rabenhorst in Fungi europ. exsicc. no. 1734. in 1874.

The genus name of Zopfia is in honour of Friedrich (or Friederich) Wilhelm Zopf (1846–1909), who was a well-known German botanist and mycologist. He dedicated to his whole life with fungal biology, particularly in classification of fungi and dye production in fungi and lichens.

== Species ==
As accepted by Species Fungorum;

- Zopfia albiziae M.L. Farr (1964)
- Zopfia caricis-firmae Nograsek (1990)
- Zopfia pakistanica Matsush. (1995)
- Zopfia rhizophila Rabenh. (1874)
- Zopfia rosatii Segretain & Destombes ex D. Hawksw. & C. Booth (1974)
- Zopfia saitoi Minoura & T. Muroi (1978)

Former species;

- Z. bilgramii D. Hawksw., C. Booth & Morgan-Jones (1974) = Ulospora bilgramii, Testudinaceae
- Z. biturbinata (Durieu & Mont.) Malloch & Cain (1972) = Pontoporeia biturbinata, Zopfiaceae
- Z. boudieri Arnaud (1913) = Rechingeriella boudieri, Zopfiaceae
- Z. cunninghamiae D. Hawksw. & C. Booth (1974) = Neotestudina cunninghamiae, Testudinaceae
- Z. duplicispora (J.D. Janse) Malloch & Cain (1972) = Celtidia duplicispora, Zopfiaceae
- Z. insignis (Petr.) D. Hawksw. & C. Booth (1974) = Rechingeriella insignis, Zopfiaceae
- Z. nicotiae (Parg.-Leduc) D. Hawksw. & C. Booth (1974) = Lepidosphaeria nicotiae, Testudinaceae
- Z. punctata D. Hawksw. & C. Booth (1974) = Zopfiofoveola punctata, Zopfiaceae
- Z. terrestris (Bizz.) D. Hawksw. & C. Booth (1974) = Testudina terrestris, Testudinaceae
- Z. variospora (Boud.) Arnaud (1913) = Richonia variospora, Zopfiaceae
