= List of Camarosporium species =

This is a list of the fungus species in the genus Camarosporium. Many are plant pathogens. As of 2023 August 10, the GBIF lists up to 300 species, while Species Fungorum lists about 261 species. This list is based on the Species Fungorum list.

== A ==
- Camarosporium acaciigenum S. Ahmad (1967)
- Camarosporium acanthophylli Kalymb. (1960)
- Camarosporium achilleae Hollós (1906)
- Camarosporium adenocarpi Unamuno (1930)
- Camarosporium aequivocum (Pass.) Sacc. (1884)
- Camarosporium agavifoliorum A.W. Ramaley & M.E. Barr (1995)
- Camarosporium allii Verpl. & R. Broecke (1936)
- Camarosporium ambiens (Cooke) Grove (1937)
- Camarosporium ammodendri Kalymb. (1960)
- Camarosporium anacardii Bat. & Peres (1965)
- Camarosporium andicola (Speg.) Sacc. & Trotter (1913)
- Camarosporium andinum Speg. (1902)
- Camarosporium arbuti Bondartseva (1960)
- Camarosporium ariae Oudem. (1894)
- Camarosporium armeriae Unamuno (1931)
- Camarosporium artemisiae Hollós (1909)
- Camarosporium artemisiicola Golovin (1950)
- Camarosporium arthrocnemonis Unamuno (1930)
- Camarosporium arthrophyti Byzova (1970)
- Camarosporium asplenii Siemaszko (1923)
- Camarosporium astericola Ellis & Barthol. (1902)
- Camarosporium asterinum Petr. (1924)
- Camarosporium astragali Höhn. (1905)
- Camarosporium astragalinum Sacc. & Trotter (1913)
- Camarosporium atraphaxis Kravtzev (1961)
- Camarosporium atriplicis J.V. Almeida & Sousa da Câmara (1905)
- Camarosporium aucupariae Kirschst. (1936)
- Camarosporium aureum Norph., Bulgakov & K.D. Hyde (2015)

== B ==
- Camarosporium balchaschense Kravtzev (1961)
- Camarosporium balsaiobrei Unamuno (1940)
- Camarosporium berberidis Cooke (1885)
- Camarosporium betulae Dearn. & Barthol. (1928)
- Camarosporium betulinum Died. (1914)
- Camarosporium bignoniae Gonz. Frag. (1923)
- Camarosporium boerhaviae S. Ahmad (1967)
- Camarosporium brasilianum (Speg.) Van Warmelo & B. Sutton (1981)
- Camarosporium buddlejae Tassi (1901)
- Camarosporium bulgaricum Petr. (1931)
- Camarosporium bygdoense Henn. (1904)

== C ==
- Camarosporium caesalpiniae Gucevič (1960)
- Camarosporium calligoni Kravtzev (1955)
- Camarosporium calophacae Henn. (1902)
- Camarosporium canariense Petr. (1929)
- Camarosporium caprifolii Brunaud (1887)
- Camarosporium carlinae Jørst. (1966)
- Camarosporium carpini Baudyš & Picb. (1924)
- Camarosporium castaneae Woron. (1916)
- Camarosporium ceanothi Dearn. (1936)
- Camarosporium celtidicola Gucevič (1959)
- Camarosporium celtidiphilum Gucevič (1962)
- Camarosporium cephalanthi Henn. (1914)
- Camarosporium cephalophorae Golovin (1950)
- Camarosporium chengii Gucevič (1960)
- Camarosporium chrozophorae Gapon. (1971)
- Camarosporium cisti Politis (1949)
- Camarosporium cistinum Cooke (1885)
- Camarosporium cladrastidis Henn. (1906)
- Camarosporium clathrosporum Petr. (1940)
- Camarosporium coggygriae Zerova (1951)
- Camarosporium coluteicola N.F. Buchw. (1958)
- Camarosporium comari Henn. (1903)
- Camarosporium corni-maris Hüseyın (1968)
- Camarosporium coronillae (Sacc. & Speg.) Sacc. (1878)
- Camarosporium cotini Sandu (1962)
- Camarosporium crataegi Oudem. (1902)
- Camarosporium cruciseptatum Matsush. (1996)

== D ==
- Camarosporium dalmaticum (Thüm.) Zachos & Tzav.-Klon. (1979)
- Camarosporium dendrostellerae Kravtzev (1961)
- Camarosporium dianthicola Petr. (1940)
- Camarosporium diospyri Syd. & P. Syd. (1900)
- Camarosporium dulcamarae Died. (1906)

== E ==
- Camarosporium elaeagnellum Fairm. (1910)
- Camarosporium elaeagni Potebnia (1907)
- Camarosporium ephedrae Cooke & Massee (1887)
- Camarosporium eremosparti Szembel (1924)
- Camarosporium erianthi Bubák & Serebrian. (1916)
- Camarosporium eriocryptum Fairm. (1923)
- Camarosporium eryngii T.M. Achundov (1971)
- Camarosporium estreltii Fairm. (1918)
- Camarosporium eurotiae Wehm. (1964)

== F ==
- Camarosporium farsetianum S. Ahmad (1967)
- Camarosporium feurichii Henn. (1904)
- Camarosporium ficinum S. Ahmad (1967)
- Camarosporium ficus Grove (1937)
- Camarosporium forsythiae Hollós (1906)
- Camarosporium frangulae Petr. (1924)
- Camarosporium fruticosae S. Ahmad (1967)

== G ==
- Camarosporium gilliesii Gucevič (1960)
- Camarosporium globosum Wehm. (1964)
- Camarosporium glycyrrhizae Sandu & Mítítíuc (1971)
- Camarosporium gnidii Nann. (1928)
- Camarosporium gompholobii Petr. (1954)
- Camarosporium graminicola Ellis & Everh. (1893)
- Camarosporium grovei Dejeva (1970)
- Camarosporium gucevicziae Trebelsk. (1973)
- Camarosporium guyonianum (Mont. & Durieu) Van Warmelo & B. Sutton (1981)

== H ==
- Camarosporium halimi Maubl. (1903)
- Camarosporium haloxylicola Kravtzev (1955)
- Camarosporium haplophylli Byzova (1970)
- Camarosporium hederae Ellis & Everh. (1900)
- Camarosporium henningsianum Kabát & Bubák (1912)
- Camarosporium hippophaes Gucevič (1960)
- Camarosporium hollosii Sacc. & Trotter (1913)
- Camarosporium hymenocrateris Kalymb. (1960)
- Camarosporium hypericorum M. Petrov (1927)

== I ==
- Camarosporium ilicis Oudem. (1898)
- Camarosporium inflatescens Curzi & Barbaini (1927)
- Camarosporium insuetum Petr. (1950)

== J ==
- Camarosporium jacarandae Gonz. Frag. (1921)
- Camarosporium javanicae S. Ahmad (1967)
- Camarosporium jonkershoekense Marinc., M.J. Wingf. & Crous (2008)
- Camarosporium juniperinum Georgescu & Badea (1935)

== K ==
- Camarosporium kalidii Woron. (1913)
- Camarosporium karagandaense Vasyag. (1970)
- Camarosporium karstenii Sacc. & P. Syd. (1899)
- Camarosporium kerriae Hollós (1910)
- Camarosporium kirchneri Staritz (1914)
- Camarosporium koelreuteriae Died. (1904)
- Camarosporium kogelbergense Crous, M.J. Wingf. & Marinc. (2008)
- Camarosporium kotschyi Petr. (1940)
- Camarosporium kriegeri Bres. (1896)
- Camarosporium kurdicum Petr. (1959)
- Camarosporium kursanovii Mekht. (1962)

== L ==
- Camarosporium laburni Sacc. & Roum. (1882)
- Camarosporium lagenariae Gapon. (1971)
- Camarosporium lagochili Byzova (1970)
- Camarosporium lantanae (Fleischh.) Sacc. (1884)
- Camarosporium lauri Grove (1937)
- Camarosporium lavandulae Dias (1954)
- Camarosporium leguminum Jaap (1916)
- Camarosporium lespedezae Ziling (1936)
- Camarosporium limoniae Cooke (1885)
- Camarosporium linariae Golovin (1950)
- Camarosporium lonicerae S. Ahmad (1971)
- Camarosporium lusitanicum M.T. Lucas & Sousa da Câmara (1954)
- Camarosporium lyciicola (Speg.) Sacc. & Trotter (1913)
- Camarosporium lyndonvillae Sacc. (1906)

== M ==
- Camarosporium maclurae Peck (1912)
- Camarosporium macrosporum (Berk. & Broome) Sacc. (1884)
- Camarosporium macrostachyum Unamuno (1930)
- Camarosporium magellanicum Speg. (1924)
- Camarosporium malcolmiae Gapon. (1971)
- Camarosporium meliae Annal. (1960)
- Camarosporium metasequoiae Gucevič (1960)
- Camarosporium microsporiferum Matsush. (1996)
- Camarosporium mirabile Petr. (1948)
- Camarosporium molluginis Petr. (1925)
- Camarosporium moravicum Petr. (1921)
- Camarosporium mori Sacc. (1884)
- Camarosporium myopori Hansf. (1954)

== N ==
- Camarosporium nigricans McAlpine (1902)
- Camarosporium nitrariae Murashk. (1929)
- Camarosporium noaeae Bubák (1914)
- Camarosporium nolinae A.W. Ramaley & M.E. Barr (1995)
- Camarosporium nyssae Allesch. (1901)

== O ==
- Camarosporium obtusum Nann. (1927)
- Camarosporium oleae Politis (1935)
- Camarosporium oleariae McAlpine (1903)
- Camarosporium onobrychidis Bubák (1914)
- Camarosporium orchidicola E.K. Cash & A.M.J. Watson (1955)
- Camarosporium oreades (Durieu & Mont.) Sacc. (1884)
- Camarosporium origani Milovtz. (1937)
- Camarosporium orni Henn. (1903)

== P ==
- Camarosporium palezkii Serebrian. (1912)
- Camarosporium palliatum Kohlm. & E. Kohlm. (1979)
- Camarosporium parasiticum H.C. Greene (1956)
- Camarosporium parrotiae Allesch. (1901)
- Camarosporium passerinii Sacc. (1892)
- Camarosporium pegani Bubák (1914)
- Camarosporium pentatropidis S. Ahmad (1964)
- Camarosporium persicae Maubl. (1907)
- Camarosporium phlomidicola Bubák (1906)
- Camarosporium phlomidis Petr. (1943)
- Camarosporium phyllostachydis I. Miyake & Hara (1910)
- Camarosporium platani Politis (1949)
- Camarosporium plectranthi S. Ahmad (1971)
- Camarosporium podocarpi Gucevič (1960)
- Camarosporium poincianae Gucevič (1960)
- Camarosporium polygoni-sieboldii Henn. (1914)
- Camarosporium pommersheimii Moesz (1931)
- Camarosporium ponticum Petr. (1931)
- Camarosporium populinum Maubl. (1905)
- Camarosporium potebniae Sacc. & Trotter (1913)
- Camarosporium pruni-domesticae Frolov (1968)
- Camarosporium prunifolium McAlpine (1902)
- Camarosporium psammae Nann. (1928)
- Camarosporium pteleae Hollós (1906)
- Camarosporium pteridis H.C. Greene (1964)
- Camarosporium pterocaryae Gucevič (1960)
- Camarosporium pulchellum Speg. (1910)
- Camarosporium pulchrum Woron. (1913)
- Camarosporium pusillum Cooke (1890)
- Camarosporium pygmaeum (Sacc.) Van Warmelo & B. Sutton (1981)
- Camarosporium pyrenaicum Urries (1944)
- Camarosporium pyricola Gonz. Frag. (1924)

== Q ==
- Camarosporium quaternatum (Hazsl.) Schulzer (1870)
- Camarosporium quercus Sacc. & Roum. (1884)

== R ==
- Camarosporium raphiolepidis Died. (1914)
- Camarosporium reaumuriae Kalymb. (1960)
- Camarosporium rhagodiae Tassi (1900)
- Camarosporium rhodotypi Hollós (1907)
- Camarosporium ribis Briard (1888)
- Camarosporium rosae Grove (1937)
- Camarosporium roumeguerei Sacc. (1880)
- Camarosporium rubicola (Sacc.) Sacc. (1884)

== S ==
- Camarosporium salicorniae Hansf. (1954)
- Camarosporium salsolae Urries (1933)
- Camarosporium salsolicola Woron. (1915)
- Camarosporium samuelii Hansf. (1954)
- Camarosporium santiaguinum (Speg.) Sacc. (1913)
- Camarosporium sarcinosporum Bubák (1914)
- Camarosporium sarmenticum (Sacc.) Sacc. (1884)
- Camarosporium sarothamni Unamuno (1930)
- Camarosporium scoparii Petr. (1924)
- Camarosporium scoparium Unamuno (1930)
- Camarosporium setuliferum (Speg.) Petr. & Syd. (1936)
- Camarosporium shahvaricum Petr. (1949)
- Camarosporium silenes-ponticae Manoliu & Mítítíuc (1976)
- Camarosporium siliquastri Henn. (1914)
- Camarosporium siphonis Petr. (1924)
- Camarosporium smilacicola Petr. (1947)
- Camarosporium sogdianae Kravtzev & Deeva (1970)
- Camarosporium solandri Cooke (1892)
- Camarosporium solani S. Ahmad & Archad (1972)
- Camarosporium sophorae Gonz. Frag. ex Trotter (1931)
- Camarosporium spiraeae Cooke (1885)
- Camarosporium staphyleae Cooke (1885)
- Camarosporium statices Szembel (1924)
- Camarosporium staurophragmium Tassi (1900)
- Camarosporium steineri Petr. (1963)
- Camarosporium stipae Died. (1910)
- Camarosporium strobilinum E. Bommer, M. Rousseau & Sacc. (1892)
- Camarosporium suaedae S. Ahmad (1967)
- Camarosporium suaedae-fruticosae S. Ahmad (1967)
- Camarosporium sympegmatis Schwarzman (1970)
- Camarosporium syringae Cooke & Massee (1887)

== T ==
- Camarosporium tamaricis Hollós (1906)
- Camarosporium tamaricum Mekht. (1962)
- Camarosporium tanaceti Oudem. (1901)
- Camarosporium tarhunense Sacc. (1913)
- Camarosporium tauriae Gucevič (1960)
- Camarosporium thujae Hollós (1907)
- Camarosporium tilakii R. Rao (1965)
- Camarosporium tiliae Sacc. & Penz. (1882)
- Camarosporium transversum Gutner (1927)
- Camarosporium trevoae (Speg.) Sacc. & Trotter (1913)
- Camarosporium tricyclae Speg. (1910)
- Camarosporium tricyclinum Speg. (1910)
- Camarosporium truncigenum Petr. (1942)
- Camarosporium tulipiferae Died. (1904)

== U ==
- Camarosporium umbonatum Brenckle (1929)

== V ==
- Camarosporium vernoniae S. Ahmad (1971)
- Camarosporium viniferum S. Ahmad (1967)
- Camarosporium virgiliae Henn. (1903)
- Camarosporium viticis Petr. (1953)

== W ==
- Camarosporium wisteriae Grove (1919)
- Camarosporium wisterianum Fairm. (1918)

== X ==
- Camarosporium xanthoceratis Gucevič (1960)

== Y ==
- Camarosporium yuccaesedum Fairm. (1918)

== Z ==
- Camarosporium zelkovae Syd. & P. Syd. (1900)
- Camarosporium ziziphorae Schwarzman (1970)
