= Caryospora =

Caryospora may refer to

- Caryospora (aveolate), a genus of protozoa
- Caryospora (fungus), a genus of fungi
