= Halotthia =

Scientific classification
- Kingdom: Fungi
- Division: Ascomycota
- Class: Dothideomycetes
- Order: Pleosporales
- Family: Zopfiaceae
- Genus: Halotthia; Kohlm.

Type species
- Halotthia posidoniae (Durieu & Mont.) Kohlm.

Genus of fungi

Halotthia is a genus of fungi in the family Zopfiaceae; according to the 2007 Outline of Ascomycota, the placement in this family is uncertain. This is a monotypic genus, containing the single species Halotthia posidoniae.
