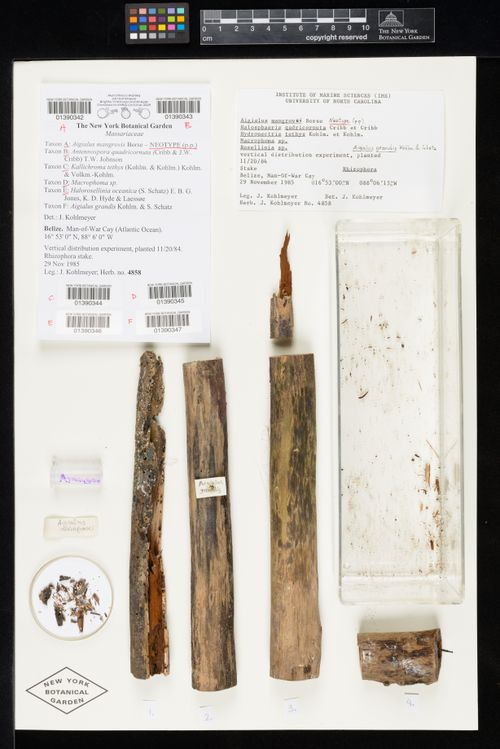

Scientific classification
- Kingdom: Fungi
- Division: Ascomycota
- Class: Dothideomycetes
- Order: Pleosporales
- Family: Aigialaceae
- Genus: Aigialus
- Species: A. mangrovis

Binomial name
- Aigialus mangrovis Borse, 1987

= Aigialus mangrovis =

Genus of fungi

Aigialus mangrovis is a fungus species of the genus of Aigialus. Aigialus mangrovis has been first isolated from the mangrove Rhizophora mucronata in Maharashtra in India.
