= Neophaeosphaeria =

Scientific classification
- Kingdom: Fungi
- Division: Ascomycota
- Class: Dothideomycetes
- Order: Pleosporales
- Family: Phaeosphaeriaceae
- Genus: Neophaeosphaeria; Câmara, M.E. Palm & A.W. Ramaley

Type species
- Neophaeosphaeria filamentosa (Ellis & Everh.) M.P.S. Câmara, M.E. Palm & A.W. Ramaley

Genus of fungi

Neophaeosphaeria is a genus of fungi in the family Phaeosphaeriaceae.
