= Aigialomycin D =

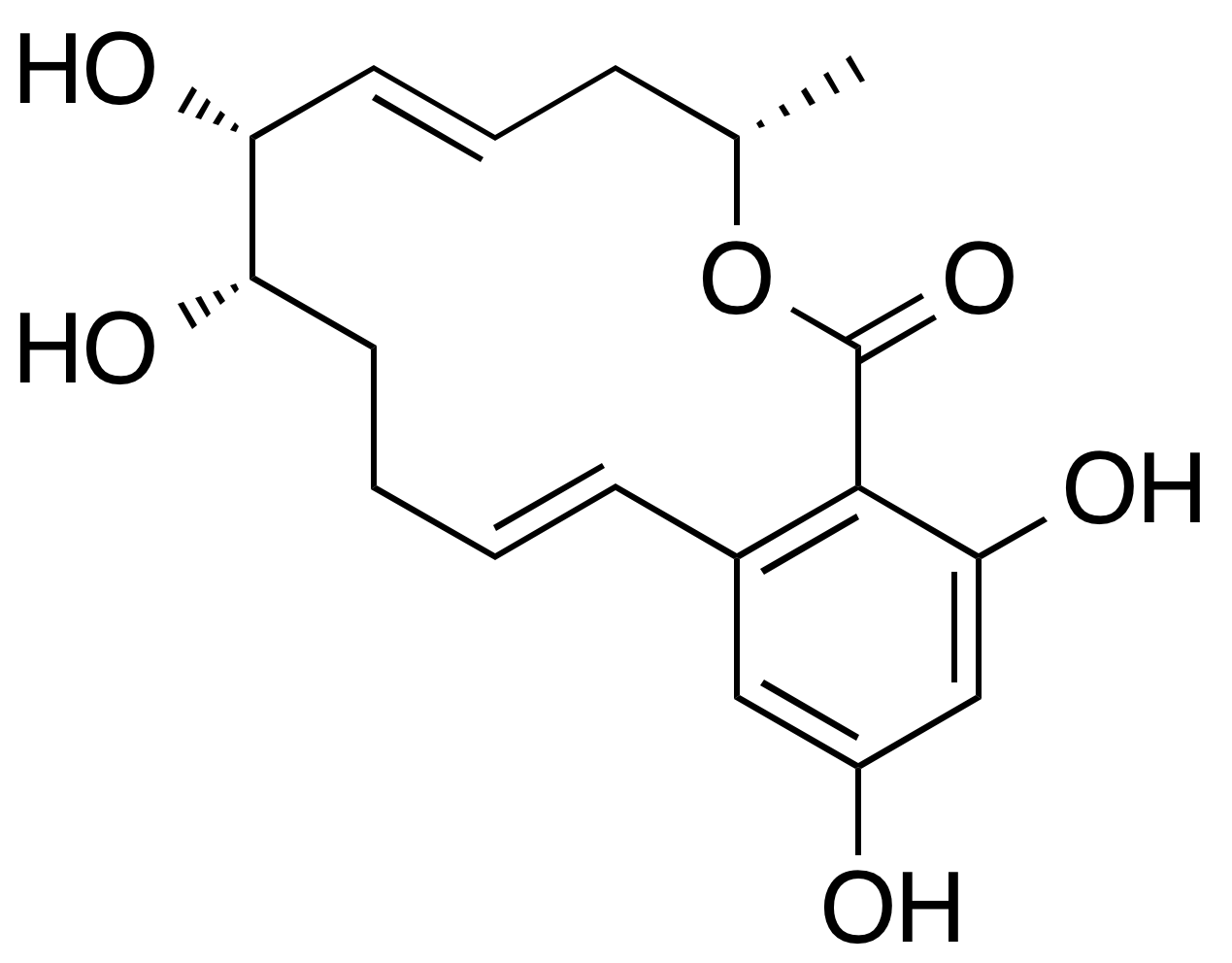

Names
- IUPAC name (4S,6E,8R,9S,12E)-8,9,16,18-Tetrahydroxy-4-methyl-3-oxabicyclo[12.4.0]octadeca-1(14),6,12,15,17-pentaen-2-one

Identifiers
CAS Number	412328-20-2
3D model (JSmol)	Interactive image
ChEBI	CHEBI:204851
ChEMBL	ChEMBL1173442
ChemSpider	9899144
PubChem CID	11724428
- InChI: InChI=1S/C18H22O6/c1-11-5-4-8-15(21)14(20)7-3-2-6-12-9-13(19)10-16(22)17(12)18(23)24-11/h2,4,6,8-11,14-15,19-22H,3,5,7H2,1H3/b6-2+,8-4+/t11-,14-,15+/m0/s1 Key: NHAQNKDEUQPSIX-DXOCLGOBSA-N
- SMILES: C[C@H]1C/C=C/[C@H]([C@H](CC/C=C/C2=C(C(=CC(=C2)O)O)C(=O)O1)O)O

Properties
Chemical formula	C_{18}H_{22}O_{6}
Molar mass	334.368 g·mol^{−1}
- Except where otherwise noted, data are given for materials in their standard state (at 25 °C [77 °F], 100 kPa). Infobox references

Aigialomycin D is a macrolide antibiotic which is produced by the fungi Aigialus parvus. Aigialomycin D is a resorcylic acid lactone and has the molecular formula C_{18}H_{22}O_{6}. Preliminary studies found that aigialomycin D is a protein kinase inhibitor with anti-tumor activity. Aigialomycin D has antimalarial activity.
