= Betaenone C =

Names
- IUPAC name (2S,3R,4R,4aS,5R,7R,8aS)-3-[(2R)-butan-2-yl]-2,7-dihydroxy-4-[(2Z)-3-hydroxyprop-2-enoyl]-2,4,5,7-tetramethyloctahydronaphthalen-1(2H)-one

Identifiers
CAS Number	85269-25-6 =
3D model (JSmol)	Interactive image
ChemSpider	10349243
PubChem CID	23244602
UNII	S651337T8I
- InChI: InChI=1S/C21H34O5/c1-7-12(2)17-20(5,15(23)8-9-22)16-13(3)10-19(4,25)11-14(16)18(24)21(17,6)26/h8-9,12-14,16-17,22,25-26H,7,10-11H2,1-6H3/b9-8-/t12-,13-,14+,16+,17-,19-,20-,21+/m1/s1 Key: YRYPVWAJOMXOHH-ITBWMFDCSA-N; InChI=1S/C21H34O5/c1-7-12(2)17-20(5,15(23)8-9-22)16-13(3)10-19(4,25)11-14(16)18(24)21(17,6)26/h8-9,12-14,16-17,22,25-26H,7,10-11H2,1-6H3/b9-8-/t12-,13-,14+,16+,17-,19-,20-,21+/m1/s1 Key: YRYPVWAJOMXOHH-ITBWMFDCSA-N
- SMILES: CC2CC(C)(O)CC(C(=O)C1(C)O)C2C(C)(C(=O)\C=C/O)C1C(C)CC

Properties
Chemical formula	C_{21}H_{34}O_{5}
Molar mass	366.498 g·mol^{−1}
- Except where otherwise noted, data are given for materials in their standard state (at 25 °C [77 °F], 100 kPa). verify (what is ?) Infobox references

Betaenone C, like other betaenones (A and B), is a secondary metabolite isolated from the fungus Pleospora betae, a plant pathogen. Of the seven phytotoxins isolated in fungal leaf spots from sugar beet (Beta vulgaris), it showed 89% growth inhibition. Betaenone C has been shown to act by inhibiting RNA and protein synthesis.
