= Massariosphaeria =

Scientific classification
- Kingdom: Fungi
- Division: Ascomycota
- Class: Dothideomycetes
- Order: Pleosporales
- Family: Lophiostomataceae
- Genus: Massariosphaeria (E. Müll.) Crivelli

Type species
- Massariosphaeria phaeospora (E. Müll.) Crivelli

Genus of fungi

Massariosphaeria is a genus of fungi in the family Lophiostomataceae.

== Species ==
- Massariosphaeria adrianii
- Massariosphaeria alpigena
- Massariosphaeria autumnalis
- Massariosphaeria clavispora
- Massariosphaeria compositarum
- Massariosphaeria erucacea
- Massariosphaeria grandispora
- Massariosphaeria massarioides
- Massariosphaeria megaspora
- Massariosphaeria melicae
- Massariosphaeria moricola
- Massariosphaeria mosana
- Massariosphaeria multiseptata
- Massariosphaeria pakistana
- Massariosphaeria palustris
- Massariosphaeria phaeospora
- Massariosphaeria pusillispora
- Massariosphaeria roumeguerei
- Massariosphaeria scabrispora
- Massariosphaeria scirpina
- Massariosphaeria thurgoviensis
- Massariosphaeria triseptata
- Massariosphaeria typhicola
- Massariosphaeria vitalbae
