= Dysaphis karyakini =

Scientific classification
- Kingdom: Animalia
- Phylum: Arthropoda
- Class: Insecta
- Order: Hemiptera
- Suborder: Sternorrhyncha
- Family: Aphididae
- Genus: Dysaphis
- Species: D. karyakini

Binomial name
- Dysaphis karyakini Stekolshchikov & Buga, 2018

Species of true bug

Dysaphis karyakini is a species of aphid found near Luvenga, Murmansk Oblast, Russia. It was named in honor of Russian ornithologist A. S. Koryakin (1954–2014). The species was described in 2018.
