= Luvenga =

Luvenga Лувеньга
- Selo
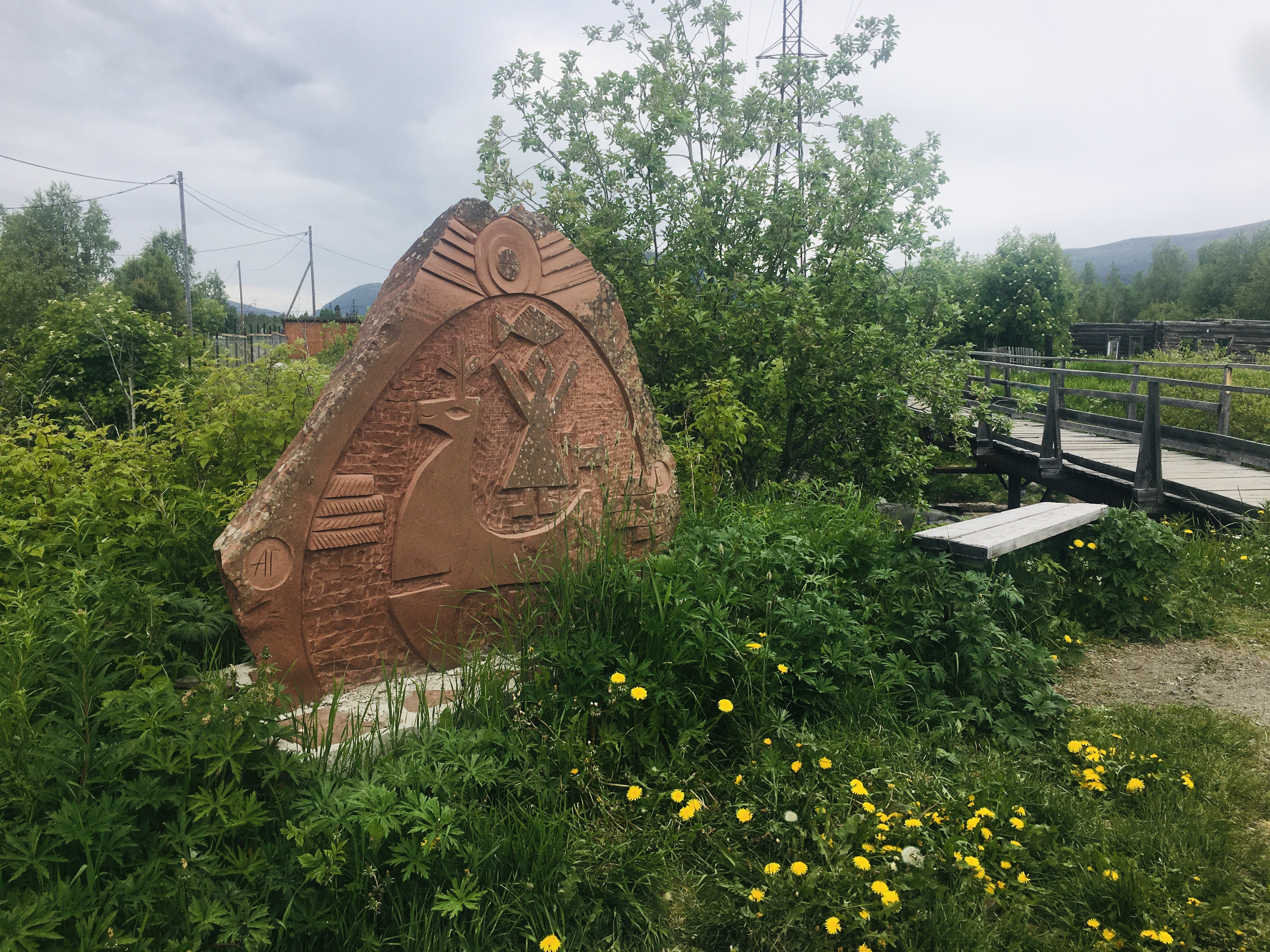
- Interactive map of Luvenga
- Location of Luvenga Luvenga (Murmansk Oblast)
- Coordinates: 67°06′13″N 32°42′24″E
- Country: Russia
- Federal subject: Murmansk Oblast
- Administrative district: Kandalakshsky District
- Territorial OkrugSelsoviet: Luvengsky Territorial Okrug

Population (2010 Census)
  - Total: 575
  - Estimate (2021): 423 (−26.4%)

Municipal status
  - Municipal district: Kandalakshsky Municipal District
  - Urban settlement: Kandalaksha Urban Settlement
- Time zone: UTC+3 (MSK)
- Postal code: 184015
- Dialing code: +7 81533
- OKTMO ID: 47608101106

Luvenga (Russian: Лувеньга, Karelian: Luivinka) is a rural locality (a selo) in Kandalakshsky District of Murmansk Oblast, Russia, located beyond the Arctic Circle at a height of 30 meters (98 ft) above sea level. Population: 575 (2010 Census). Dysaphis karyakini was first found in this region.

Luvenga is located at the mouth of the eponymous river Luvenga. Its source is located in the Yolki-Tundry hills about 300 meters (980 ft) above sea level and it ultimately discharges into the Kandalaksha Gulf of the White Sea. The river's name is of Kildin Sámi origin, being derived from a word meaning 'to shake; to rock'. A temporary fishing settlement has existed at the mouth of the Luvenga since the 16th century.

In 1926, the village had 23 inhabitants, of whom all but one were ethnic Karelians. Udmurts began moving into the village sometime before World War II, and during the 1970s and 1980s, Luvenga was seen as an Udmurt village.
