= Mitsutaro Shirai =

Mitsutaro Shirai 1863–1932.

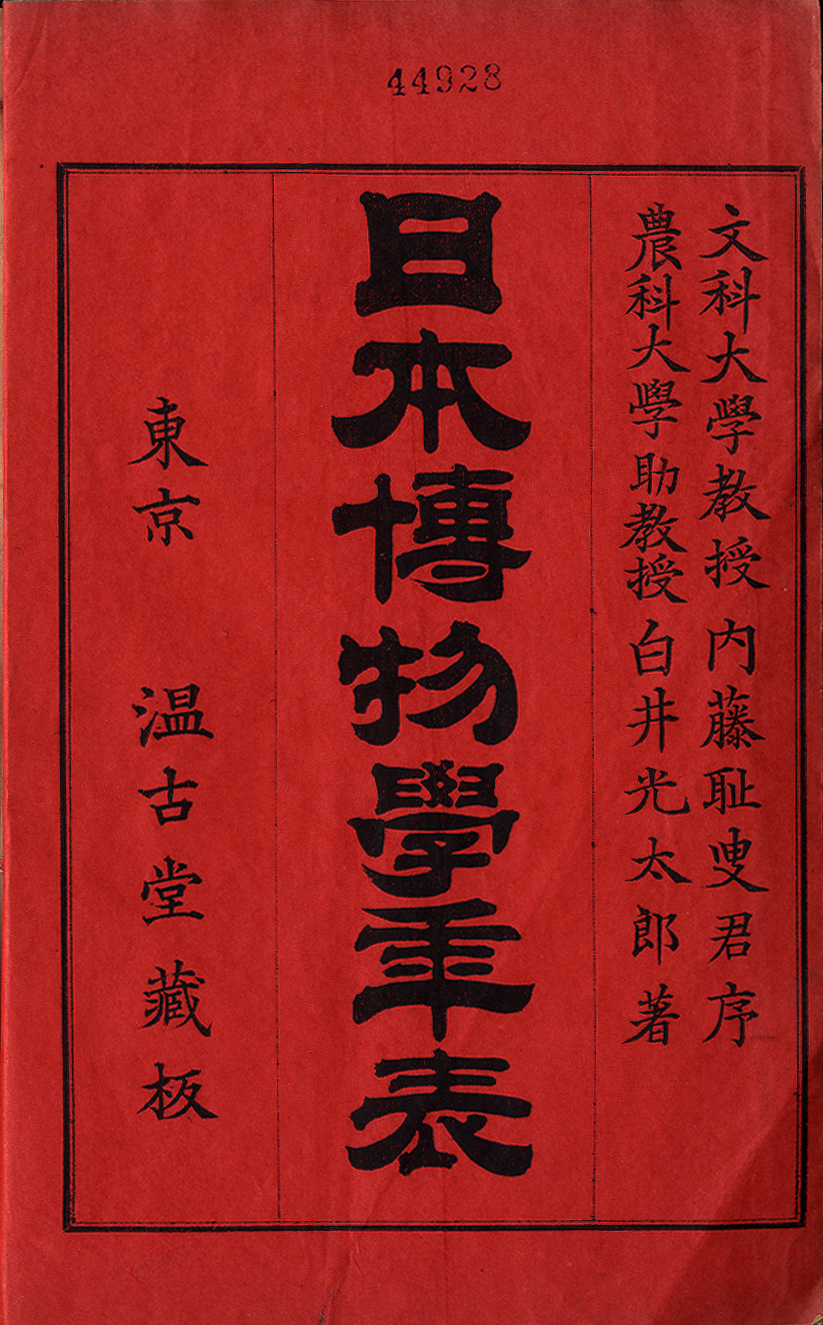
Shirai Mitsutarō: A chronological table of natural history in Japan. (First edition, 1891)

Mitsutarō Shirai (白井 光太郎; also styled 'Kōtarō' Shirai, 1863-1932) was a Japanese plant pathologist, mycologist, and herbalist. He was the first president of the Phytopathology Society of Japan and emeritus professor of plant pathology, College of Agriculture, The University of Tokyo.

He worked closely together with the German mycologist P. Hennings in the identification of fungi. In commemoration of his contribution, two fungi genera were named after his family name, i.e. Shiraia P. Henn. and Shiraiella Hara and more than a dozen of species were named after him. He also published about 50 fungi species, either by himself or in cooperation with other mycologists. Shirai made great contributions to Japanese mycology and plant pathology at his time.

He is also known for his contributions to the history of natural studies in Japan using his private collection of traditional Japanese and Chinese manuscripts and books. His Li Shizhen's Compendium of Materia Medica (Bencao Gangmu) is now part of the Omori Collection of the Kyoto Botanical Garden.

== Life ==
Shirai was born in Edo (now Tokyo). He began his professional career as teacher of forest botany and plant pathology in the University of Tokyo in 1886. From 1906 to 1925, he occupied the first term of professor at Laboratory of Plant Pathology in this university. He died on May 30, 1932.

== Work ==
- Kimura Yōjirō (ed.). Shirai Mitsutarō chosaku-shū [Collected Writings of Shirai Mitsutarō]. Vol. 1–6, Tokyo: Kagaku Shoin, 1985–90.
- Shirai Mitsutaro. A Brief History of Botany in Old Japan. In: Scientific Japan - Past and Present. Tokyo: National Research Council of Japan, 1926, S. 213-227 (BHL)

== Literature ==
- Sakai Shigeyasu. History of Plant Pathology in Japan. Annual Review of Phytopathology, Vol. 12: 13-26 (September 1974)
- Geoffrey C. Ainsworth. Introduction to the history of plant pathology. Cambridge University Press, 1981.
