= Didymocrea =

Scientific classification
- Kingdom: Fungi
- Division: Ascomycota
- Class: Dothideomycetes
- Order: Pleosporales
- Family: Zopfiaceae
- Genus: Didymocrea; Kowalsky

Type species
- Didymocrea sadasivanii (T.K.R. Reddy) Kowalski

Genus of fungi

Didymocrea is a genus of fungi in the family Zopfiaceae; according to the 2007 Outline of Ascomycota, the placement in this family is uncertain. This is a monotypic genus, containing the single species Didymocrea sadasivanii.
