= Betaenone B =

Chemical compound

Clinical data
- ATC code: none

Identifiers
- IUPAC name: (2S,3R,4R,4aS,5R,7R,8aS)-3-sec-butyl-2,7-dihydroxy-4-(3-hydroxypropanoyl)-2,4,5,7-tetramethyloctahydronaphthalen-1(2H)-one
- CAS Number: 85269-23-4
- PubChem CID: 158750
- ChemSpider: 139645
- UNII: C9873620HS
- CompTox Dashboard (EPA): DTXSID40234463

Chemical and physical data
- Formula: C_{21}H_{36}O_{5}
- Molar mass: 368.514 g·mol^{−1}
- 3D model (JSmol): Interactive image
- Melting point: 103.5 to 108 °C (218.3 to 226.4 °F)
- SMILES: O=C(CCO)[C@]2([C@H]([C@](O)(C(=O)[C@@H]1[C@@H]2[C@@H](C[C@@](O)(C1)C)C)C)[C@H](C)CC)C
- InChI: InChI=1S/C21H36O5/c1-7-12(2)17-20(5,15(23)8-9-22)16-13(3)10-19(4,25)11-14(16)18(24)21(17,6)26/h12-14,16-17,22,25-26H,7-11H2,1-6H3/t12-,13-,14+,16+,17-,19-,20-,21+/m1/s1; Key:PUZNAAVWFXQUDM-HBKHSIGZSA-N

Betaenone B, like other betaenones (A and C), is a secondary metabolite isolated from the fungus Pleospora betae, a plant pathogen. Its phytotoxic properties have been shown to cause sugar beet leaf spots, which is characterized by black, pycnidia containing, concentric circles eventually leading to necrosis of the leaf tissue. Of the seven phytotoxins isolated in fungal leaf spots from sugar beet (Beta vulgaris), betaenone B showed the least phytotoxicity showing only 8% inhibition of growth while betaenone A and C showed 73% and 89% growth inhibition, respectively. Betaenone B is therefore not considered toxic to the plant, but will produce leaf spots when present in high concentrations (0.33 μg/μL). While the mechanism of action of betaenone B has yet to be elucidated, betaenone C has been shown to inhibit RNA and protein synthesis. Most of the major work on betaenone B, including the initial structure elucidation of betaenone A, B and C as well as the partial elucidation mechanism of biosynthesis, was presented in three short papers published between 1983 and 1988. The compounds were found to inhibit a variety of protein kinases signifying a possible role in cancer treatment.

The structure of betaenone B was determined via nuclear magnetic resonance spectroscopy (NMR), CD and optical rotatory dispersion (ORD) measurements. While it was also shown that betaenone B could be converted to betaenone A by oxidation by PCC followed by exposure to base, it wasn't until 1988 that a semi-complete total synthesis was reported. Using 1,3-butadiene as a starting material, a stereoselective synthesis of (+/-)-4-de(3'-hydroxypropionyl) betanenone B was achieved in a 24-step synthesis. Bioactivity of this synthetic product was not tested and no further work on total synthesis of betaenones has been published since.

While a complete de novo synthesis of betaenone B has yet to be reported, Daniel Pratt and Paul Hopkins in 1988 proposed a method for synthesizing a precursor of betaenone B from methoxybenzoquinone and 1,3-butadiene via a Diels–Alder reaction and Claisen chemistry.

== Biosynthesis ==
Very little work has been done to elucidate the biosynthetic pathways of betaenones with almost no literature references published on the subject since 1988. Their low phytotoxicity and lack of biological significance in human physiology has provoked a fairly small amount of interest in these compounds. The backbone carbon units of betaenone B are known to be synthesized via the polyketide synthesis (PKS) pathway. The backbone is synthesized through the addition of two carbon units via addition of acetate units from acetyl-CoA. The 5 methyl groups are added via S-adenosyl methionine (SAM) methylation, as opposed to incorporation of propionate (instead of acetate) to the growing compound during biosynthesis. The following internal cyclization proceeds through a Diels–Alder reaction catalyzed by an unknown enzyme. The origin of the subsequent oxidations at positions 1, 2 and 8 have yet to be characterized, but they have been shown not to originate from acetate. It has been theorized that cytochrome P-450 is responsible for the oxidation at these three positions since its inhibition produces probetaenone 1, the non-oxidized form of betaenone B.
