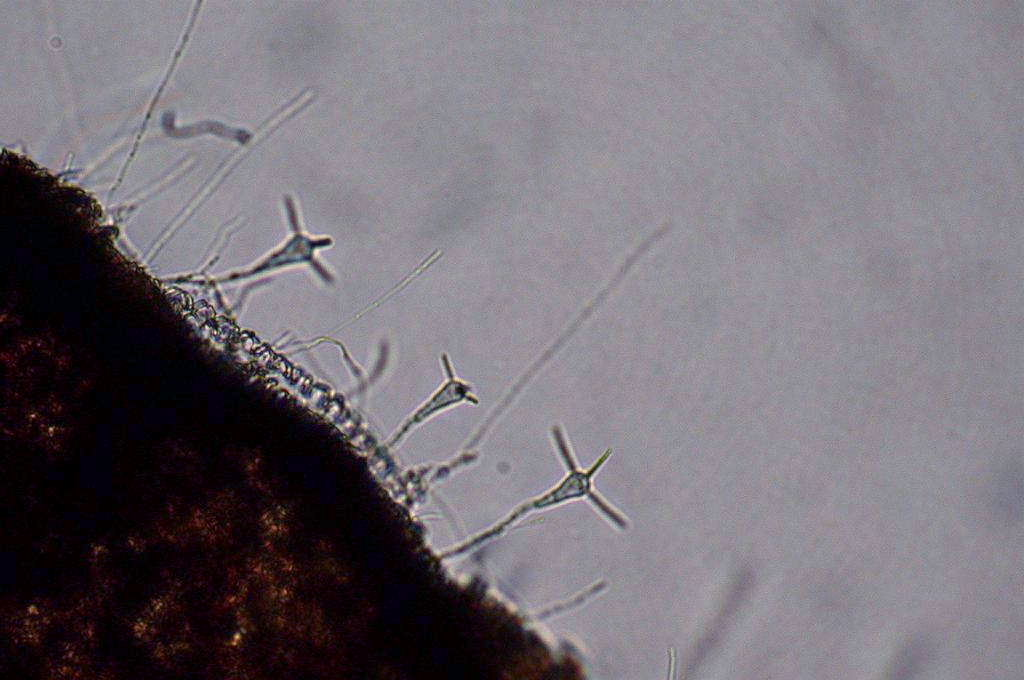
- Clavariopsis aquatica

Scientific classification
- Kingdom: Fungi
- Division: Ascomycota
- Class: Dothideomycetes
- Order: Pleosporales
- Genus: Clavariopsis; De Wild., 1895

= Clavariopsis =

Genus of fungi

Clavariopsis is a genus of fungi that is known for living in aquatic environments. It is form-classified as an aquatic hyphomycete, and is connected to freshwater streams. It is not known to live anywhere outside aquatic systems. Clavariopsis lives off decomposing leaves in streams, and Lignocellulose-Decomposing Enzymes are identified in the genus. These enzymes break down plant molecules, and Clavariopsis thus plays an important role in nutrient cycling in rivers.

Clavariopsis is a near-cosmopolitan genus of fungi belonging to the order Pleosporales, but the family is unknown. Clavariopsis aquatica was the first species described of the genus, and was one of the first aquatic hyphomycetes ever described.

Species:

- Clavariopsis aquatica DeWild.
- Clavariopsis azlanii Nawawi
- Clavariopsis brachycladia Tubaki
- Clavariopsis bulbosa Anastasiou
- Clavariopsis tenuis Anon.
