= Giovanni Passerini =

Italian botanist and entomologist

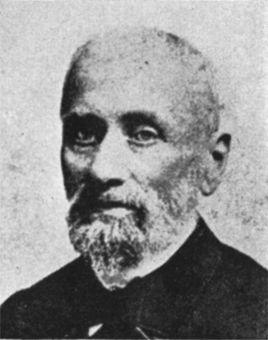
Giovanni Passerini.

Giovanni Passerini was an Italian botanist and entomologist, born on June 16, 1816, in Pieve di Guastalla. He died on April 17, 1893, in Parma .

In 1836 he studied medicine at the University of Parma, where from 1844 onward, he was a professor of botany and director of the Orto Botanico di Parma. He is the author of several works on the aphids. His collection, of 5,500 specimens in 52 genera kinds and 89 species, is in the natural history museum of the University of Parma.

In 1875, he was the first president of the Italian-Parma section of the Alpine Club (Club Alpino Italiano a Parma). With Vincenzo de Cesati and Giuseppe Gibelli, he was co-author of a compendium of Italian flora, titled "Compendio della flora italiana".

In 1875 Pier Andrea Saccardo named the fungal genus Passerinula in his honor. Then in 1892, Augusto Napoleone Berlese named the fungal genus Passeriniella in his honor as well.

== Major works ==
- Gli insetti autori delle galle del Terebinto e del Lentisco insieme ad alcune specie congeneri. Giornale Giardini Orticolt. 3: 258–265 (1856).
- Gli afidi con un prospetto dei generi ed alcune specie nuove Italiane. Parma : Tipografia Carmignani 40 pp. (1860).
- Aphididae Italicae hucusque observatae. Arch. Zool. Anat. Fisiol. 2: 129–212 (1863).
