= Caryospora (fungus) =

Scientific classification
- Domain: Eukaryota
- Kingdom: Fungi
- Division: Ascomycota
- Class: Dothideomycetes
- Order: Pleosporales
- Family: Zopfiaceae
- Genus: Caryospora; De Not.

Type species
- Caryospora putaminum (Schwein.) De Not.

Genus of fungi

Caryospora is a genus of fungi in the family Zopfiaceae.
