= Tetraplosphaeriaceae =

Scientific classification
- Kingdom: Fungi
- Division: Ascomycota
- Class: Dothideomycetes
- Order: Pleosporales
- Family: Tetraplosphaeriaceae; Kaz. Tanaka & K. Hiray. (2009)

Genera
- Polyplosphaeria; Pseudotetraploa; Quadricrura; Tetraplosphaeria; Triplosphaeria

Family of fungi

The Tetraplosphaeriaceae are a family of fungi in the order Pleosporales.
