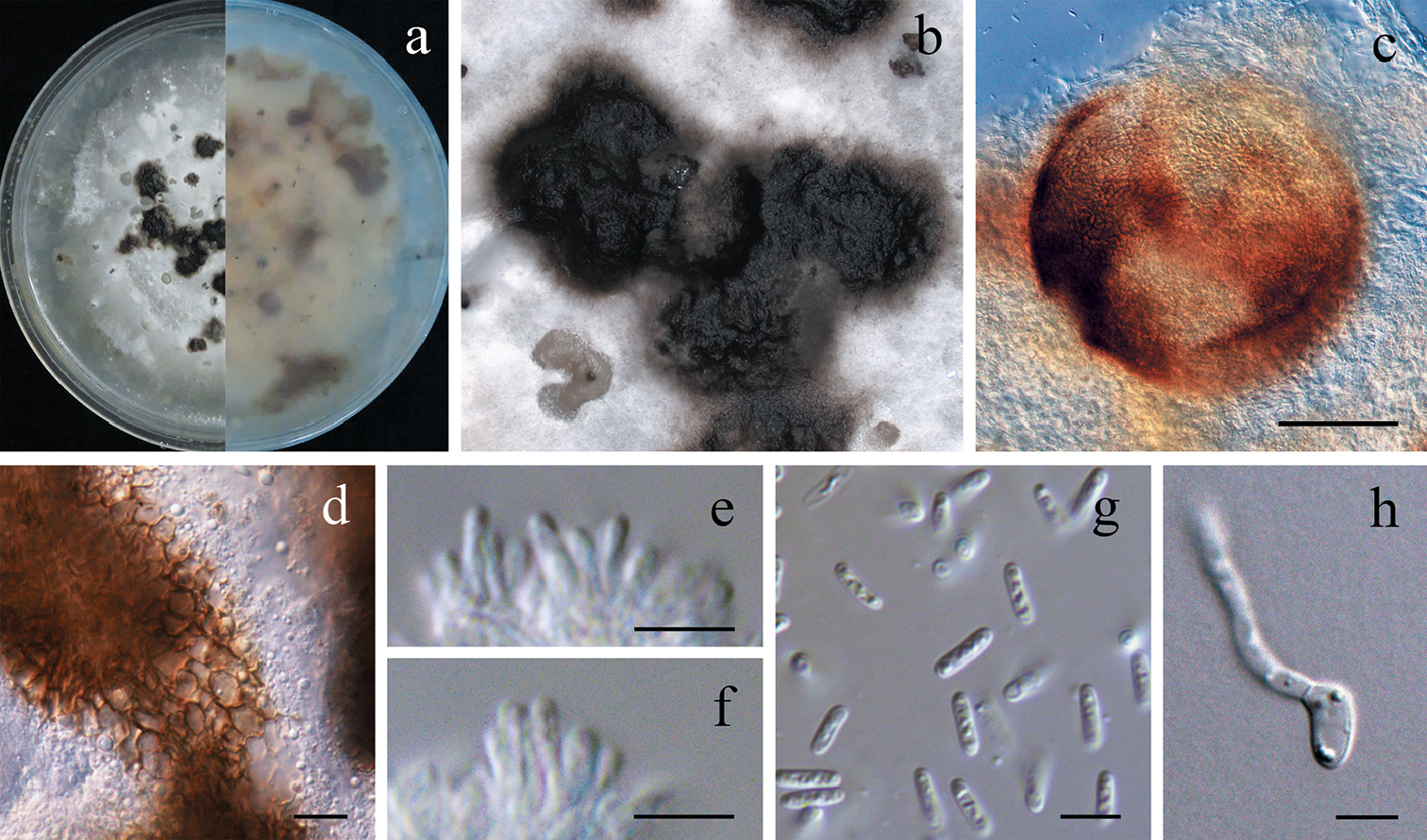

Scientific classification
- Domain: Eukaryota
- Kingdom: Fungi
- Division: Ascomycota
- Class: Dothideomycetes
- Order: Pleosporales
- Family: Tzeananiaceae; H.A. Ariyaw., A.J.L. Phillips & Chuang
- Genus: Tzeanania; H.A. Ariyaw., A.J.L. Phillips & Chuang
- Species: T. taiwanensis

Binomial name
- Tzeanania taiwanensis H.A. Ariyaw., A.J.L. Phillips & Chuang (2018)

= Tzeanania =

Family of fungi

Tzeanania is a monotypic genus of fungi established in 2018. It is the only genus in the family Tzeananiaceae and contains the single species Tzeanania taiwanensis. The species is a parasite which grows on fruiting bodies of the fungus Ophiocordyceps macroacicularis, which is itself a parasite of moth larvae. So far it is only known from one collection which was made in Taiwan.

Within the order Pleosporales, it is quite like the common soil genus Phoma, which has asexual spores produced in similar conidia with a glassy appearance, and forming inside structures called pycnidia. However the results of DNA analysis were considered to justify the definition of a new family for this species.

The genus was named for the Taiwanese mycologist Shean-Shong Tzean.
