= Anguillospora =

Scientific classification
- Kingdom: Fungi
- Division: Ascomycota
- Class: Dothideomycetes
- Order: Pleosporales
- Family: Amniculicolaceae
- Genus: Anguillospora; Ingold (1942)

Type species
- Anguillospora longissima (Sacc. & P.Syd.) Ingold (1942)

Genus of fungi

Anguillospora is a genus of fungi belonging to the family Amniculicolaceae. It was circumscribed by Cecil Terence Ingold in 1942, with Anguillospora longissima assigned as the type species. It was found as a root endophytic fungus in the plant Equisetum scirpoides. It is related to the genera Amniculicola and Lophiostoma. The genus has a cosmopolitan distribution.

== Species ==
As of January 2022, Species Fungorum accepts 11 species of Anguillospora.

- Anguillospora crassa Ingold (1958)
- Anguillospora curvula S.H.Iqbal (1972)
- Anguillospora filiformis Greath. (1961)
- Anguillospora furtiva J.Webster & Descals (1999)
- Anguillospora gigantea Ranzoni (1953)
- Anguillospora mediocris Gönczöl & Marvanová (2002)
- Anguillospora pseudolongissima Ranzoni (1953)
- Anguillospora pulchella Wolfe (1976)
- Anguillospora rubescens Gulis & Marvanová (1999)
- Anguillospora virginiana Wolfe (1976)
