= Pontoporeia (fungus) =

Scientific classification
- Kingdom: Fungi
- Division: Ascomycota
- Class: Dothideomycetes
- Order: Pleosporales
- Family: Zopfiaceae
- Genus: Pontoporeia; Kohlm.

Genus of fungi

Pontoporeia is a genus of fungi in the family Zopfiaceae.
