= Salsuginea =

Scientific classification
- Kingdom: Fungi
- Division: Ascomycota
- Class: Dothideomycetes
- Order: Pleosporales
- Family: Salsugineaceae; K.D.Hyde & Tibpromma
- Genus: Salsuginea; K.D.Hyde

Type species
- Salsuginea ramicola K.D.Hyde

Genus of fungi

Salsuginea is a genus of fungi in the class Dothideomycetes. The relationship of this taxon to other taxa within the class was unknown (incertae sedis) in 2007. Until Kevin D. Hyde & Tibpromma, 2013 introduced family Salsugineaceae within the order of Pleosporales.

It was a monotypic genus, it contained the single species Salsuginea ramicola until 3 more species were found in 2009, 2019 and 2020.

Salsuginea ramicola and other fungi genera (including Aniptodera salsuginosa) have been found on decaying woody substrata in intertidal mangrove forests within Thailand.

== Species ==
As accepted by Species Fungorum;

- Salsuginea phoenicis S.N. Zhang, E.B.G. Jones, K.D. Hyde & J.K. Liu (2019)
- Salsuginea ramicola K.D. Hyde (1991)
- Salsuginea rhizophorae Dayar., E.B.G. Jones & K.D. Hyde (2020)
