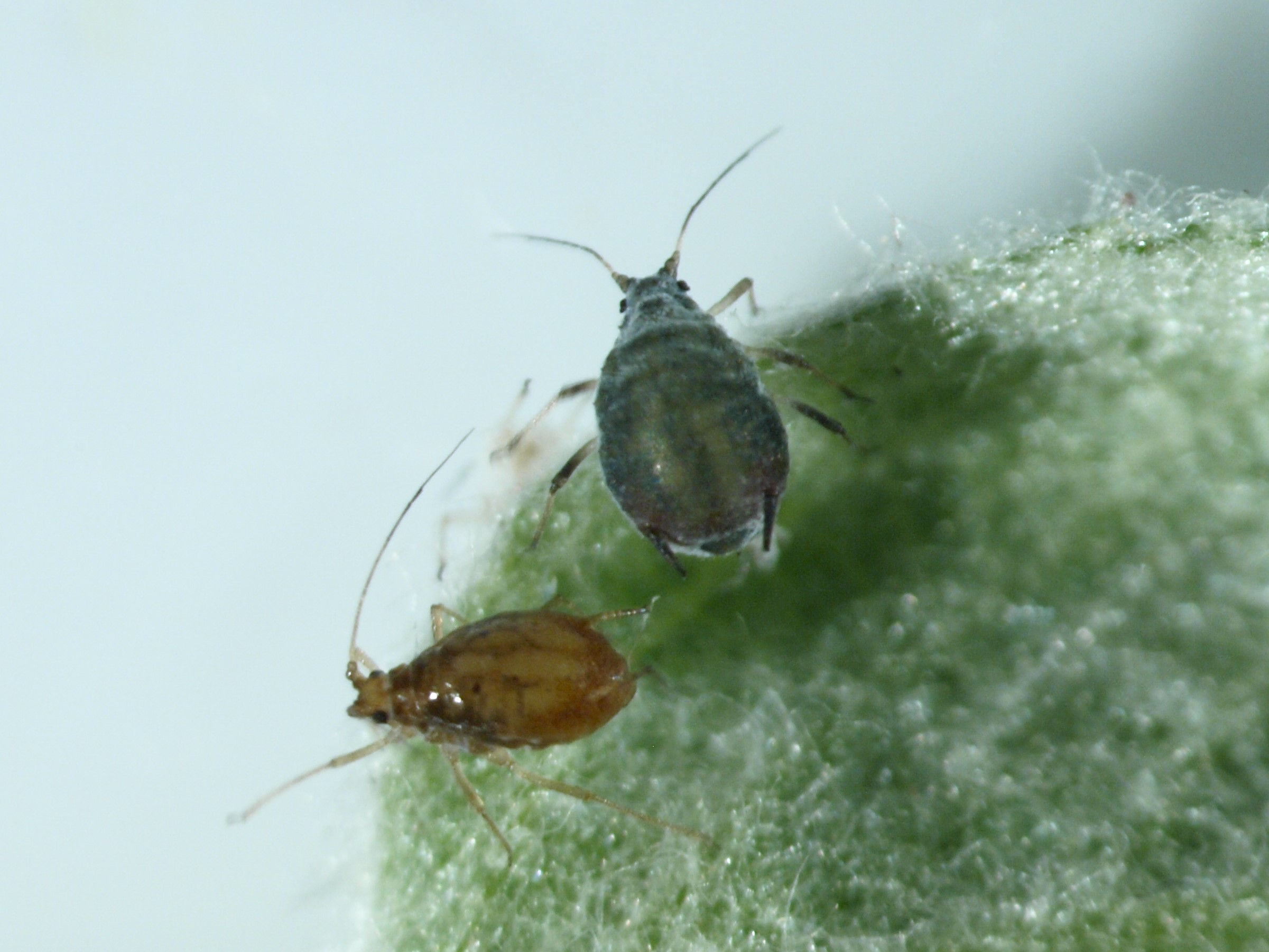
- Dysaphis plantaginea

Scientific classification
- Domain: Eukaryota
- Kingdom: Animalia
- Phylum: Arthropoda
- Class: Insecta
- Order: Hemiptera
- Suborder: Sternorrhyncha
- Family: Aphididae
- Subtribe: Anuraphidina
- Genus: Dysaphis; Börner, 1931

= Dysaphis =

Genus of true bugs

Dysaphis is a genus of over 100 aphids found in Europe, North America and Australia.

== Species ==
The following species are recognised in the genus Dysaphis:

- Dysaphis acroptilidis
- Dysaphis affinis (Mordvilko, 1928)
- Dysaphis allii
- Dysaphis angelicae (C.L.Koch, 1854)
- Dysaphis angelicophaga Zhang, Guangxue, Xiaolin Chen, Tiesen Zhong & Jing
- Dysaphis anisoidis Barbagallo & Stroyan, 1982
- Dysaphis annulata (Börner, 1950)
- Dysaphis anthrisci Börner, 1950)
- Dysaphis apiifolia (F.V.Theobald, 1923)
- Dysaphis ariae (Börner, 1950)
- Dysaphis armeniaca
- Dysaphis atina A.K.Ghosh, R.C.Basu & D.N.Raychaudhuri, 1969
- Dysaphis aucupariae (Buckton, 1879)
- Dysaphis bonomii (Hille Ris Lambers, 1935)
- Dysaphis brachycyclica
- Dysaphis brancoi Börner, 1950)
- Dysaphis brevirostris Börner, 1950)
- Dysaphis bunii Shaposhnikov, 1956
- Dysaphis candicans (Passerini, 1879)
- Dysaphis capsellae
- Dysaphis caucasica
- Dysaphis centaureae (Börner, 1950)
- Dysaphis cephalariae
- Dysaphis cephalarioides Shaposhnikov, 1956
- Dysaphis chaerophylli (Börner, 1940)
- Dysaphis chaerophyllina Shaposhnikov, 1959
- Dysaphis cnidii Shaposhnikov & Stekolshchikov, 1989
- Dysaphis cousiniae
- Dysaphis crataegi (Kaltenbach, 1843)
- Dysaphis crathaegaria (Del Guercio, 1930)
- Dysaphis crathaegiphila (Del Guercio, 1930)
- Dysaphis crithmi (Buckton, 1886)
- Dysaphis deltoidei Shaposhnikov & Stekolshchikov, 1989
- Dysaphis devecta (F.Walker, 1849)
- Dysaphis eremuri
- Dysaphis ferulae (Nevsky, 1929)
- Dysaphis flava Shaposhnikov, 1956
- Dysaphis fluviovis
- Dysaphis foeniculus (F.V.Theobald, 1923)
- Dysaphis gallica (Hille Ris Lambers, 1955)
- Dysaphis handeliae
- Dysaphis henrystroyani Barbagallo & Patti, 1994
- Dysaphis hirsutissima (Börner, 1940)
- Dysaphis hissarica
- Dysaphis incognita Shaposhnikov & Moralev, 1978
- Dysaphis indica
- Dysaphis inulae Rezwani, 2008
- Dysaphis kadyrovi Depa & Kanturski, 2017
- Dysaphis karyakini Stekolshchikov & Buga, 2018
- Dysaphis lappae (C.L.Koch, 1854)
- Dysaphis laserpitii (Börner, 1950)
- Dysaphis lauberti (Börner, 1940)
- Dysaphis leefmansi (Hille Ris Lambers, 1954)
- Dysaphis libanotidis Shaposhnikov, 1956
- Dysaphis ligulariae
- Dysaphis longipilosa
- Dysaphis malidauci
- Dysaphis maritima (Hille Ris Lambers, 1955)
- Dysaphis microsiphon (Nevsky, 1929)
- Dysaphis mordvilkoi
- Dysaphis multisetosa A.N.Basu, 1969
- Dysaphis munirae
- Dysaphis narzikulovi Shaposhnikov, 1956
- Dysaphis neostroyani Ilharco, 1965
- Dysaphis newskyi (Börner, 1940)
- Dysaphis oreoselini Szelegiewicz, 1982
- Dysaphis orientalis
- Dysaphis papillata
- Dysaphis parasorbi (Börner, 1952)
- Dysaphis pavlovskyana Narzikulov, 1957
- Dysaphis peucedani Szelegiewicz, 1982
- Dysaphis pimpinellae
- Dysaphis plantaginea (Passerini, 1860)
- Dysaphis plantaginis (Pasek, 1955)
- Dysaphis pseudomolli
- Dysaphis pulverina (Nevsky, 1929)
- Dysaphis pyraria
- Dysaphis pyri (Boyer de Fonscolombe, 1841)
- Dysaphis radicivorans (Nevsky, 1929)
- Dysaphis radicola (Mordvilko, 1897)
- Dysaphis ramani
- Dysaphis ranunculi (Kaltenbach, 1843)
- Dysaphis rara Shaposhnikov, 1987
- Dysaphis reaumuri
- Dysaphis rumecicola (Hori, 1927)
- Dysaphis selinumi
- Dysaphis seselii Vaskovskaya, 1979
- Dysaphis shaposhnikovi Stekolshchikov, 1998
- Dysaphis sharmai
- Dysaphis sibirica
- Dysaphis sorbi (Kaltenbach, 1843)
- Dysaphis sorbiarum
- Dysaphis tadzhikistanica
- Dysaphis taisetsusana (Miyazaki, 1971)
- Dysaphis taraxaci
- Dysaphis tschildarensis
- Dysaphis tulipae (Boyer de Fonscolombe, 1841)
- Dysaphis ubsanurensis
- Dysaphis unicauli
- Dysaphis uralensis Shaposhnikov, 1956
- Dysaphis ussuriensis Shaposhnikov & Stekolshchikov, 1989
- Dysaphis vandenboschi Stroyan, 1972
- Dysaphis viennoti G.Remaudière, 1989
- Dysaphis virgata
- Dysaphis zini Shaposhnikov, 1956
- BOLD:AAK9769 (Dysaphis sp.)
- BOLD:ACB7196 (Dysaphis sp.)
- BOLD:ACO7881 (Dysaphis sp.)
- BOLD:ACR3448 (Dysaphis sp.)
