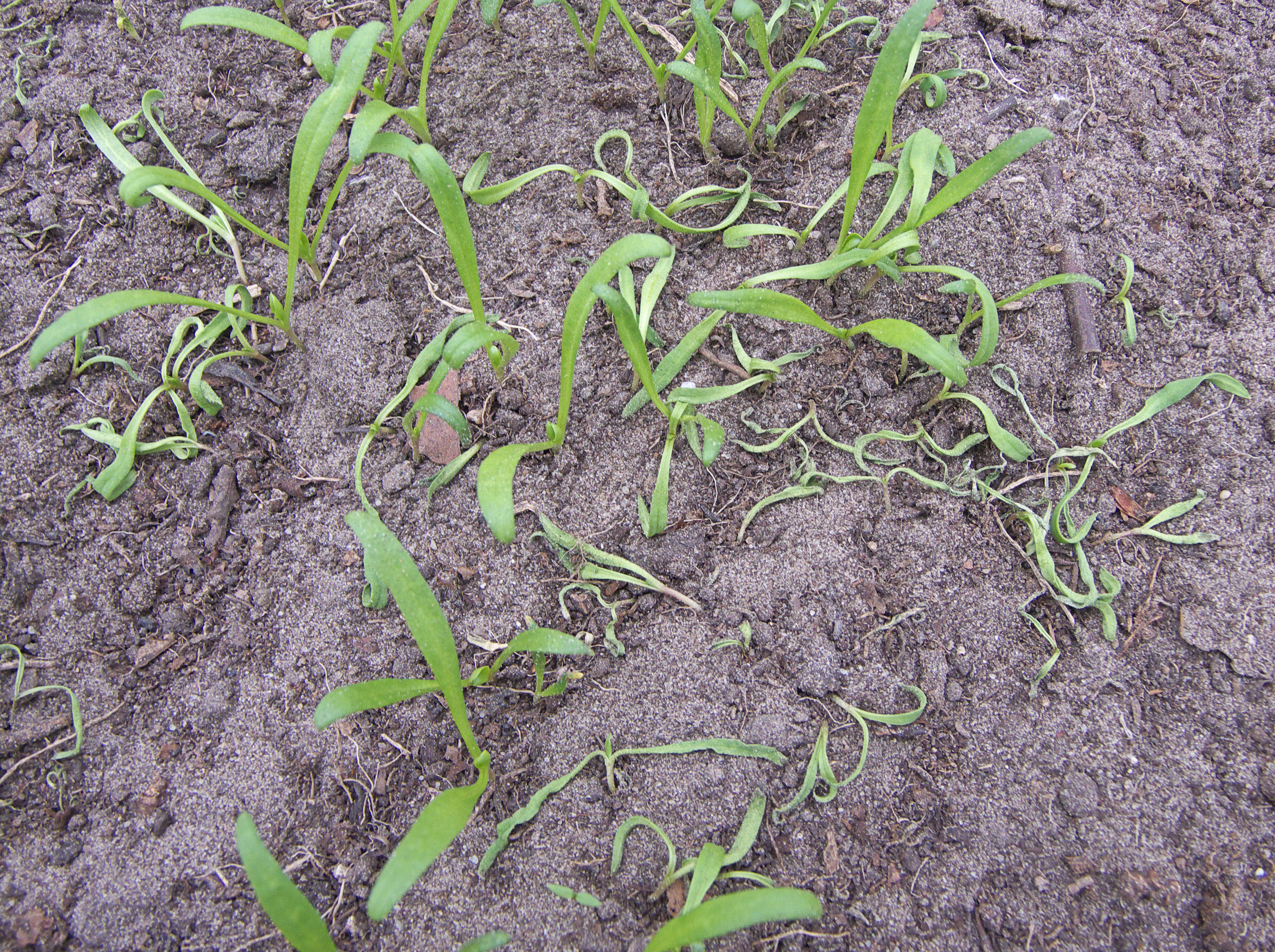
- Neocamarosporium betae (syn Pleospora betae) on spinach

Scientific classification
- Kingdom: Fungi
- Division: Ascomycota
- Class: Dothideomycetes
- Order: Pleosporales
- Family: Neocamarosporiaceae
- Genus: Neocamarosporium
- Species: N. betae

Binomial name
- Neocamarosporium betae (Berl.) Ariyaw. & K.D. Hyde

Synonyms
- Phoma betae A.B. Frank, Z. Rubenzuch. 42: 903 (1892); Phoma spinaciae Bubák & K. Krieg., in Bubák, Annls mycol. 10(1): 47 (1912); Phoma tabifica (Prill.) Sacc., Syll. fung. (Abellini) 10: 180 (1892); Phyllosticta betae Oudem., Ned. kruidk. Archf, 2 sér. 2: 181 (1877); Phyllosticta spinaciae H. Zimm., Verh. nat. Ver. Brünn 47: 87 (1909); Phyllosticta tabifica Prill., Bull. Soc. mycol. Fr. 7: 19 (1891); Pleospora betae Björl., Bot. Notiser: 218 (1944); Pleospora betae (Berl.) Nevod., Griby rossi exsiccati: no. 247 (1915); Pleospora bjoerlingii Byford, Trans. Br. mycol. Soc. 46(4): 614 (1963); Pyrenophora echinella var. betae Berl., Nuovo G. bot. ital. 20(2): 208 (1888)

= Neocamarosporium betae =

Species of fungus

Neocamarosporium betae is a plant pathogen infecting Beta vulgaris (beet) and causes Phoma leaf spot. It was originally published and described in 1877 as Pleospora betae before being resolved as Neocamarosporium betae (Berl.) Ariyaw. & K.D. Hyde in 2015. It also causes leaf spot on Spinach plants.

It contains the chemical substances betaenone A, B and C. Pleospora betae develops on dead beet residues and is a marsupial stage of the Phoma betae anamorph, parasitizing on beets and causing a number of harmful diseases.
