= Cheiromoniliophora =

Scientific classification
- Kingdom: Fungi
- Division: Ascomycota
- Class: Dothideomycetes
- Order: Pleosporales
- Family: Dictyosporiaceae
- Genus: Cheiromoniliophora; Tzean & J.L. Chen 1990

Species
- Cheiromoniliophora elegans Tzean & J. L. Chen 1990; Cheiromoniliophora gracilis R. F. Castañeda, Guarro & Cano 1997

Genus of fungi

Cheiromoniliophora is a genus of fungi in the order Pleosporales in the class Dothideomycetes.
