= Trematosphaeriaceae =

Scientific classification
- Kingdom: Fungi
- Division: Ascomycota
- Class: Dothideomycetes
- Order: Pleosporales
- Family: Trematosphaeriaceae; K.D.Hyde, Y. Zhang ter, Suetrong & E.B.G. Jones, 2013, Families of dothideomycetes. Fungal Diversity 63(1): 1–313.

Family of fungi

The Trematosphaeriaceae are a family of fungi in the order of Pleosporales. They are found world-wide with the greatest contributions found in Europe and Australia. It includes taxa that are found in the marine environment, such as Falciformispora lignatis which can be found in freshwater and marine habitats. Most are saprobic species (living on dead tissue).

Trematosphaeriaceae was introduced by Suetrong et al. (2011) to include the genera Falciformispora, Halomassarina and Trematosphaeria. The main distinguishing characters of the family are medium-sized rounded ascomata with a papillate ostiole (spore ejecting hole), a relatively wide, coriaceous peridium (protectivve layer), cellular pseudoparaphyses and cylindro-clavate asci. The ascospores are two-celled or many celled, hyaline (glass-like) or brown. Halomassarina was later moved to Pleomassariaceae order.

== Taxonomy ==
Genera accepted by the GBIF include:

- Emarellia (2)
- Falciformispora K.D.Hyde, 1992 (9)
- Medicopsis Gruyter, Verkley & Crous (4)
- Trematosphaeria Fuckel, 1870 (103)

Figures in brackets are approx. how many species per genus.

== Effects ==
Species from Emarellia and Falciformispora are known to cause black-grain mycetoma in humans and mammals, the syndrome can lead to affected patients having limbs removed. Trematosphaeria grisea is a soil fungus that can cause leaf blotch diseases on plants including members of the Eucalyptus genera, in tropical and subtropical regions. It also produces mycetomas in cats as well as humans.
