= Betaenone A =

Names
- IUPAC name (3Z)-4,6,9-trihydroxy-3-(hydroxymethylidene)-1,6,8,9-tetramethyl-10-(1-methylpropyl)octahydro-1,4-ethanonaphthalen-2(1H)-one

Identifiers
CAS Number	85269-22-3
3D model (JSmol)	Interactive image
ChEBI	CHEBI:145055
ChemSpider	4585641
PubChem CID	5478031
UNII	XPB9YZV345
CompTox Dashboard (EPA)	DTXSID50420471
- InChI: InChI=1S/C21H34O5/c1-7-11(2)16-19(5)15-12(3)8-18(4,24)9-13(15)21(26,20(16,6)25)14(10-22)17(19)23/h10-13,15-16,22,24-26H,7-9H2,1-6H3/b14-10+ Key: FHJXKTOXQHRDTL-GXDHUFHOSA-N
- SMILES: OC12C(O)(C)C(C(C)CC)C(C)(C(=O)\C2=C\O)C3C1CC(O)(C)CC3C

Properties
Chemical formula	C_{21}H_{34}O_{5}
Molar mass	366.498 g·mol^{−1}
- Except where otherwise noted, data are given for materials in their standard state (at 25 °C [77 °F], 100 kPa). Infobox references

Betaenone A, like other betaenones (B and C), is a secondary metabolite isolated from the fungus Pleospora betae, a plant pathogen. Of the seven phytotoxins isolated in fungal leaf spots from sugar beet (Beta vulgaris), it showed 73% growth inhibition.
