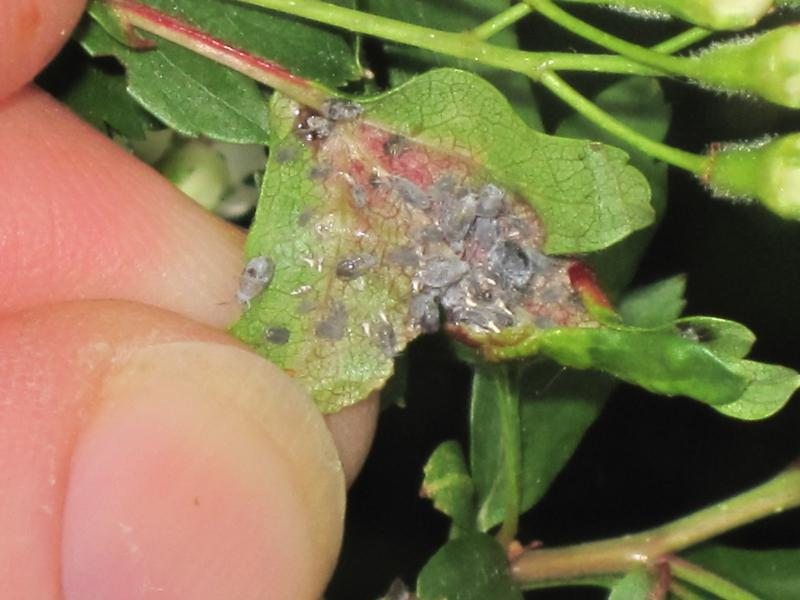

Scientific classification
- Domain: Eukaryota
- Kingdom: Animalia
- Phylum: Arthropoda
- Class: Insecta
- Order: Hemiptera
- Suborder: Sternorrhyncha
- Family: Aphididae
- Genus: Dysaphis
- Species: D. crataegi

Binomial name
- Dysaphis crataegi (Kaltenbach 1843)

= Dysaphis crataegi =

Species of true bug

Dysaphis crataegi, the hawthorn-carrot aphid, is an aphid in the superfamily Aphidoidea in the order Hemiptera. It is a true bug and sucks sap from plants.

== Taxonomy ==
The hawthorn-carrot aphid was first described by the German entomologist Johann Heinrich Kaltenbach in 1843. It has three subspecies in Europe. All overwinter on their primary host, hawthorn trees (Crataegus) spp., but each migrates to a different secondary host in the family Apiaceae during the summer; D. c. crataegi moves to wild carrot (Daucus carota), D. c. kunzei to wild parsnip (Pastinaca sativa) and D. c. aethusae to hedge parsley (Torilis spp.) or fool's parsley (Aethusa cynapium). Two further subspecies are found to Asia.

== Description ==
On the primary host, these aphids are about 2 mm (0.08 in) long, with short antennae and short siphunculi, greenish-grey and dusted with wax particles. On the secondary host, wingless viviparous females are greenish-grey or yellowish-grey, again dusted with fine wax particles. Winged viviparous females are greyish-red with black markings. Egg-laying females are reddish-brown and winged males are reddish with black markings.

== Ecology ==
The hawthorn-carrot aphid migrates to its primary host in late summer and forms red, curling galls on its leaves. The following spring, females move to its secondary host, an umbellifer in the family Apiaceae, and produce live offspring, When these nymphs are sufficiently mature, they produce further live young. Most offspring are wingless, but some winged females are produced which are able to colonize new secondary hosts. In late summer winged females and males are produced and migrate to hawthorn trees. These aphids are attended by ants on both their primary and secondary hosts.
