= Amniculicolaceae =

Scientific classification
- Kingdom: Fungi
- Division: Ascomycota
- Class: Dothideomycetes
- Order: Pleosporales
- Family: Amniculicolaceae; Y.Zhang ter, C.L.Schoch, J.Fournier, Crous & K.D.Hyde

Type genus
- Amniculicola Y.Zhang ter & K.D.Hyde

Family of fungi

Amniculicolaceae is a family of fungi belonging to the order Pleosporales. First described in 2009 by Y. Zhang ter, C.L. Schoch, J. Fournier, Crous & K.D. Hyde, the type genus is Amniculicola.

Genera:

- Amniculicola Ying Zhang & K.D.Hyde
- Anguillospora Ingold, 1942
- Murispora Y.Zhang bis, J.Fourn. & K.D.Hyde
- Neomassariosphaeria Zhang, Fourn. & Hyde, 2009
- Pseudomassariosphaeria Phukhamsakda et al.
