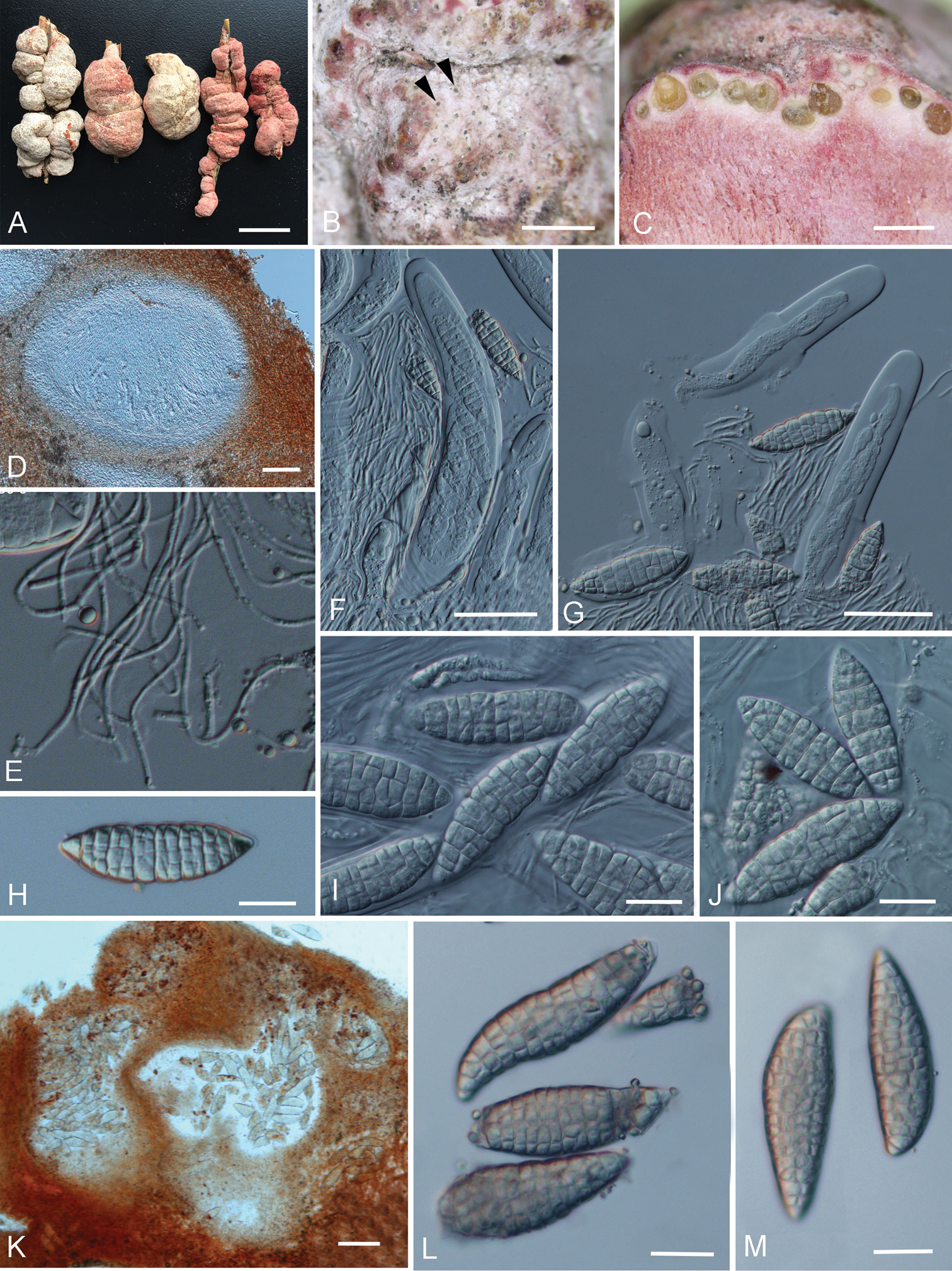

Scientific classification
- Kingdom: Fungi
- Division: Ascomycota
- Class: Dothideomycetes
- Order: Pleosporales
- Family: incertae sedis
- Genus: Shiraia; Henn. (1900)
- Species: S. bambusicola

Binomial name
- Shiraia bambusicola P. Henn. (1900)

= Shiraia bambusicola =

Species of fungus

Shiraia bambusicola is a parasitic fungus on twigs of several genera of bamboos, and its relatively large stromata are used in traditional Chinese medicine. It is the sole species in the monotypic genus Shiraia. It is widely distributed in many provinces of Southern China and also in Japan.

The genus Shiraia, named after Dr. Mitsutaro Shirai, was first established and proposed as a member of the family Nectriaceae by P. Hennings in 1900. Although the familial placement is somewhat uncertain, molecular phylogenetic evidence based on the sequences of ribosomal DNA supports its positioning in the Phaeosphaeriaceae. Species Fungorum uses the family name of Shiraiaceae.

The extracts from its stromata contain hypocrellins and shiraiachromes, members of perylenequinone class of natural products, which are photoactivated therapeutic agents. Hypocrellins were firstly found in another filamentous fungus Hypocrella bambuase, which is also parasitic on bamboos.
