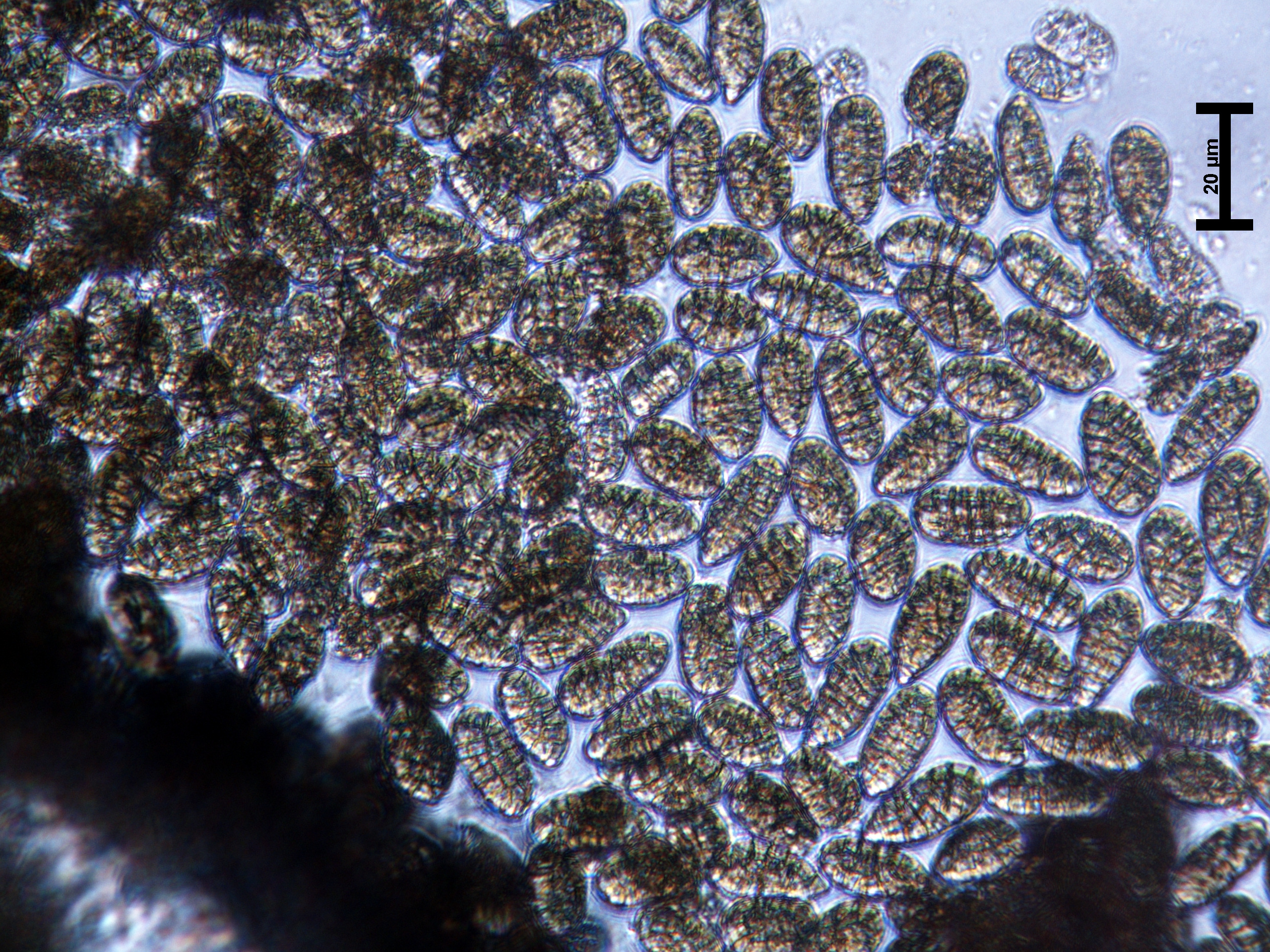
- Camarosporium spp. spores are ~20 µm long, apple-seed shaped, and often amber-colored

Scientific classification
- Domain: Eukaryota
- Kingdom: Fungi
- Division: Ascomycota
- Class: Dothideomycetes
- Order: Pleosporales
- Genus: Camarosporium; Schulzer, 1867

Type species
- Camarosporium quaternatum (Hazsl.) Schulzer 1867.

Synonyms
- Hyalothyris Clements, 1909; Piringa Spegazzini, 1910

= Camarosporium =

Genus of fungi

Camarosporium is a genus of fungi belonging to the order Pleosporales, and originally placed in family Coniothyriaceae. It was then placed in the family Camarosporiaceae Wanas., Wijayaw., K.D. Hyde & Crous, 2017 with another genus Camarosporomyces. This has been accepted by Wijayawardene et al. 2020.

The genus has cosmopolitan distribution.

Camarosporium quaternatum (Hazsl.) Schulzer has been found on twigs of Lycium barbarum (Solanaceae family) and also on twigs of Daphne mezereum (in Thymelaeaceae family). In Aleppo, Syria Camarosporium dalmaticum (Thüm.) Zachos & Tzav.-Klon._Thum_Gigante (syn Sphaeropsis dalmatica) causes olive drupe rot disease on Olive trees.

== Species ==
As of 2023 August 10, the GBIF lists up to 300 species, while Species Fungorum lists about 261 species.

A selected few species are shown here.

- Camarosporium abnorme (Peck) Sacc.
- Camarosporium acaciigenum S.Ahmad
- Camarosporium acanthophylli Kalymb.
