= Zopfiaceae =

Scientific classification
- Kingdom: Fungi
- Division: Ascomycota
- Class: Dothideomycetes
- Order: Pleosporales
- Family: Zopfiaceae; G.Arnaud ex D.Hawksw. (1992)

Genera
- Caryospora; Celtidia; Coronopapilla - tentative Didymocrea - tentative Halotthia - tentative Pontoporeia; Rechingeriella - tentative Richonia; Zopfia; Zopfiofoveola

Family of fungi

The Zopfiaceae are a family of fungi in the order Pleosporales. Taxa have a widespread distribution, and appear to be saprobic, found largely on rhizomes and roots. Some species are found in marine environments.
