= Crous =

Crous may refer to:

- Marie Crous (dates of birth and death unknown), a French mathematician
- Pedro Willem Crous (born 1963 in Crous), a botanist
- Piet Crous (born 1955), a South African professional boxer

== See also ==
- CROUS (Centre régional des œuvres universitaires et scolaires)
