= Growth inhibition =

Growth inhibition (GI) is a medical term pertaining to cancer therapy and the specific reduction in growth of tumors and oncogene cells by a chemical compound, mechanical therapy (e.g. electroporation), radiation, gene therapy, protein therapy, ultrasound waves, light, or any other treatment. Measured in micromoles/liter or micrograms/liter.

== See also ==
- Chemotherapy
- Radiotherapy
- Cancer
- Oncology
- Electroporation
- Protein therapy
