= Orto Botanico di Parma =

Italian free botanical garden by the University of Parma

Coordinates: 44°47′45.35″N 10°19′38.26″E

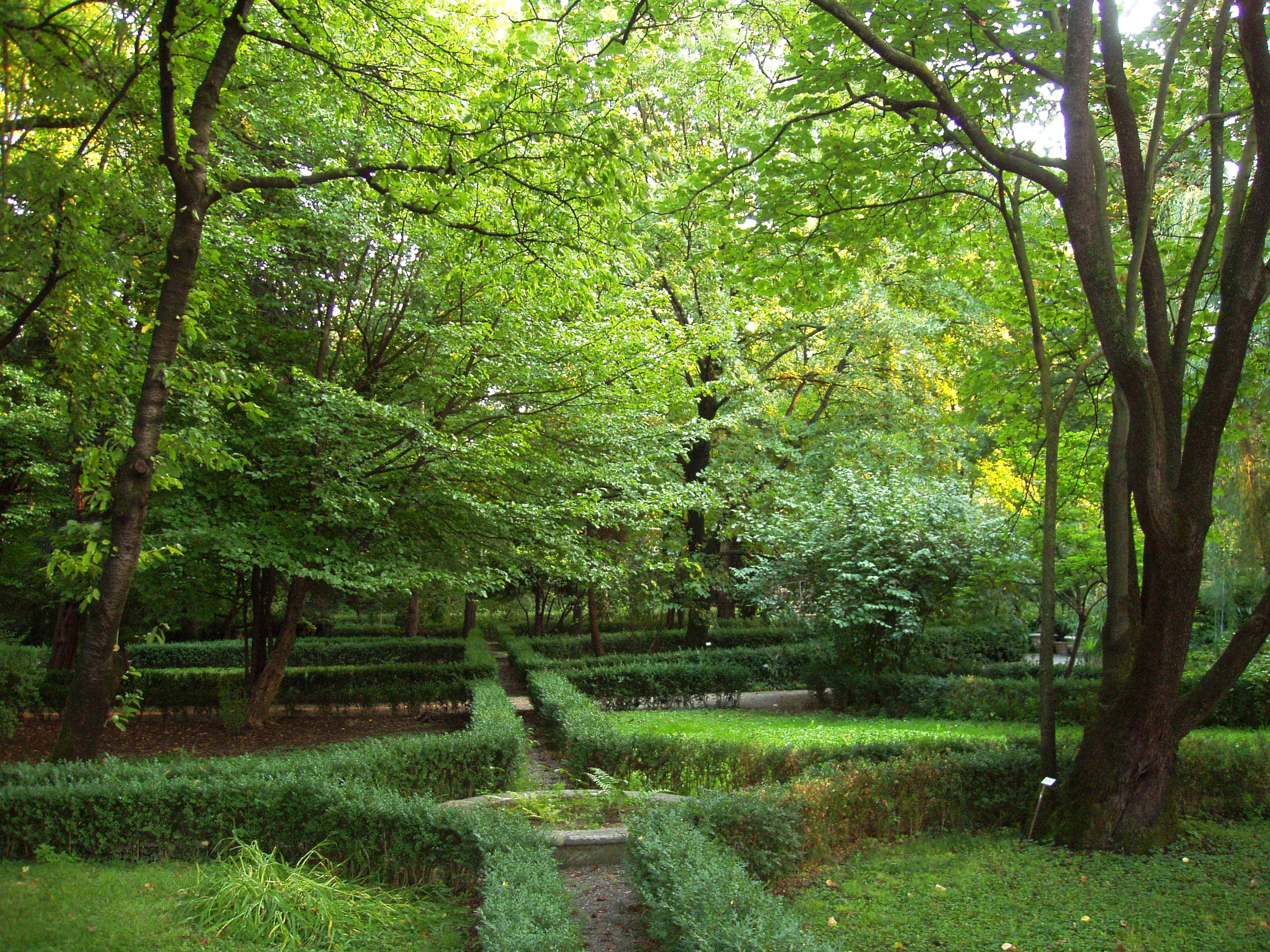
Orto Botanico di Parma.

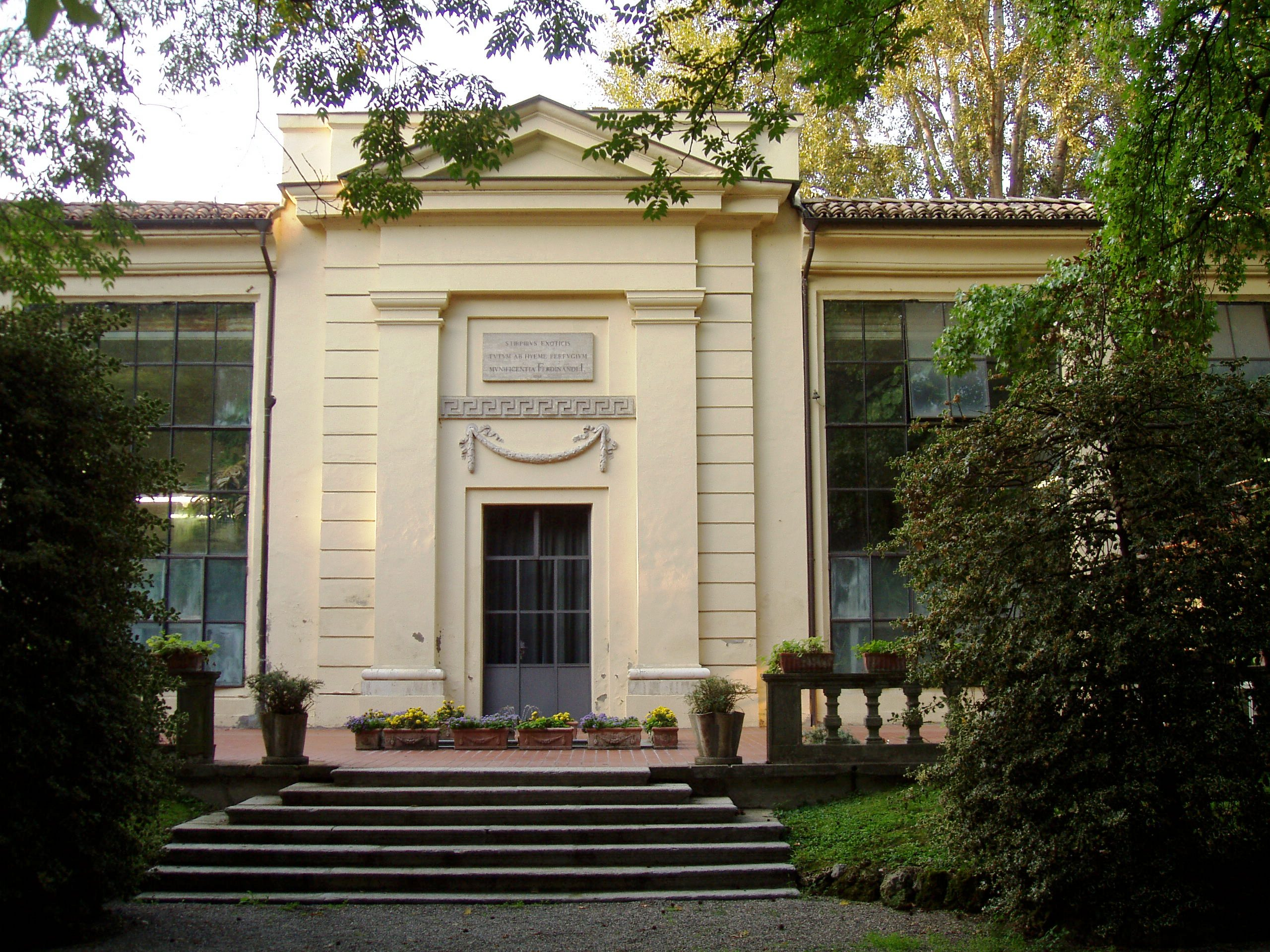
Glass houses.

The Orto Botanico di Parma, also known as the Orto Botanico dell'Università di Parma, is a botanical garden maintained by the University of Parma. It is located on the Viale Martiri della Libertà, Parma, Italy, and open daily without charge.

The garden succeeds Parma's earlier Orto dei Semplici, a garden for medicinal plants, established by Ranuccio I Farnese, Duke of Parma. Today's garden was created in 1770 by Giambattista Guatteri under the auspices of Ferdinand I of the Two Sicilies, with its glass house completed in 1793.

The garden contains aquatic plants including Acorus calamus, Butomus umbellatus, Caltha palustris, Cyperus papyrus, Eichhornia crassipes, Elodea canadensis, Iris pseudacorus, Lemna minor, Nymphaea alba, Pistia stratiotes, and Sagittaria sagittaefolia, as well as mature trees including ginkgo, magnolia, Pinus nigra subsp. laricio, and Ulmus campestris. Its glass houses contain a tropical section with Dracaena fragrans, Ficus elastica, F. benjamina, Monstera deliciosa, Tamarindus indica, Theobroma cacao, etc., as well as epiphytes, orchids, and tropical fruits; and a desert house containing a variety of cacti and succulents.
