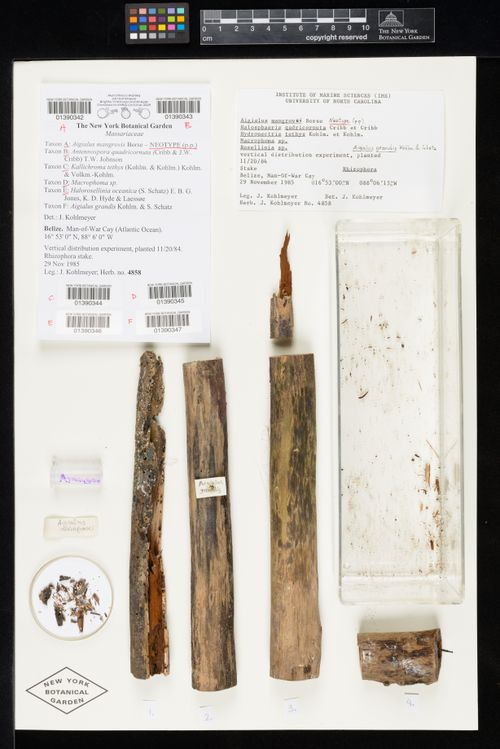
- Aigialus mangrovis

Scientific classification
- Kingdom: Fungi
- Division: Ascomycota
- Class: Dothideomycetes
- Order: Pleosporales
- Family: Aigialaceae; Suetrong, Sakay., E.B.G.Jones, Kohlm., Volkm.-Kohlm. & C.L.Schoch (2009)

Genera
- Aigialus; Ascocratera; Fissuroma; Neoastrosphaeriella; Posidoniomyces; Rimora

= Aigialaceae =

Family of fungi

Aigialaceae is a family of marine fungi belonging to the order Pleosporales. Suetrong and colleagues introduced this family in 2009.
