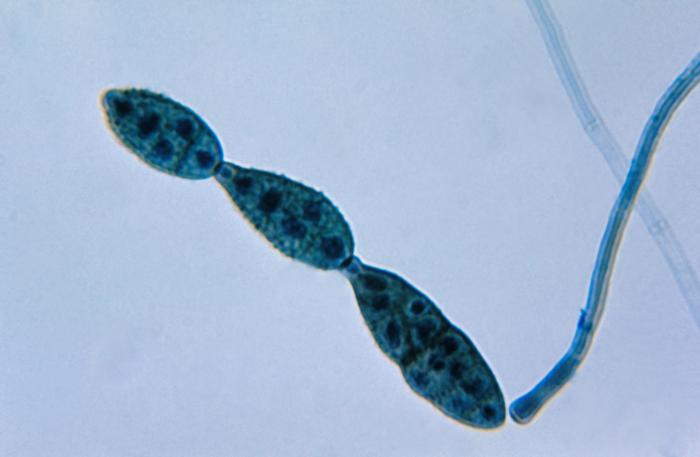
- Alternaria sp.

Scientific classification
- Kingdom: Fungi
- Division: Ascomycota
- Class: Dothideomycetes
- Subclass: Pleosporomycetidae
- Order: Pleosporales; Luttr. ex M.E.Barr (1987)

Families
- Aigialaceae; Amniculicolaceae; Camarosporiaceae; Coniothyriaceae; Cucurbitariaceae; Delitschiaceae; Diademaceae; Didymellaceae; Didymosphaeriaceae; Halojulellaceae; Lentitheciaceae; Leptosphaeriaceae; Lindgomycetaceae; Lophiostomataceae; Massariaceae; Massarinaceae; Melanommataceae; Neocamarosporiaceae; Phaeosphaeriaceae; Phaeotrichaceae; Pleomassariaceae; Pleosporaceae; Podonectriaceae; Pyrenidiaceae; Roussoellaceae; Salsugineaceae; Sporormiaceae; Teichosporaceae; Tetraplosphaeriaceae; Testudinaceae; Torulaceae; Trematosphaeriaceae; Tzeananaceae; Venturiaceae; Zopfiaceae

Synonyms
- Melanommatales; Pseudosphaeriales

= Pleosporales =

Pleosporales Temporal range: Eocene–recent

Order of fungi

The Pleosporales is the largest order in the fungal class Dothideomycetes. By a 2008 estimate, it contained 23 families, 332 genera and more than 4700 species. The majority of species are saprobes on decaying plant material in fresh water, marine, or terrestrial environments, but several species are also associated with living plants as parasites, epiphytes or endophytes. The best studied species cause plant diseases on important agricultural crops e.g. Cochliobolus heterostrophus, causing southern corn leaf blight on maize, Phaeosphaeria nodorum (Stagonospora nodorum) causing glume blotch on wheat and Leptosphaeria maculans causing a stem canker (called blackleg) on cabbage crops (Brassica). Some species of Pleosporales occur on animal dung, and a small number occur as lichens and rock-inhabiting fungi.

== Taxonomy ==
The order was proposed in 1955 as Dothideomycetes with perithecioid ascomata with pseudoparaphyses amongst the asci, at which time there were seven families (Botryosphaeriaceae, Didymosphaeriaceae, Herpotrichiellaceae, Lophiostomataceae, Mesnieraceae, Pleosporaceae, and Venturiaceae). Three further families were added in 1973 (Dimeriaceae, Mycoporaceae, and Sporormiaceae). Coniothyriaceae was added by W.B. Cooke in 1983. The order was only formally described in 1987 (Barr) with 21 families. Five families were added in 2009 (Aigialaceae, Amniculicolaceae, Lentitheciaceae, Tetraplosphaeriaceae, and Trematosphaeriaceae). The family Halojulellaceae was circumscribed in 2013, as well as Salsugineaceae. Roussoellaceae was introduced by Liu et al. (2014), family Torulaceae was added in 2017, as well as family Camarosporiaceae, and Neocamarosporiaceae. Then the family Tzeananaceae was added in 2018.

=== Subdivision ===
Margaret E. Barr in 1979, originally accepted six suborders within which to arrange the families. A suborder, Pleosporineae has been proposed, including four families (Didymellaceae, Leptosphaeriaceae, Phaeosphaeriaceae and Pleosporaceae). Families Ascocylindricaceae, Coniothyriaceae, Cucurbitariaceae, Dothidotthiaceae, Halojulellaceae, Neopyrenochaetaceae, Neophaeosphaeriaceae, Parapyrenochaetaceae, Pseudopyrenochaetaceae, Pyrenochaetopsidaceae, Shiraiaceae and Tzeananiaceae joined them later in 2015.

Also suborder Massarineae with five families (Lentitheciaceae, Massarinaceae, Montagnulaceae, Morosphaeriaceae and Trematosphaeriaceae). In 2015, with DNA analysis, the monophyletic status of the Dictyosporiaceae, Didymosphaeriaceae, Latoruaceae, Macrodiplodiopsidaceae, Massarinaceae, Morosphaeriaceae, and Trematosphaeriaceae was strongly supported, while the clades of the Bambusicolaceae and the Lentitheciaceae are only moderately supported. Two new families, Parabambusicolaceae and Sulcatisporaceae, were proposed in 2015.

=== Phylogenetics ===
The Pleosporales form a well supported clade, with 17 subclades. As a result of phylogenetic studies, the Pleosporales have undergone considerable reorganisation, particularly with reference to the very large genus Phoma and the family Didymellaceae. Consequently, a number of genera considered incertae sedis have now been placed within the latter family.

=== Genera incertae sedis ===
These are genera of the Pleosporales of uncertain taxonomy that have not been placed in any family.

- Amarenomyces
- Anguillospora
- Aquaticheirospora
- Ascochyta
- Ascochytella
- Ascochytula
- Ascorhombispora
- Ascoronospora
- Berkleasmium
- Briansuttonia
- Centrospora
- Cheiromoniliophora
- Cheirosporium
- Clavariopsis
- Coronospora
- Dactuliophora
- Dictyosporium
- Didymocrea
- Digitodesmium
- Elegantimyces
- Extrusothecium
- Farlowiella
- Fusculina
- Helicascus
- Herpotrichia
- Hyalobelemnospora
- Immotthia
- Letendraea
- Margaretbarromyces
- Massariosphaeria
- Metameris
- Monoblastiopsis
- Mycocentrospora
- Mycodidymella
- Neopeckia
- Neophaeosphaeria
- Ocala
- Ochrocladosporium
- Paraliomyces
- Passerinula
- Periconia
- Phaeostagonospora
- Protocucurbitaria
- Pseudochaetosphaeronema
- Pseudodidymella
- Pseudotrichia
- Pyrenochaeta
- Rhopographus
- Setomelanomma
- Shiraia
- Speira
- Sporidesmium
- Sporocybe
- Subbaromyces
- Trematosphaeriopsis
- Versicolorisporium
- Wettsteinina
- Wicklowia

Although in 2009 when Lentitheciaceae was established it placed various genera such as Lentithecium and Tingoldiago, plus others.

=== Evolution ===
The oldest members of Pleosporales are the fossil genera Margaretbarromyces, which was described from Eocene age strata on Vancouver Island, British Columbia, and Cryptodidymosphaerites, described from the Ypresian Princeton chert in the British Columbian interior.

== Bibliography ==
- Zhang Y, Crous PW, Schoch CL, Hyde KD (2011). "Pleosporales". Fungal Diversity. 53 (1): 1–221. doi:10.1007/s13225-011-0117-x. PMC 3477819. PMID 23097638.
- Schoch CL, Crous PW, Groenewald JZ, Boehm EW, et al. (2009). "A class-wide phylogenetic assessment of Dothideomycetes" (PDF). Studies in Mycology. 64: 1–15. doi:10.3114/sim.2009.64.01. PMC 2816964. PMID 20169021.
