= Requienellaceae =

Scientific classification
- Kingdom: Fungi
- Division: Ascomycota
- Class: Sordariomycetes
- Order: Xylariales
- Family: Requienellaceae; Boise (1986)

Type genus
- Requienella Fabre (1883)

Genera
- Acrocordiella; Lacrymospora; Parapyrenis; Requienella

Family of fungi

The Requienellaceae are a family of ascomycete fungi in the order Xylariales. Members of the family occur on bark, wood, and sometimes lichens. The family was originally proposed for fungi thought to be allied with the Pyrenulales, but molecular phylogenetic studies later showed that its type genus, Requienella, belongs in Xylariales.

== Taxonomy ==
Requienellaceae was circumscribed by Jean Boise in 1986 for a group of fungi studied during research on Trematosphaeria, and she established the family with Requienella as its type genus. The type genus itself had originally been erected by Jean-Henri Fabre in 1883. In Boise's treatment, the family was placed in the Melanommatales sensu Barr or the Pyrenulales sensu Eriksson and Hawksworth, reflecting the uncertain position then assigned to these fungi on morphological grounds.

Boise also reinstated Requienella, noted that the name had often been misspelt "Requinella" in earlier mycological literature, and selected R. seminuda as the lectotype species of the genus. In doing so, she treated R. olearum as a synonym of R. seminuda and pointed out that the fungus widely identified under the name Sphaeria seminuda in some older literature was actually a species of Melanomma. Boise further regarded Trematomyces and Acrocordiella as synonyms of Requienella.

A molecular study published in 2016, however, showed that Requienella belongs in the order Xylariales, not among the dothideomycetes where it had often been placed, and also found that Acrocordiella is not congeneric with Requienella. Subsequent authors retained Requienellaceae in Xylariales and generally accepted Requienella and Acrocordiella in the family, although broader circumscriptions that also included Lacrymospora and Parapyrenis were proposed in some treatments and remain unsettled.

== Description ==
Requienellaceae fungi are characterized by several distinctive features of their reproductive structures. They produce dark, spherical fruiting bodies (ascomata) that are typically 0.5–1.25 mm in diameter. These structures are initially embedded within or beneath the bark of their host plants, with the surrounding tissue becoming blackened. Over time, they emerge through the bark's surface.

A key characteristic of this family is their unique internal structure. They possess unbranched, sparsely septate pseudoparaphyses (sterile threads between the spore-producing cells) and specialized spore-producing cells called asci. The asci have a distinctive broad cylinder of material at their tips that responds distinctively to certain biological stains. This feature helps distinguish them from related fungi.

The spores (ascospores) produced by these fungi are brown in color and have multiple compartments separated by special cross-walls called distosepta. These spores show bilateral symmetry, meaning they are mirror images along their middle. In Requienella seminuda, the type species of the family, the spores typically contain 4–8 compartments and measure 20–34 μm in length.

Members of Requienella are typically found growing on the bark of various trees, including olive trees (Olea), ash trees (Fraxinus), and cherry trees (Prunus). They are not known to form lichens with algae, existing independently as fungi.

== Genera ==
The 2024 Outline of Fungi include 16 species distributed amongst 4 genera in the Requienellaceae:

- Acrocordiella O.E.Erikss. (1982) – 4 spp.
- Lacrymospora Aptroot (1991) – 1 spp.
- Parapyrenis Aptroot (1991) – 8 spp.
- Requienella Fabre (1883) – 3 spp.
