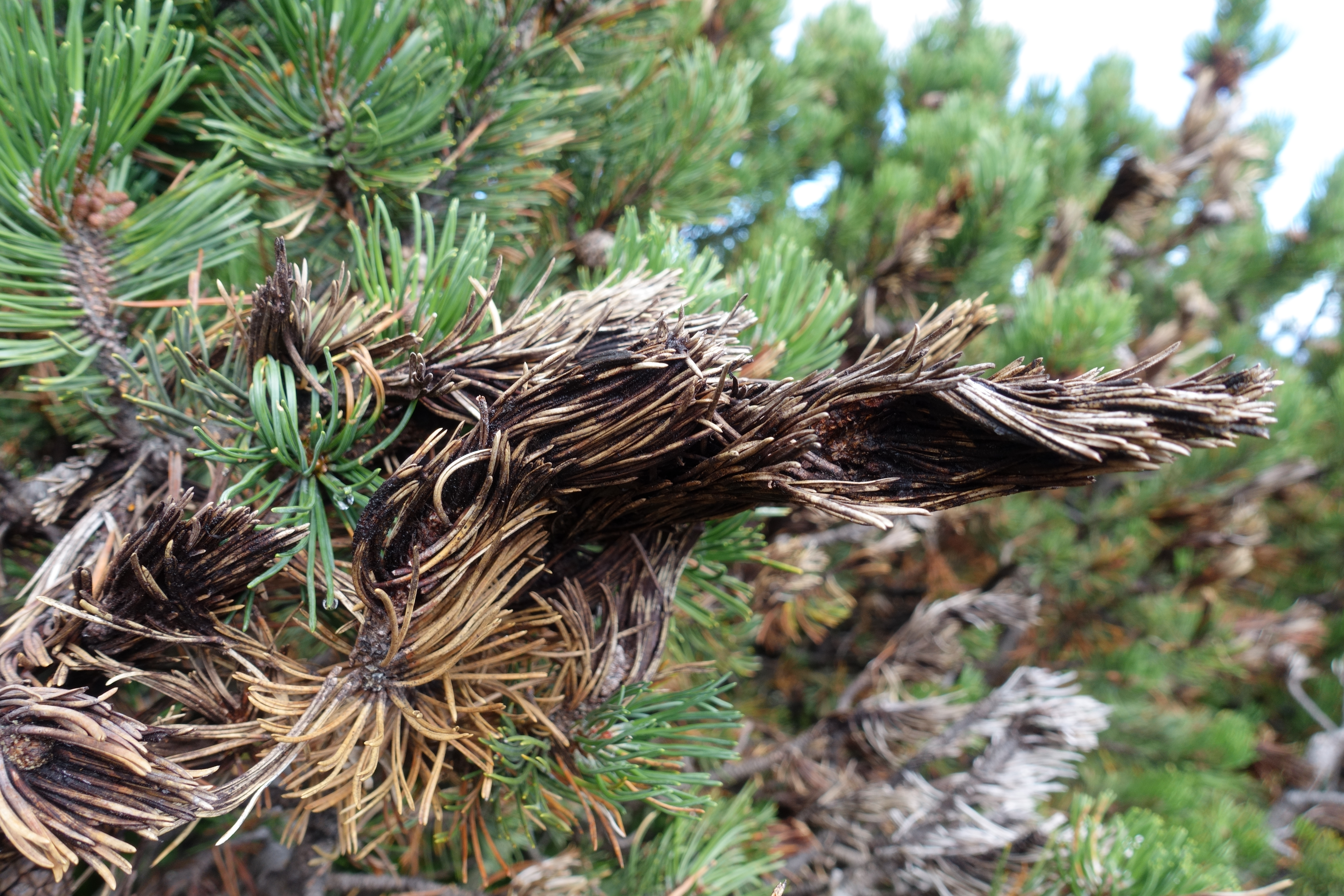
- Herpotrichia pinetorum (syn. H. juniperi) on Pinus mugo

Scientific classification
- Kingdom: Fungi
- Division: Ascomycota
- Class: Dothideomycetes
- Order: Pleosporales
- Family: Melanommataceae
- Genus: Herpotrichia; Fuckel

Type species
- Herpotrichia rubi Fuckel

= Herpotrichia =

Genus of fungi

Herpotrichia is a genus of fungi in the family Melanommataceae.

== Species ==
Species accepted by Species Fungorum;

- Herpotrichia alligata (Fr.) M.E. Barr (1992)
- Herpotrichia alpincola Rehm (1906)
- Herpotrichia arizonica M.E. Barr (1992)
- Herpotrichia australis S.K. Bose (1961)
- Herpotrichia bakeri Syd. & P. Syd. (1917)
- Herpotrichia bambusana Henn. (1908)
- Herpotrichia boldoae Speg. (1910)
- Herpotrichia brasiliensis Rick (1933)
- Herpotrichia brenckleana Petr. (1923)
- Herpotrichia caesalpiniae (Doidge) Sivan. (1972)
- Herpotrichia calamicola J. Fröhl. & K.D. Hyde (2000)
- Herpotrichia callimorpha (Auersw.) G. Winter (1885)
- Herpotrichia caulogena Feltgen (1903)
- Herpotrichia chilensis Speg. (1910)
- Herpotrichia cirrhostoma (Berk. & Broome) Petch (1912)
- Herpotrichia dalisayi K.D. Hyde & Aptroot (1998)
- Herpotrichia decidua (Ellis & Everh.) M.E. Barr (1992)
- Herpotrichia detzneriae Otani (1971)
- Herpotrichia diffusa (Cooke) Ellis & Everh. (1892)
- Herpotrichia ellisii (Sacc. & P. Syd.) M.E. Barr (1992)
- Herpotrichia ephedrae Kuhnh.-Lord. & J.P. Barry (1949)
- Herpotrichia fusispora Chi Y. Chen & W.H. Hsieh (2004)
- Herpotrichia gelasinosporoides (J.N. Kapoor, S.P. Lal & Bahl) Arx (1981)
- Herpotrichia henkeliana Syd. & P. Syd. (1921)
- Herpotrichia herbarum (Wehm.) M.E. Barr (1992)
- Herpotrichia herpotrichoides (Fuckel) P.F. Cannon (1982)
- Herpotrichia hippocrateae Tilak (1975)
- Herpotrichia indica Anahosur (1971)
- Herpotrichia laricina Feltgen (1901)
- Herpotrichia leptospora Kirschst. (1911)
- Herpotrichia lignicola (Mouton) S.K. Bose (1961)
- Herpotrichia macrotricha (Berk. & Broome) Sacc. (1883)
- Herpotrichia mangrovei E.B.G. Jones & Vrijmoed (2003)
- Herpotrichia melanotricha Saccas (1954)
- Herpotrichia millettiae Sivan. (1972)
- Herpotrichia monospermatis P.G. Sathe & K.M. Mogarkar (1973)
- Herpotrichia moravica Petr. (1914)
- Herpotrichia mulleri Tilak & S.B. Kale (1969)
- Herpotrichia myriangii Racib. (1909)
- Herpotrichia nectrioides Rehm (1901)
- Herpotrichia nigra R. Hartig (1888)
- Herpotrichia nigrotuberculata (I. Hino & Katum.) Piroz. (1972)
- Herpotrichia nypicola K.D. Hyde & Alias (1999)
- Herpotrichia occulta Rick (1933)
- Herpotrichia ochrostoma Feltgen (1903)
- Herpotrichia palmicola J. Fröhl. & K.D. Hyde (2000)
- Herpotrichia pandei S.K. Bose (1961)
- Herpotrichia petrakiana S.K. Bose (1960)
- Herpotrichia philippinensis Rehm (1914)
- Herpotrichia pinetorum (Fuckel) G. Winter (1885)
- Herpotrichia quinqueseptata Weir (1915)
- Herpotrichia rara Kirschst. (1935)
- Herpotrichia rhenana Fuckel (1870)
- Herpotrichia rhodospiloides Peck (1909)
- Herpotrichia rhodosticta (Berk. & Broome) Sacc. (1883)
- Herpotrichia setosa M.E. Barr (1992)
- Herpotrichia striatispora Papendorf & Arx (1967)
- Herpotrichia symphoricarpi (Tracy & Earle) M.E. Barr (1968)
- Herpotrichia tenuispora Kirschst. (1906)
- Herpotrichia vaginatispora Q. Tian, Wanas., Camporesi & K.D. Hyde (2015)
- Herpotrichia villosa Samuels & E. Müll. (1979)
- Herpotrichia xiaokongensis G.C. Ren & K.D. Hyde (2021)

Former species (most are Melanommataceae, excepted stated ones);

- H. barbicincta (Ellis & Everh.) Ellis & Everh. (1892) = Chaetosphaeria barbicincta, Chaetosphaeriaceae
- H. callimorpha var. juniperi Feltgen (1901) = Herpotrichia callimorpha
- H. collapsa (Romell) Rehm (1903) = Nitschkia collapsa, Nitschkiaceae
- H. coulteri (Peck) S.K. Bose (1961) = Neopeckia coulteri, Dothideomycetes
- H. diffusa var. rhodomphala (Berk.) Ellis (1895) = Byssosphaeria rhodomphala
- H. erythrinae B. Huguenin (1966) = Byssosphaeria erythrinae
- H. heterostoma (P. Karst.) Sacc. (1883) = Echinosphaeria heterostoma, Helminthosphaeriaceae
- H. jamaicana Sivan. (1971) = Byssosphaeria jamaicana
- H. juniperi (Sacc.) Petr. (1925) = Herpotrichia pinetorum
- H. keithii (Berk. & Broome) Sacc. (1883) = Byssosphaeria schiedermayriana
- H. melasperma (Cooke) Sivan. (1972) = Lojkania melasperma, Fenestellaceae
- H. mutabilis (Pers.) G. Winter (1885) = Pseudotrichia mutabilis
- H. nicaraguensis Ellis & Everh. (1893) = Jobellisia nicaraguensis, Jobellisiaceae
- H. parasitica (R. Hartig) Rostr. (1890) = Nematostoma parasiticum, Pseudoperisporiaceae
- H. pezizula (Berk. & M.A. Curtis) Pat. (1903) = Thaxteriella pezizula, Tubeufiaceae
- H. resinae Bres. ex Capp. (1928) = Sorocybe resinae, Amorphothecaceae
- H. rhodomphala (Berk.) Sacc. (1883) = Byssosphaeria rhodomphala
- H. rhodospila (Berk. & M.A. Curtis) Sacc. (1883) = Bertiella rhodospila, Massarinaceae
- H. rubi Fuckel (1868) = Herpotrichia herpotrichoides
- H. schiedermayriana Fuckel (1874) = Byssosphaeria schiedermayriana
- H. schiedermayriana var. caldariorum Henn. (1895) = Byssosphaeria schiedermayriana
- H. schiedermayriana var. xestothele (Berk. & M.A. Curtis) Sivan. (1972) = Byssosphaeria xestothele
- H. separans (Ellis & Everh.) Sivan. (1972) = Lojkania separans, Fenestellaceae
- H. vermicularispora (I. Hino & Katum.) Piroz. (1972) = Chaetosphaerulina vermicularispora, Tubeufiaceae
- H. xestotheli (Berk. & M.A. Curtis) Sacc. (1928) = Byssosphaeria xestothele
- H. yasudae (I. Hino) Piroz. (1972) = Chaetosphaerulina yasudae, Tubeufiaceae
