= Requien =

Requien may refer to:

- Musée Requien, a natural history museum in Avignon, France
- Esprit Requien (1788–1851), a French naturalist, who made contributions in the fields of conchology
