= Requienella =

Scientific classification
- Kingdom: Fungi
- Division: Ascomycota
- Class: Sordariomycetes
- Order: Xylariales
- Family: Requienellaceae
- Genus: Requienella; Fabre (1883)

Type species
- Requienella seminuda (Pers.) Boise (1986)

Species
- R. fraxini R. lichenopsis R. populi R. seminuda R. shangrilana

Genus of fungi

Requienella is a small genus of bark-dwelling ascomycete fungi in the family Requienellaceae. It was erected by Jean-Henri Fabre in 1883 for species with black, partly exposed fruiting bodies and large, dark, many-septate spores. The genus was long difficult to classify, and was discussed in both mycological and lichenological literature, but modern DNA studies place it in the order Xylariales. Most modern authors treat Requienella as non-lichenised, and its species are best known from the bark of old living trees.

== Taxonomy ==
Jean-Henri Fabre introduced Requienella in Annales des Sciences Naturelles and dedicated the name to the botanist Esprit Requien of Avignon. His original concept included four species. Later revision showed that only one of them belonged in the modern sense of the genus, and Jean Boise reinstated Requienella in 1986 with R. seminuda as its type species.

Because the genus has fissitunicate-looking asci (spore-producing cells with a double-walled opening mechanism) and brown, distoseptate spores (spores with internal dividing walls), it was historically moved between several different groups of ascomycetes, including the Dothideomycetes and the Pyrenulales. It was also discussed in lichenological work on pyrenocarpous (flask-fruited) fungi, reflecting how uncertain the boundary between lichenised and non-lichenised taxa once seemed in this part of the fungal tree.

A molecular study by Jaklitsch, Gardiennet and Voglmayr in 2016 showed that Requienella and the related genus Acrocordiella belong in Requienellaceae within the Xylariales, not with the dothideomycetes where the genus had often been placed. Subsequent work on related members of Requienellaceae showed that the broader limits of the family were still being refined in the early 2020s, although Requienella remained its type genus throughout.

Recent authors have mainly discussed four species supported by DNA data: R. seminuda on olive, R. fraxini on ash, R. shangrilana from China, and R. populi on aspen in Norway. Earlier literature also retained R. lichenopsis from Prunus, but it has not been included in recent molecular treatments. A further species, R. shangrilana, was described from Shangri-La in Yunnan, China, where it was collected as a saprobe on dead twigs of an unidentified host.

== Description ==
Requienella species form small to medium-sized black fruiting bodies embedded in bark. In the best-known European species these structures begin beneath the bark and later erupt through it as shiny black papillae or short cones, often with a whitish ring or patch around them that makes them conspicuous in the field.

Inside the fruiting body are elongated spore-bearing sacs, or asci, usually containing eight ascospores. The spores are initially colourless, then become yellow-brown to brown at maturity. They are divided by several internal partitions and have large lens-shaped chambers, giving them a segmented appearance under the microscope.

Species are separated mainly by details of spore size and septation (the number of internal dividing walls), together with host association. R. fraxini usually has mainly 3-septate spores (spores with three cross-walls), R. seminuda typically has five septa, and R. populi often develops additional longitudinal septa, making the spores partly muriform (divided in a brick-like pattern). R. shangrilana differs in being more deeply immersed and in having unitunicate asci (spore-producing cells with a single-walled opening mechanism) in its original description, showing that the genus remains morphologically unusual and is still not fully understood.

== Habitat and distribution ==
Species of Requienella grow on bark, especially on old living trees with rough, well-developed bark. The European species show marked host preferences: R. fraxini is associated with Fraxinus excelsior, R. seminuda with Olea europaea, and R. populi with Populus tremula.

At least the European species do not usually seem to cause obvious damage to the host, and their nutritional mode remains uncertain. Recent authors have suggested that some may belong to a poorly understood community of bark-inhabiting fungi that live as commensals or endophytic associates rather than as aggressive pathogens.

Geographically, R. seminuda is known from southern and western Europe, especially the Mediterranean region; R. fraxini is known from humid parts of Europe and was first reported from Norway and Sweden under the name R. seminuda before being separated as a distinct species; R. populi is so far known only from the oceanic part of western Norway. The Chinese species R. shangrilana is known from Shangri-La in Yunnan, where it was collected at 3,390 m elevation on dead twigs of an unidentified host. Because records have often come from targeted surveys of old trees, the genus is probably under-recorded.

== Species ==
- Requienella fraxini Jaklitsch & Voglmayr (2016)
- Requienella lichenopsis (A Massal.) Boise (1986)
- Requienella populi Andreasen & Nordén (2025)
- Requienella seminuda (Pers.) Boise (1986)
- Requienella shangrilana L.S.Dissan., K.D.Hyde & J.C.Kang (2024)

Former species:

- Requienella alaterni Fabre (1883), now Navicella pileata
- Requienella olearum (Castagne) Fabre (1883), now a synonym of Requienella seminuda
- Requienella princeps Fabre (1883), now Decaisnella princeps
- Requienella saccardiana Fabre (1883), now Navicella pileata
