= Tubeufia =

Scientific classification
- Domain: Eukaryota
- Kingdom: Fungi
- Division: Ascomycota
- Class: Dothideomycetes
- Order: Tubeufiales
- Family: Tubeufiaceae
- Genus: Tubeufia; Penz. & Saccardo

Type species
- Tubeufia javanica Penz. & Saccardo

Genus of fungi

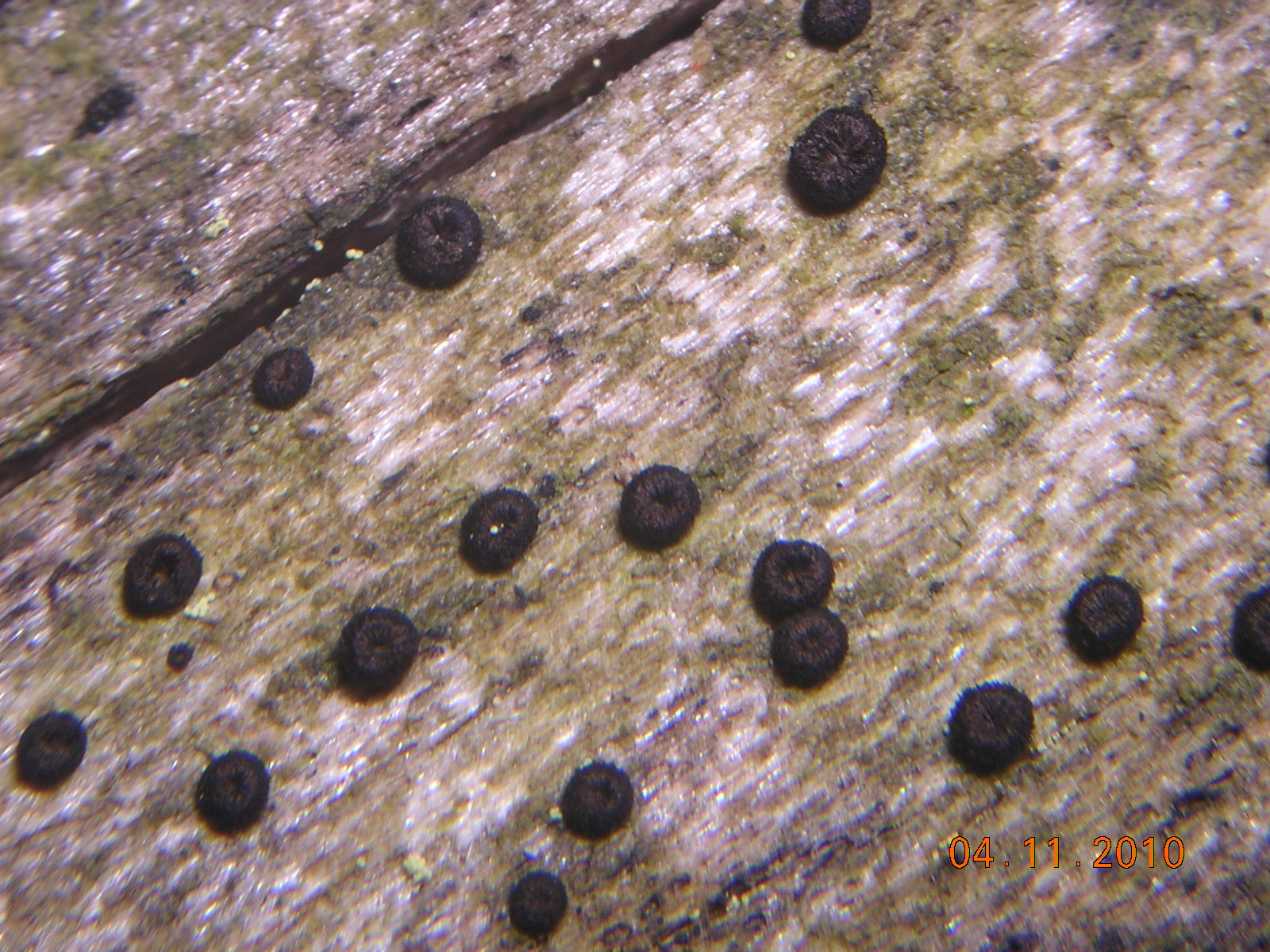
Tibeufia roraimensis

Tubeufia is a genus in the Tubeufiaceae family of fungi.

The genus was circumscribed by Albert Julius Otto Penzig and Pier Andrea Saccardo in Malpighia vol.11 on page 517 in 1898.

The genus name of Tubeufia is in honour of Carl or Karl von Tubeuf, FLS HFRSE (1862–1941), who was a German forestry scientist, mycologist and plant pathologist.

== Species ==
As accepted by Species Fungorum;

- Tubeufia abundata Y.Z. Lu, J.C. Kang & K.D. Hyde (2018)
- Tubeufia acaciae Tilak, S.B. Kale & S.V.S. Kale (1970)
- Tubeufia aciculospora Katum. & Y. Harada (1979)
- Tubeufia aquatica Z.L. Luo, Bhat & K.D. Hyde (2017)
- Tubeufia asclepiadis Bat. & R.G. de Souza (1961)
- Tubeufia asiana Sivichai & C.K.M. Tsui (2008)
- Tubeufia bambusicola Y.Z. Lu, J.C. Kang & K.D. Hyde (2018)
- Tubeufia brevis Y.Z. Lu, J.C. Kang & K.D. Hyde (2018)
- Tubeufia brevispina (M.E. Barr & Rogerson) J.L. Crane, Shearer & M.E. Barr (1998)
- Tubeufia brunnea Y.Z. Lu, J.C. Kang & K.D. Hyde (2018)
- Tubeufia cerea (Berk. & M.A. Curtis) Höhn. (1919)
- Tubeufia chiangmaiensis Boonmee & K.D. Hyde (2014)
- Tubeufia chlamydospora Y.Z. Lu, Boonmee & K.D. Hyde (2018)
- Tubeufia claspisphaeria Kodsueb (2004)
- Tubeufia cylindrothecia (Seaver) Höhn. (1919)
- Tubeufia dactylariae H.S. Chang (2003)
- Tubeufia dentophora (G.Z. Zhao, Xing Z. Liu & W.P. Wu) Y.Z. Lu & K.D. Hyde (2018)
- Tubeufia dictyospora Y.Z. Lu, Boonmee & K.D. Hyde (2018)
- Tubeufia eccentrica Y.Z. Lu, J.C. Kang & K.D. Hyde (2018)
- Tubeufia entadae Jayasiri, E.B.G. Jones & K.D. Hyde (2019)
- Tubeufia eugeniae (Subhedar & V.G. Rao) A. Pande (2008)
- Tubeufia fangchengensis Y.Z. Lu, J.C. Kang & K.D. Hyde (2018)
- Tubeufia filiformis Y.Z. Lu, Boonmee & K.D. Hyde (2017)
- Tubeufia freycinetiae Tibpromma & K.D. Hyde (2018)
- Tubeufia garugae (C. Ramesh) A. Pande (2008)
- Tubeufia guangxiensis Chaiwan, Boonmee, Y.Z. Lu & K.D. Hyde (2017)
- Tubeufia hechiensis Y.Z. Lu, J.C. Kang & K.D. Hyde (2018)
- Tubeufia helicoma (W. Phillips & Plowr.) Piroz. (1972)
- Tubeufia helicomyces Höhn. (1909)
- Tubeufia hyalospora Y.Z. Lu, Boonmee & K.D. Hyde (2016)
- Tubeufia inaequalis Y.Z. Lu, J.C. Kang & K.D. Hyde (2018)
- Tubeufia javanica Penz. & Sacc. (1898)
- Tubeufia krabiensis Y.Z. Lu, Boonmee & K.D. Hyde (2018)
- Tubeufia latispora Y.Z. Lu, Boonmee & K.D. Hyde (2017)
- Tubeufia laxispora Y.Z. Lu, Boonmee & K.D. Hyde (2017)
- Tubeufia lilliputea (R.T. Moore) Y.Z. Lu & K.D. Hyde (2018)
- Tubeufia longihelicospora Boonmee, Promputtha & K.D. Hyde (2021)
- Tubeufia longiseta D.Q. Dai & K.D. Hyde (2016)
- Tubeufia machaerinae (Goos) Y.Z. Lu & K.D. Hyde (2018)
- Tubeufia mackenziei Y.Z. Lu, Boonmee & K.D. Hyde (2017)
- Tubeufia minuta Munk (1966)
- Tubeufia pachythrix (Rehm) Rossman (1979)
- Tubeufia palmarum (Torrend) Samuels, Rossman & E. Müll. (1979)
- Tubeufia pandanicola Tibpromma & K.D. Hyde (2018)
- Tubeufia parvispora Tibpromma & K.D. Hyde (2018)
- Tubeufia parvula Dennis (1975)
- Tubeufia roseohelicospora Y.Z. Lu, Boonmee & K.D. Hyde (2016)
- Tubeufia rubra Y.Z. Lu, J.C. Kang & K.D. Hyde (2018)
- Tubeufia sahyadriensis Rajeshkumar, K.D. Hyde & Wijayaw. (2019)
- Tubeufia sessilis Y.Z. Lu, J.C. Kang & K.D. Hyde (2018)
- Tubeufia silentvalleyensis (V.G. Rao & Varghese) A. Pande (2008)
- Tubeufia sympodihylospora Y.Z. Lu, J.C. Kang & K.D. Hyde (2018)
- Tubeufia sympodilaxispora Y.Z. Lu, J.C. Kang & K.D. Hyde (2018)
- Tubeufia sympodiophora (Matsush.) Y.Z. Lu & K.D. Hyde (2018)
- Tubeufia tectonae Doilom & K.D. Hyde (2016)
- Tubeufia tratensis Y.Z. Lu, J.C. Kang & K.D. Hyde (2018)
- Tubeufia xylophila (P.N. Singh & S.K. Singh) Y.Z. Lu & K.D. Hyde (2018)

Former species; (Assume Tubeufiaceae family if not mentioned)

- T. albo-ostiolata Rossman (1987) = Thaxteriella albo-ostiolata
- T. alpina L. Holm & Nograsek (1990) = Acanthostigmina longispora
- T. amazonensis Samuels, Rossman & E. Müll. (1979) = Thaxteriella amazonensis
- T. anceps Penz. & Sacc. (1898) = Parahelicomyces paludosus
- T. aurantiella (Penz. & Sacc.) Rossman (1979) = Neohelicosporium aurantiellum
- T. clintonii (Peck) M.E. Barr (1980) = Acanthostigma perpusillum
- T. coccicola (Ellis & Everh.) Lar.N. Vassiljeva (1998) = Podonectria coccicola, Podonectriaceae
- T. coronata Penz. & Sacc. (1898) = Parahelicomyces paludosus
- T. corynespora Munk (1966) = Thaxteriella corynespora
- T. eriodermatis Etayo (2002) = Lichenotubeufia eriodermatis
- T. genuflexa (Höhn.) Arx & E. Müll. (1975) = Acanthostigmella genuflexa
- T. hebridensis Dennis (1991) = Taphrophila hebridensis
- T. heterodermiae Etayo (2002) = Lichenotubeufia heterodermiae
- T. indica (Dharne & E. Müll.) Deoray & Ujjainkar (1994) = Thaxteriella indica
- T. khunkornensis Boonmee & K.D. Hyde (2011) = Helicoma khunkornense
- T. miscanthi W.H. Hsieh, Chi Y. Chen & Sivan. (1998) = Helicoma miscanthi
- T. nigrotuberculata I. Hino & Katum. (1956) = Herpotrichia nigrotuberculata, Melanommataceae
- T. ovata Rossman (1987) = Thaxteriella ovata
- T. paludosa (P. Crouan & H. Crouan) Rossman (1977) = Parahelicomyces paludosus
- T. pannariae Etayo (2002) = Lichenotubeufia pannariae
- T. pezizula (Berk. & M.A. Curtis) M.E. Barr (1980) = Thaxteriella pezizula
- T. roraimensis (Samuels & E. Müll.) Boise (1986) = Thaxteriella roraimensis
- T. scopula (Peck) M.E. Barr (1980) = Acanthohelicospora scopula
- T. setosa Sivan. & W.H. Hsieh (1995) = Acanthostigmina minuta
- T. stromaticola (Henn.) Rossman (1979) = Puttemansia stromaticola
- T. trichella (Sacc., E. Bommer & M. Rousseau) Scheuer (1991) = Taphrophila trichella
- T. trichospora (Berk. & Broome) Petch (1977) = Ophionectria trichospora, Nectriaceae
- T. vermicularispora (I. Hino & Katum.) Sivan. (1984) = Chaetosphaerulina vermicularispora
- T. yasudae (I. Hino) Sivan. (1984) = Chaetosphaerulina yasudae
