= Byssosphaeria =

Scientific classification
- Kingdom: Fungi
- Division: Ascomycota
- Class: Dothideomycetes
- Order: Pleosporales
- Family: Melanommataceae
- Genus: Byssosphaeria; Cooke

Type species
- Byssosphaeria keitii (Berk. & Broome) Cooke

Genus of fungi

Byssosphaeria is a genus of fungi in the family Melanommataceae.

== Species ==
As accepted by Species Fungorum;

- Byssosphaeria alnea (Peck) M.E. Barr (1984)
- Byssosphaeria erumpens Chi Y. Chen & W.H. Hsieh (2004)
- Byssosphaeria erythrinae (B. Huguenin) M.E. Barr (1984)
- Byssosphaeria hainanensis (Teng) W.Y. Li & W.Y. Zhuang (2008)
- Byssosphaeria jamaicana (Sivan.) M.E. Barr (1984)
- Byssosphaeria juniperi (Tracy & Earle) You Z. Wang, Aptroot & K.D. Hyde (2004)
- Byssosphaeria macarangae Tennakoon, C.H. Kuo & K.D. Hyde (2018)
- Byssosphaeria musae Phook. & K.D. Hyde (2015)
- Byssosphaeria oviformis M.E. Barr (1984)
- Byssosphaeria phoenicis Kular. & K.D. Hyde (2022)
- Byssosphaeria rhodomphala (Berk.) Cooke (1887)
- Byssosphaeria salebrosa (Sacc.) M.E. Barr (1984)
- Byssosphaeria schiedermayriana (Fuckel) M.E. Barr (1984)
- Byssosphaeria semen (Cooke & Peck) M.E. Barr (1984)
- Byssosphaeria siamensis Boonmee, Q. Tian & K.D. Hyde (2015)
- Byssosphaeria taiwanense Tennakoon, C.H. Kuo & K.D. Hyde (2018)
- Byssosphaeria xestothele (Berk. & M.A. Curtis) M.E. Barr (1984)

Former species;

- B. aquila (Fr.) Stev. (1879) = Rosellinia aquila, Xylariaceae
- B. barbicincta Ellis & Everh. (1888) = Chaetosphaeria barbicincta, Chaetosphaeriaceae
- B. buxi (Fabre) Cooke (1887) = Dematophora buxi, Xylariaceae
- B. callimorpha (Mont.) Cooke (1887) = Dictyochaeta callimorpha, Chaetosphaeriaceae
- B. calyculus (Mont.) Cooke (1887) = Nitschkia calyculus, Nitschkiaceae
- B. conferta (Schwein.) Cooke (1887) = Scortechinia conferta, Scortechiniaceae
- B. corticium (Schwein.) Cooke (1887) = Rosellinia corticium, Xylariaceae
- B. corynephora Cooke (1883) = Trichosphaeria corynephora, Trichosphaeriaceae
- B. desmazieri (Berk. & Broome) Stev. (1879) = Rosellinia desmazieri, Xylariaceae
- B. diffusa Cooke (1887) = Herpotrichia diffusa, Melanommataceae
- B. epixantha (Berk. & Broome) Cooke (1887) = Hypoxylon epixanthum, Hypoxylaceae
- B. epochnii (Berk. & Broome) Cooke (1887) = Exosporiella fungorum, Ascomycota
- B. euomphala (Berk. & M.A. Curtis) Cooke (1887) = Tympanopsis confertula, Scortechiniaceae
- B. helicophila (Cooke) Cooke (1887) = Thaxteriella pezizula, Tubeufiaceae
- B. innumera (Berk. & Broome ex Tul. & C. Tul.) Cooke (1887) = Chaetosphaeria innumera, Chaetosphaeriaceae
- B. investans (Cooke) Cooke (1887) = Eriosphaeria investans, Trichosphaeriaceae
- B. keithii (Berk. & Broome) Cooke (1879) = Byssosphaeria schiedermayriana
- B. luteobasis (Ellis) Cooke (1887) = Endoxylina luteobasis, Sordariomycetes
- B. pachnostoma Berk. & M.A. Curtis ex Cooke (1887) = Pseudotrichia pachnostoma, Melanommataceae
- B. phaeostroma (Durieu & Mont.) Stev. (1879) = Chaetosphaerella phaeostroma, Chaetosphaerellaceae
- B. quercina (R. Hartig) Cooke (1887) = Rosellinia quercina, Xylariaceae
- B. thelena (Fr.) Stev. (1879) = Rosellinia thelena, Xylariaceae
- B. thelena var. elegans Duby ex Cooke (1887) = Rosellinia thelena, Xylariaceae
- B. tristis (J. Kickx f.) Cooke (1887) = Acanthonitschkea tristis, Nitschkiaceae
- B. villosa (Samuels & E. Müll.) Boise (1986) = Herpotrichia villosa, Melanommataceae
