= Xenolophium =

Scientific classification
- Kingdom: Fungi
- Division: Ascomycota
- Class: Dothideomycetes
- Order: Pleosporales
- Family: Melanommataceae
- Genus: Xenolophium; Syd.

Genus of fungi

Xenolophium is a genus of fungi in the family Melanommataceae.
