= Acanthostigma multiseptatum =

Scientific classification
- Kingdom: Fungi
- Division: Ascomycota
- Class: Dothideomycetes
- Order: Tubeufiales
- Family: Tubeufiaceae
- Genus: Acanthostigma
- Species: A. multiseptatum

Binomial name
- Acanthostigma multiseptatum Promputtha & Miller, 2010

Species of fungus

Acanthostigma multiseptatum is a species of fungus in the Tubeufiaceae family of fungi. It was isolated from decomposing wood in the Great Smoky Mountains National Park. A. multiseptatum differs from its cogenerate species by having longer asci and longer ascospores with more septa.
