= Micropolis =

Micropolis can refer to:

- A United States micropolitan area
- Micropolis Corporation, a hard disk manufacturer
- Micropolis (La Cité des Insectes), an insect museum in France
- The original working title for SimCity, a computer game
- Micropolis (video game), a re-release of the SimCity source code under the terms of the GNU General Public License
- Micropolis (Besançon), a sector of the area of Besançon (Doubs, France)
