= Acanthostigma septoconstrictum =

Scientific classification
- Kingdom: Fungi
- Division: Ascomycota
- Class: Dothideomycetes
- Order: Tubeufiales
- Family: Tubeufiaceae
- Genus: Acanthostigma
- Species: A. septoconstrictum

Binomial name
- Acanthostigma septoconstrictum Promputtha & Miller, 2010

Species of fungus

Acanthostigma septoconstrictum is a species of fungus in the Tubeufiaceae family of fungi. It was isolated from decomposing wood in the Great Smoky Mountains National Park. A. septoconstrictum differs from its cogenerate species by having longer setae and asci and broader, asymmetrical ascospores which are constricted at their septa.
