= A. portoricensis =

A. portoricensis may refer to:

- Acalypha portoricensis, a plant with nettle-like leaves
- Aeschynomene portoricensis, a flowering plant
- Alchorneopsis portoricensis, a plant native to Puerto Rico
- Amphinectria portoricensis, a fungus with pseudoparaphyses
- Anemia portoricensis, a flowering fern
- Antirhea portoricensis, synonym of Stenostomum portoricense, a plant endemic to Puerto Rico
- Apenes portoricensis, a ground beetle
- Aristida portoricensis, a grass endemic to Puerto Rico
