= Karl von Tubeuf =

German botanist (1862–1941)

Karl von Tubeuf FLS HFRSE
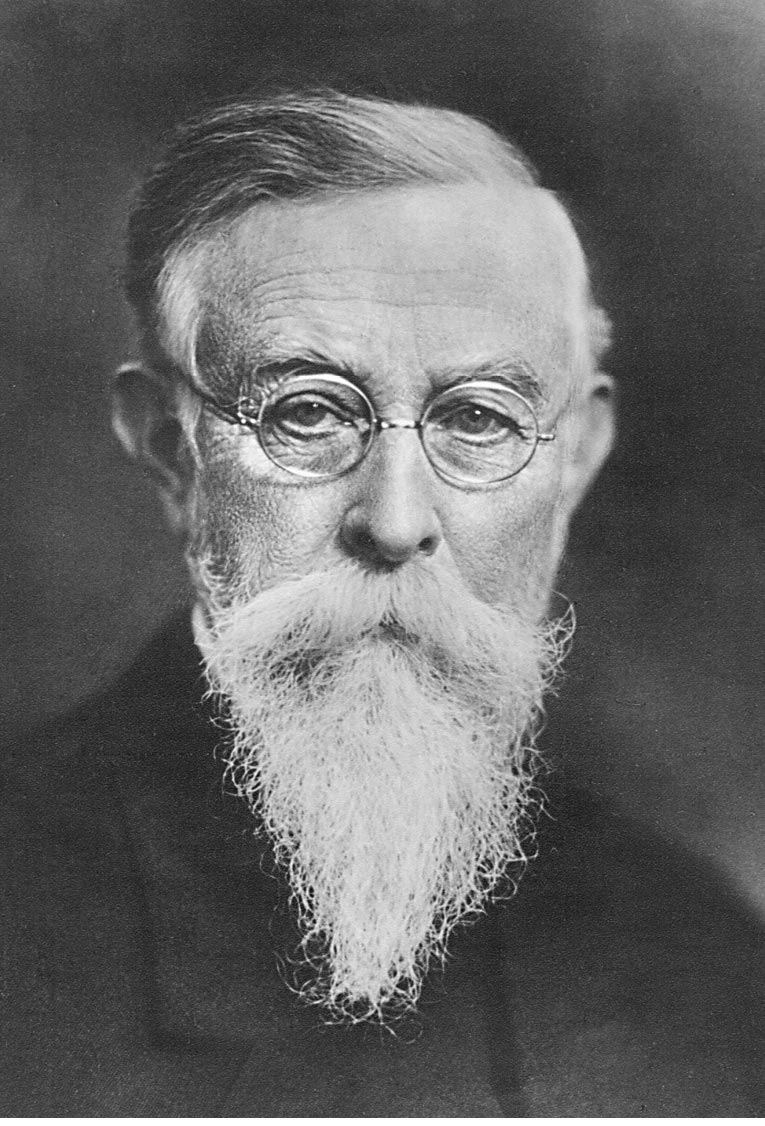
- Born: 20 January 1862; Amorbach, Kingdom of Bavaria
- Died: 8 February 1941 (aged 79); Munich, Germany
- Education: Aschaffenburg Forestry Institute; Ludwig-Maximilians-Universität München
- Known for: biological control
- Scientific career
- Fields: forest science mycology plant pathology

Carl or Karl von Tubeuf FLS HFRSE (20 January 1862 – 8 February 1941, in Munich, Germany) was a German forestry scientist, mycologist and plant pathologist. He introduced both the term biological control and the use of a biological control to manage a plant disease. He published one of the first books on plant diseases (in German, then translated into English.) In addition to foundational work in plant pathology, he published broadly on other topics including forest botany, dendrology, mycology, and zoology. He discovered new species of gall mites of conifers.

Tubeufstrasse in Munich is named after him.

== Life ==
Karl von Tubeuf was born in Amorbach on 20 January 1862 the son of Simon Anton Freiherr von Tubeuf (1822-1870), and his wife, Luise von Ploennies. He and his brother Anton von Tubeuf were educated at the Maximilian Gymnasium Munich.

Tubeuf studied forestry at the Aschaffenburg Forestry Institute in Aschaffenburg (1881-1883), and the Ludwig-Maximilians-Universität München (1883-1885), completing his dissertation “Cucurbitaria laburni on Cytisus laburnum” in 1886 with Robert Hartig. The two became more than professionally associated: Tubeuf married Hartig's daughter Edith (1870–1945).

In 1886, Tubeuf worked briefly for the Bavarian Forest Superintendent in Freising, as an assistant to Hartig, and as a substitute lecturer in forest botany at Technische Hochschule Karlsruhe. In 1887, he again returned to the Forest Research Institute as an assistant to Hartig, as well as working as a private lecturer at both the Ludwig-Maximilians-Universität München and the Polytechnische Schule München.

In 1895, Tubeuf published the German edition of his textbook on the diseases of plants. It was followed in 1897 by a translation into English as Diseases of Plants Induced by Cryptogamic Parasites.

In 1898, Tubeuf joined the Imperial Board of Health in Berlin, and acted as an Imperial Advisor, establishing a Government Institute of Biology. In 1901, he became Head of the Biological Division for Agriculture and Forestry in Berlin-Dahlem. On 1 April 1902, Tubeuf succeeded Robert Hartig as Professor of Plant Anatomy, Physiology, and Pathology at the Ludwig-Maximilians-Universität München. He remained there from 1902 to 1933 as a professor of forestry science.

Tubeuf founded the journal Forstlich-naturwissenschaftliche Zeitschrift (Forest Science Journal) in 1892 and founded and edited Praktische Blätter für Pflanzenschutz (Practical Journal for Plant Protection) in 1898. He and Lorenz Hiltner founded Naturwissenschaftliche Zeitschrift für Land- und Forstwirtschaft (Scientific Journal for Agriculture and Forestry) which ran from 1903 to 1920. Tubeuf also founded and edited Blätter für Naturschutz (Journal for Nature Conservation) and served as editor of Zeitschrift für Pflanzenkrankheiten und Pflanzenschutz (Journal of Plant Diseases and Plant Protection) from 1925 to 1936.

Tubeuf was the founding chairman of the Association for Nature Conservation in Bavaria, established on 26 June 1913 by the State Committee for Nature Conservation, the Bavarian Botanical Society, the Bavarian Ornithological Society and the Association for Natural History, with the support of Rupprecht, Crown Prince of Bavaria.

== Botanical Recognition ==
The fungi genus Tubeufia (Penz. & Sacc., 1897; family Tubeufiaceae) commemorates his name.

== Published works ==
His book Pflanzenkrankheiten durch kryptogame Parasiten verursacht, (1895) was later translated into English and published as Diseases of plants induced by cryptogamic parasites (1897). Other noted works by Tubeuf include:

- Beiträge zur Kenntniss der Baumkrankheiten, 1888 – Contributions to the knowledge of tree diseases.
- Samen, Früchte und Keimlinge der in Deutschland heimischen oder eingeführten forstlichen Culturpflanzen, 1891 – Seeds, fruit and seedlings of domestic and imported forest-cultivated plants.
- Die Haarbildungen der Coniferen, 1896 – Hair formations of conifers.
- Die Nadelhölzer mit besonderer Berücksichtigung der in Mitteleuropa winterharten Arten, 1897 – Conifers, with special consideration given to the hardy species in Central Europe.
- Der echte Hausschwamm und andere das Bauholz zerstörende Pilze (2nd edition, 1902) – Dry rot and other timber-destroying fungi.
- Monographie der Mistel, 1923 – Monograph on mistletoe.
