= Anomalemma =

Scientific classification
- Kingdom: Fungi
- Division: Ascomycota
- Class: Dothideomycetes
- Order: Pleosporales
- Family: Melanommataceae
- Genus: Anomalemma; Sivan.

Type species
- Anomalemma epochnii (Berk. & Broome) Sivan.

Genus of fungi

Anomalemma is a genus of fungi in the family Melanommataceae; according to the 2007 Outline of Ascomycota, the placement in this family is uncertain.
