= Acrocordiopsis =

Scientific classification
- Kingdom: Fungi
- Division: Ascomycota
- Class: Dothideomycetes
- Order: Pleosporales
- Family: Melanommataceae
- Genus: Acrocordiopsis; Borse & K.D. Hyde

Type species
- Acrocordiopsis patilii Borse & K.D. Hyde

Genus of fungi

Acrocordiopsis is a genus of fungi in the family Melanommataceae.
