= Javaria =

Scientific classification
- Kingdom: Fungi
- Division: Ascomycota
- Class: Dothideomycetes
- Order: Pleosporales
- Family: Melanommataceae
- Genus: Javaria; Boise

Type species
- Javaria samuelsii Boise

Genus of fungi

Javaria is a genus of fungi in the family Melanommataceae.
