= Acanthostigma filiforme =

Scientific classification
- Kingdom: Fungi
- Division: Ascomycota
- Class: Dothideomycetes
- Order: Tubeufiales
- Family: Tubeufiaceae
- Genus: Acanthostigma
- Species: A. filiforme

Binomial name
- Acanthostigma filiforme Promputtha & Miller, 2010

Species of fungus

Acanthostigma filiforme is a species of fungus in the Tubeufiaceae family of fungi. It was isolated from decomposing wood in the Great Smoky Mountains National Park. A. filiforme differs from its cogenerate species by having longer ascospores with more septa.
