= Byssocallis =

Scientific classification
- Kingdom: Fungi
- Division: Ascomycota
- Class: Dothideomycetes
- Order: Tubeufiales
- Family: Tubeufiaceae
- Genus: Byssocallis; Syd.

Type species
- Byssocallis phoebes Syd.

Genus of fungi

Byssocallis is a genus in the Tubeufiaceae family of fungi.
