= Pseudodidymella =

Scientific classification
- Kingdom: Fungi
- Division: Ascomycota
- Class: Dothideomycetes
- Order: Pleosporales
- Family: Melanommataceae
- Genus: Pseudodidymella; C.Z. Wei, Y. Harada & Katumoto

Type species
- Pseudodidymella fagi C.Z. Wei, Y. Harada & Katum.

Genus of fungi

Pseudodidymella is a genus of fungi in the class Dothideomycetes. It was later placed in the Melanommataceae family, in the order Pleosporales. As accepted by Wijayawardene et al. 2020;

It was thought to be a monotypic genus and contained the single species Pseudodidymella fagi C.Z. Wei, Y. Harada & Katum. (1997) Until Pseudodidymella minima A. Hashim. & Kaz. Tanaka was found in 2017, living on the leaves of Fagus japonica in Honshu, Japan.
