= Boerlagiomyces =

Scientific classification
- Domain: Eukaryota
- Kingdom: Fungi
- Division: Ascomycota
- Class: Dothideomycetes
- Order: Tubeufiales
- Family: Tubeufiaceae
- Genus: Boerlagiomyces; Butzin

Type species
- Boerlagiomyces velutinus (Penz. & Sacc.) Butzin

Genus of fungi

Boerlagiomyces is a genus in the Tubeufiaceae family of fungi.
