= Paranectriella =

Scientific classification
- Kingdom: Fungi
- Division: Ascomycota
- Class: Dothideomycetes
- Order: Tubeufiales
- Family: Tubeufiaceae
- Genus: Paranectriella (Henn. ex Sacc. & D. Sacc.) Höhn.

Type species
- Paranectriella juruana (Henn.) Höhn.

Genus of fungi

Paranectriella is a genus in the Tubeufiaceae family of fungi.
