= Calyptronectria =

Scientific classification
- Kingdom: Fungi
- Division: Ascomycota
- Class: Dothideomycetes
- Order: Pleosporales
- Family: Melanommataceae
- Genus: Calyptronectria; Speg.

Type species
- Calyptronectria platensis Speg.

Genus of fungi

Calyptronectria is a genus of fungi in the family Melanommataceae.

== Species ==
As accepted by Species Fungorum;

- Calyptronectria argentinensis Speg. (1909)
- Calyptronectria indica Dhaware (1980)
- Calyptronectria platensis Speg. (1909)

Former species; Calyptronectria ohiensis (Ellis & Everh.) M.E. Barr (1983) = Mattirolia ohiensis, Sordariomycetes
