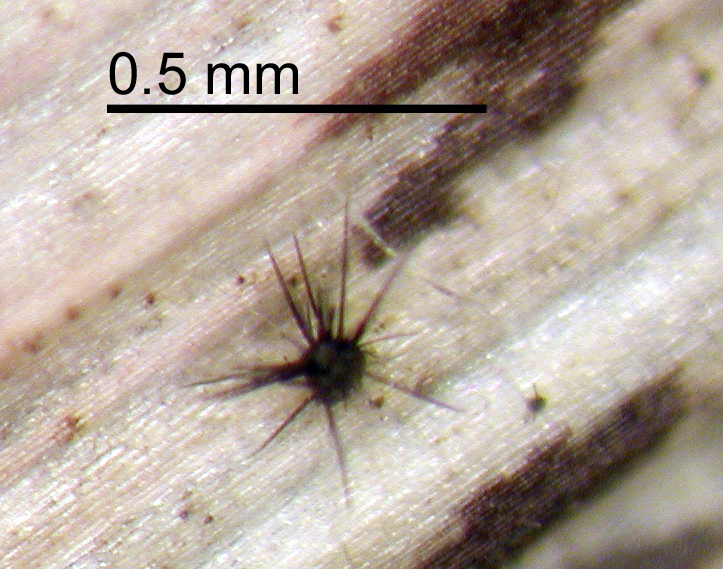
- Acanthophiobolus helicosporus

Scientific classification
- Domain: Eukaryota
- Kingdom: Fungi
- Division: Ascomycota
- Class: Dothideomycetes
- Order: Tubeufiales
- Family: Tubeufiaceae
- Genus: Acanthophiobolus; Berl.

Type species
- Acanthophiobolus helminthosporus

= Acanthophiobolus =

Genus of fungi

Acanthophiobolus is a genus in the Tubeufiaceae family of fungi, and was first described in 1893 by Augusto Napoleone Berlese.
