= Rebentischia =

Scientific classification
- Kingdom: Fungi
- Division: Ascomycota
- Class: Dothideomycetes
- Order: Tubeufiales
- Family: Tubeufiaceae
- Genus: Rebentischia; P. Karst.

Type species
- Rebentischia pomiformis P. Karst.

Genus of fungi

Rebentischia is a genus in the Tubeufiaceae family of fungi.

The genus name of Rebentischia is in honour of Johann Friedrich Rebentisch (1772-1810), who was a Polish-German botanist (Bryology, Mycology and Algology) from Neumark.

The genus was circumscribed by Petter Adolf Karsten in Syll. Fungorum (Saccardo) vol.2 on page 12 in 1883.

== Species ==
As accepted by Species Fungorum;

- Rebentischia abietis (Roum.) Y.M. Ahn & Shearer (1999)
- Rebentischia anodendri Tilak & R. Rao (1968)
- Rebentischia brevicaudata A.L. Guyot (1958)
- Rebentischia costi Bat., J.L. Bezerra & Matta (1963)
- Rebentischia elaeodendri Tilak & Srinivas. (1971)
- Rebentischia massalongoi (Mont.) Sacc. (1883)
- Rebentischia pomiformis P. Karst. (1869)
- Rebentischia taurica Naumov & Dobrozr. (1929)
- Rebentischia thujana Feltgen (1903)
- Rebentischia unicaudata (Berk. & Broome) Sacc. (1883)

Former species;

- R. appendiculosa (Berk. & Broome) Sacc. (1876), now Anthostomella appendiculosa Xylariaceae family
- R. typhae Fabre (1879), now Buergenerula typhae Magnaporthaceae family
