= Uredinophila =

Scientific classification
- Kingdom: Fungi
- Division: Ascomycota
- Class: Dothideomycetes
- Order: Tubeufiales
- Family: Tubeufiaceae
- Genus: Uredinophila; Rossman

Type species
- Uredinophila tropicalis (Speg.) Rossman

Genus of fungi

Uredinophila is a genus in the Tubeufiaceae family of fungi.
