= Thaxteriella =

Scientific classification
- Domain: Eukaryota
- Kingdom: Fungi
- Division: Ascomycota
- Class: Dothideomycetes
- Order: Tubeufiales
- Family: Tubeufiaceae
- Genus: Thaxteriella; Scheuer

Type species
- Thaxteriella corticola Petr.

Genus of fungi

Thaxteriella is a genus in the Tubeufiaceae family of fungi.

== Species ==
As accepted by Species Fungorum;

- Thaxteriella albo-ostiolata (Rossman) J.L. Crane, Shearer & M.E. Barr (1998)
- Thaxteriella amazonensis (Samuels, Rossman & E. Müll.) J.L. Crane, Shearer & M.E. Barr (1998)
- Thaxteriella corticola Petr. (1924)
- Thaxteriella corynespora (Munk) J.L. Crane, Shearer & M.E. Barr (1998)
- Thaxteriella indica Dharne & E. Müll. (1970)
- Thaxteriella lignicola Teng (1936)
- Thaxteriella macrospora (V.G. Rao & Varghese) J.L. Crane, Shearer & M.E. Barr (1998)
- Thaxteriella ovata (Rossman) J.L. Crane, Shearer & M.E. Barr (1998)
- Thaxteriella pezizula (Berk. & M.A. Curtis) Petr. (1953)
- Thaxteriella roraimensis Samuels & E. Müll. (1979)

Former species (all in Tubeufiaceae family);

- T. eugeniae Subhedar & V.G. Rao (1986) = Tubeufia eugeniae
- T. garugae C. Ramesh (1988) = Tubeufia garugae
- T. helicoma (W. Phillips & Plowr.) J.L. Crane, Shearer & M.E. Barr (1998) = Tubeufia helicoma
- T. inthanonensis Boonmee & K.D. Hyde (2011) = Helicoma inthanonense
- T. silentvalliensis V.G. Rao & Varghese (1980) = Tubeufia silentvalleyensis
