= Glaxoa =

Scientific classification
- Kingdom: Fungi
- Division: Ascomycota
- Class: Dothideomycetes
- Order: Tubeufiales
- Family: Tubeufiaceae
- Genus: Glaxoa; P.F. Cannon

Type species
- Glaxoa pellucida P.F. Cannon

Genus of fungi

Glaxoa is a genus in the Tubeufiaceae family of fungi. This is a monotypic genus, containing the single species Glaxoa pellucida.
