= Lichenotubeufia =

Scientific classification
- Kingdom: Fungi
- Division: Ascomycota
- Class: Dothideomycetes
- Order: Tubeufiales
- Family: Tubeufiaceae
- Genus: Lichenotubeufia; Etayo (2017)

Type species
- Lichenotubeufia eriodermatis (Etayo) Etayo 2017

Genus of fungi

Lichenotubeufia is a genus of fungi in the family Tubeufiaceae. The genus was established in 2017 by the Spanish scientist Javier Etayo and currently includes eight recognized species. These microscopic fungi live on lichens as parasites or decomposers, forming tiny dark fruiting bodies covered with short hairs that give them a fuzzy appearance under magnification. The fungi produce distinctive tube-shaped reproductive structures and are found in various locations where their lichen hosts grow.

== Taxonomy ==
The genus was circumscribed by Spanish mycologist and lichenologist Javier Etayo in 2017, with Lichenotubeufia eriodermatis assigned as the type species. The genus name combines Licheno- (referring to its association with lichens) with Tubeufia, referencing its placement within the family Tubeufiaceae. This family consists of fungi characterised by their distinctive tube-shaped reproductive structures.

== Description ==
Species of Lichenotubeufia are microscopic fungi that form small, dark-coloured fruiting bodies called ascomata on their lichen hosts. These ascomata measure between 120–200 micrometres (μm) in diameter and are typically yellowish-brown, becoming covered by short, dark hairs. The hairs give the structures a fuzzy appearance under magnification. The ascomata can be either white or cream-coloured, with the hairs being particularly prominent—measuring 2–4 times the width of the main body. These fungi produce two types of ascomata. The first, grouped ascomata, have shorter, thicker hairs and form clusters. The supporting structures (setae) are 5–8 cells across at their widest point, measuring 10–50 × 3.5–4.5 μm in length. The second, solitary ascomata, found individually on the host, these have longer, more slender hairs. Their setae are larger, reaching 100–150 μm in length and structured in 7–19 rows of cells, with measurements of 105–145 × 10–20 μm. The supporting base consists of 10–15 cells.

== Habitat and distribution ==
Lichenotubeufia species are parasitic or saprotrophic fungi, meaning they either feed on living lichens or decompose dead lichen tissue.

== Species ==
As of August 2025, Species Fungorum (via the Catalogue of Life) accepts eight species of Lichenotubeufia:

- Lichenotubeufia boomiana Etayo (2017)
- Lichenotubeufia cryptica Etayo & Flakus (2019)
- Lichenotubeufia eriodermatis (Etayo) Etayo (2017)
- Lichenotubeufia etayoi Zhurb. (2022)
- Lichenotubeufia heterodermiae (Etayo) Etayo (2017)
- Lichenotubeufia pannariae (Etayo) Etayo (2017)
- Lichenotubeufia tafallae Etayo (2017)
- Lichenotubeufia tibellii Zhurb. (2022)
