= Puttemansia =

Scientific classification
- Kingdom: Fungi
- Division: Ascomycota
- Class: Dothideomycetes
- Order: Tubeufiales
- Family: Tubeufiaceae
- Genus: Puttemansia; Henn.

Type species
- Puttemansia lanosa Henn.

Genus of fungi

Puttemansia is a genus in the Tubeufiaceae family of fungi.

The genus name of Puttemansia is in honour of Arsène Puttemans (1873–1937), who was a Belgian-Brazilian botanist (mycology) and plant pathologist, who taught plant pathology (about plant diseases) between 1903 and 1910 at the Polytechnic School of the University of São Paulo.

The genus was circumscribed by Paul Christoph Hennings in Hedwigia vol.41 (Issue 3) [104] on page 112 in 1902.
