= Requienia (plant) =

Scientific classification
- Kingdom: Plantae
- Clade: Tracheophytes
- Clade: Angiosperms
- Clade: Eudicots
- Clade: Rosids
- Order: Fabales
- Family: Fabaceae
- Subfamily: Faboideae
- Tribe: Millettieae
- Genus: Requienia; DC. (1825)

Species
- Requienia pseudosphaerosperma (Schinz) Brummitt; Requienia sphaerosperma DC.

Genus of legumes

Requienia is a genus of flowering plants in the family Fabaceae. It includes two species of herbs native to Botswana, Caprivi Strip, Namibia, and Zambia, and the Cape Provinces, Free State and Northern Provinces of South Africa. They grow on sand in dry tropical wooded grassland, shrubland, and bushland in the southern Zambezian region and the Kalahari and Highveld regions.

The genus name of Requienia is in honour of Esprit Requien (1788–1851), who was a French naturalist, who made contributions in the fields of conchology, palaeontology and especially botany.

The genus was circumscribed by Augustin Pyramus de Candolle in Mem. Fam. Legum. on page 224 in 1825.
