= Esprit Requien =

French naturalist (1788-1851)

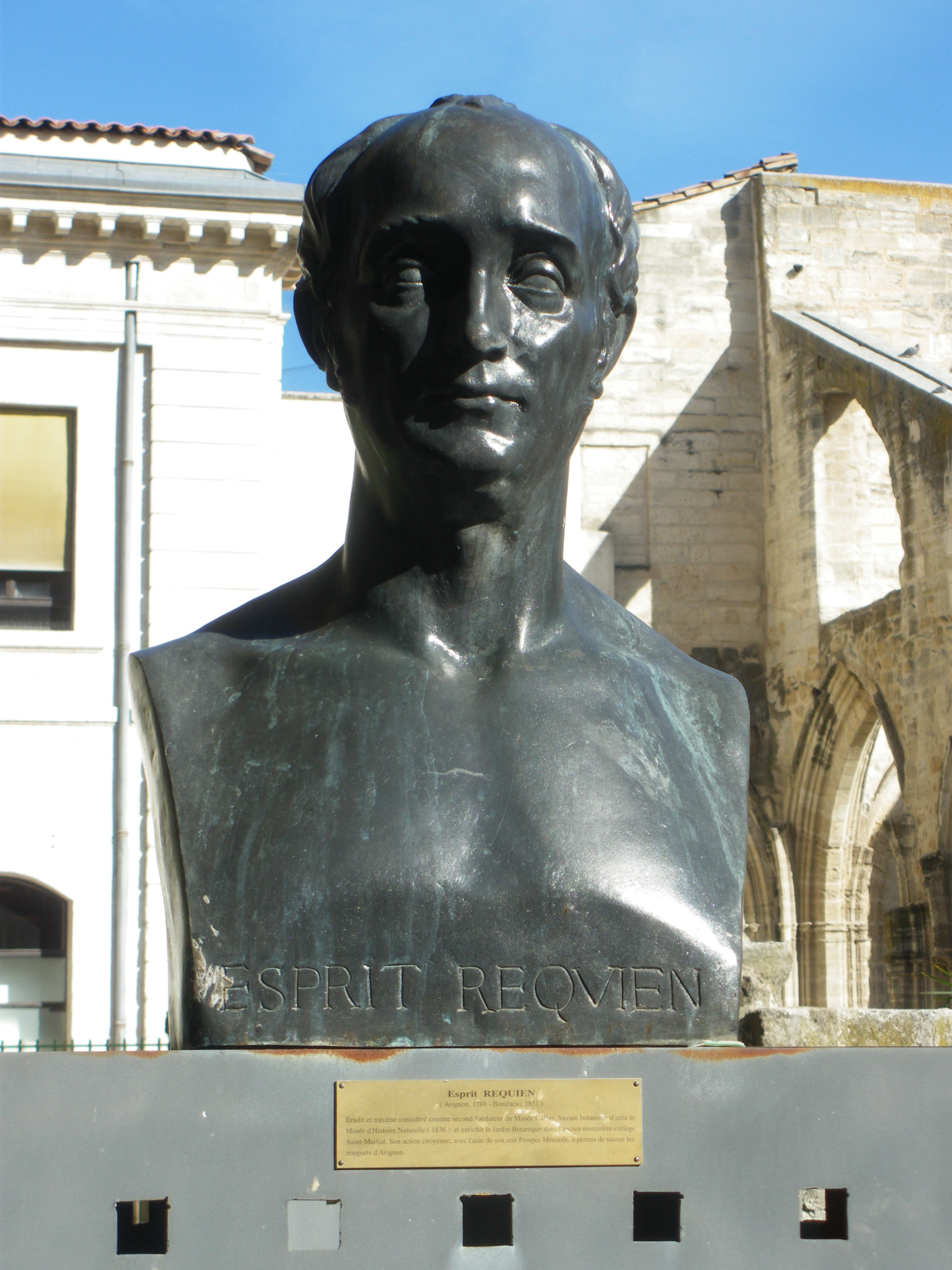
Bust of Esprit Requien in Avignon

Esprit Requien (6 May 1788, Avignon – 30 May 1851, Bonifacio, Corse-du-Sud) was a French naturalist, who made contributions in the fields of conchology, paleontology and especially botany.

From the age of 18, he was associated with the botanical garden in the city of Avignon. He performed extensive studies of flora native to Corsica and in the environs of Mont Ventoux. During his lifetime, he amassed an herbarium of 300,000 specimens.

In the fields of conchology and palaeontology, he conducted collecting expeditions to the Pyrenees, Catalonia and Italy. The natural history museum, Musée Requien, in Avignon is named in his honor.

He is the taxonomic authority of a monotypic plant genus Helxine, now treated as a synonym of Soleirolia soleirolii, in the nettle family Urticaceae. The genera of lichenized fungi, Requienella (author Jean-Henri Fabre) and the flowering plant Requienia (author Augustin Pyramus de Candolle) are named after him, as are plants with the specific and subspecific epithets of requienii.

The World Register of Marine Species lists 57 marine species names by Requien, most of which have become synonyms.

== Written works ==
- Observations sur quelques plantes rares ou nouvelles de la flore française, 1825 - Observations on some rare and new botanical species found in France.
- Catalogue des végétaux ligneux qui croissent naturellement en Corse, 1852 - Catalogue of woody plants native to Corsica.
- Bibliographie des journaux publiés à Avignon et dans le département de Vaucluse, 1837 - Bibliography of papers published in Avignon and in the department of Vaucluse.
- Dons faits au Museum Calve, 1839-1846 - Donations to the Museum Calve.
- Catalogue des coquilles de l'île de Corse, 1848 - a catalog of Corsican seashells.
