= Navicella (fungus) =

Scientific classification
- Kingdom: Fungi
- Division: Ascomycota
- Class: Dothideomycetes
- Order: Pleosporales
- Family: Melanommataceae
- Genus: Navicella; Fabre

Type species
- Navicella julii (synonym of Navicella pileata) Fabre

Genus of fungi

Navicella is a genus of fungi, that had been placed in the family Massariaceae. According to Wijayawardene et al. 2020, it is now placed in the Melanommataceae family.

"Navicella" is Italian for "small ship", and also found in English in reference to a mosaic by Giotto in St Peter's, Rome, now so often restored as to be effectively lost.

== Species ==
As accepted by Species Fungorum;

- Navicella costaricensis Elshafie & Aptroot (2005)
- Navicella diabola Aptroot (2003)
- Navicella pallida Aptroot (1998)
- Navicella pileata (Tode) Fabre (1879)
- Navicella xinjiangensis Z.Q. Yuan (1994)

Note; Species Fungorum has a list of 37 former species of Navicella that are synonyms of other species.
