= Asymmetricospora =

Scientific classification
- Kingdom: Fungi
- Division: Ascomycota
- Class: Dothideomycetes
- Order: Pleosporales
- Family: Melanommataceae
- Genus: Asymmetricospora; J. Fröhl. & K.D. Hyde

Type species
- Asymmetricospora calamicola J. Fröhl. & K.D. Hyde

Genus of fungi

Asymmetricospora is a genus of fungi in the family Melanommataceae.
