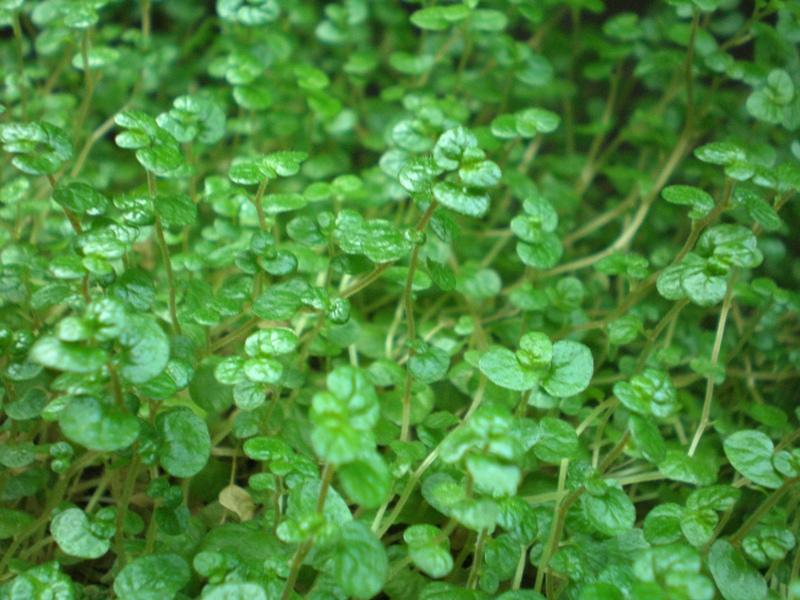

Scientific classification
- Kingdom: Plantae
- Clade: Embryophytes
- Clade: Tracheophytes
- Clade: Angiosperms
- Clade: Eudicots
- Clade: Rosids
- Order: Rosales
- Family: Urticaceae
- Genus: Soleirolia; Gaudich.
- Species: S. soleirolii

Binomial name
- Soleirolia soleirolii (Req.) Dandy

Synonyms
- Helxine soleirolii Req. Soleirolia corsica Gaudich. Parietaria corsica Spreng.

= Soleirolia =

Plant in the nettle family

Soleirolia soleirolii (/soʊˌliːəˈroʊliə soʊˌliːəˈroʊliˌaɪ, ˌsoʊlɪˈroʊ-/, syn. Helxine soleirolii) is a flowering plant in the nettle family. It has a number of common names, including baby's tears, angel's tears, peace in the home, bits and pieces, bread and cheese, Corsican creeper, Corsican curse, friendship plant, mind-your-own-business, pollyanna vine, Paddy's wig, and mother of thousands. It should not be confused with Kalanchoe daigremontiana, another plant known as mother of thousands.

== Description ==
It is a delicate-looking creeping herb with juicy bright green or yellow leaves and multitudes of tiny pink flowers, male and female separate. It grows close to the ground in mats and is sometimes used in ornamental gardens alongside ferns and other moisture-loving types of plant.

The leaves are usually slightly stalked, about 5 mm across. The minute female flowers produce oval seeds, while the male flowers produce pollen.

== Distribution ==
This species is native to Italy, Corsica and the Balearic islands. It has been introduced to many other places worldwide, including Europe, the Azores, west coast north and south America and Tasmania through the plant trade, and is cultivated (more or less) worldwide as an ornamental garden plant. It has been noted as growing in the northeastern Irish counties of Antrim and Down.

== Habitat ==
It can be grown indoors as a houseplant and used in habitats for diminutive reptiles, amphibians, and some invertebrates. It prefers shade and consistent to heavy moisture. It can also grow with the roots submerged (shoots immersed), or in swampy or riparian environments. In colder regions, the plant dies back during winter, but the roots regenerate; it returns with lush growth as temperatures increase.

Baby's-tears is commonly seen in calm, shaded garden areas, as well as in bonsai gardens. It is popular as an accent for water features in the garden; as it is quite a thirsty species, some gardeners plant it on the edges of small waterfalls, fountains, or within rocky crevices surrounding ponds or other aquatic features.

If given adequate moisture and protected from direct sun, Baby's-tears may grow prolifically, and is a common weed in many places. It is capable of vegetative reproduction, so to eradicate a problematic or invasive patch, the entire root system of the plant must be dug out and removed, and not only the exposed leaves; roots or pieces of root which remain buried can (and will) sprout new growth, unless water is completely denied to the plant, causing it to dehydrate. Nurseries grow several varieties, including gold, yellow, and white breeds, but the mossy-green type is most popular with gardeners.

This species, the only member of the monotypic genus, Soleirolia, was named after the French army engineer and plant collector Henri-Augustin Soleirol by his fellow French naturalist Esprit Requien. Soleirol, an amateur botanist, originally collected the plant in Corsica.
