= Letendraeopsis =

Scientific classification
- Kingdom: Fungi
- Division: Ascomycota
- Class: Dothideomycetes
- Order: Tubeufiales
- Family: Tubeufiaceae
- Genus: Letendraeopsis; K.F. Rodrigues & Samuels

Type species
- Letendraeopsis palmarum K.F. Rodrigues & Samuels

Genus of fungi

Letendraeopsis is a genus in the Tubeufiaceae family of fungi. This is a monotypic genus, containing the single species Letendraeopsis palmarum.
