= Acanthostigma =

Scientific classification
- Domain: Eukaryota
- Kingdom: Fungi
- Division: Ascomycota
- Class: Dothideomycetes
- Order: Tubeufiales
- Family: Tubeufiaceae
- Genus: Acanthostigma; De Notaris

Type species
- Acanthostigma perpusillum De Notaris

Genus of fungi

Acanthostigma is a genus in the Tubeufiaceae family of fungi. Three new species were reported in 2010, growing from decomposing wood in Great Smoky Mountains National Park in the United States.

The three new bitunicate ascomycetes belonging to the genus Acanthostigma are described from terrestrial decomposing wood collected from Great Smoky Mountains National Park, USA. Phylogenetic analyses of the nuclear ribosomal 28S large subunit and internal transcribed spacer region placed all three species in the Tubeufiaceae and confirmed morphological analyses that these are distinct species.
Expanded phylogenetic analyses of 28S large subunit including taxa throughout the Dothideomycetes confirmed the placement of Acanthostigma in the Tubeufiaceae.

Acanthostigma filiforme differs from other Acanthostigma species in having longer ascospores with more septa. Acanthostigma multiseptatum can be distinguished in having longer asci and longer ascospores with more septa.

Acanthostigma septoconstrictum differs in having longer setae and asci and broader, asymmetrical ascospores that are constricted at their septa. A dichotomous key to Acanthostigma species is provided.

== Species ==
- Acanthostigma affine
- Acanthostigma berenice
- Acanthostigma decastylum
- Acanthostigma ellisii
- Acanthostigma filiforme
- Acanthostigma hederae
- Acanthostigma longisporum
- Acanthostigma minutum
- Acanthostigma multiseptatum
- Acanthostigma perpusillum
- Acanthostigma revocatum
- Acanthostigma scopulorum
- Acanthostigma scopulum
- Acanthostigma septoconstrictum
