= Melioliphila =

Scientific classification
- Kingdom: Fungi
- Division: Ascomycota
- Class: Dothideomycetes
- Order: Tubeufiales
- Family: Tubeufiaceae
- Genus: Melioliphila; Speg.

Type species
- Melioliphila graminicola (F. Stevens) Speg.

Genus of fungi

Melioliphila is a genus in the Tubeufiaceae family of fungi.
