= Taphrophila =

Scientific classification
- Kingdom: Fungi
- Division: Ascomycota
- Class: Dothideomycetes
- Order: Tubeufiales
- Family: Tubeufiaceae
- Genus: Taphrophila; Scheuer

Type species
- Taphrophila cornu-capreoli Scheuer

Genus of fungi

Taphrophila is a genus in the Tubeufiaceae family of fungi.
