= Mamillisphaeria =

Scientific classification
- Kingdom: Fungi
- Division: Ascomycota
- Class: Dothideomycetes
- Order: Pleosporales
- Family: Melanommataceae
- Genus: Mamillisphaeria; K.D. Hyde, S.W. Wong & E.B.G. Jones (1996)

Genus of fungi

Mamillisphaeria is a monotypic genus of fungi in the family Melanommataceae.

It only contain one known species, Mamillisphaeria dimorphospora K.D. Hyde, S.W. Wong & E.B.G. Jones, which was published in Nova Hedwigia vol.62 (3-4) on page 515 in 1996.
