= Micropolis (La Cité des Insectes) =

Insect museum in France

Coordinates: 44°12′50″N 2°59′17″E

Micropolis, la cité des insectes (city of insects) is situated in the Lévézou region of France, at Saint-Léons, near Millau. Micropolis is a museum dedicated to the entomologist Jean-Henri Fabre and inspired by the film, Microcosmos, of 1996.

Micropolis is also a scientific centre with an experimental station on biodiversity. The covered building has 15 rooms spread over 2,400 square metres (26,000 sq ft). It has vast outdoor spaces, in particular a walk called the carnival of insects which is both a space for observing nature with a panorama of Mont Seigne (at 1,128 metres (3,701 ft), the second highest summit of Lévézou) and a fun area for evocation of insects through 11 figurative stations which present giant insects.
