= Thaxterina =

Scientific classification
- Domain: Eukaryota
- Kingdom: Fungi
- Division: Ascomycota
- Class: Dothideomycetes
- Order: Tubeufiales
- Family: Tubeufiaceae
- Genus: Thaxterina
- Species: T. multispora

Binomial name
- Thaxterina multispora Sivan., R.C. Rajak & R.C. Gupta

Genus of fungi

Thaxterina is a genus in the Tubeufiaceae family of fungi. This is a monotypic genus, containing the single species Thaxterina multispora.
