= Chaetosphaerulina =

Scientific classification
- Kingdom: Fungi
- Division: Ascomycota
- Class: Dothideomycetes
- Order: Tubeufiales
- Family: Tubeufiaceae
- Genus: Chaetosphaerulina; I. Hino

Type species
- Chaetosphaerulina yasudai I. Hino

Genus of fungi

Chaetosphaerulina is a genus in the Tubeufiaceae family of fungi.
