= Joseph-François Soleirol =

French Engineer and Botanist

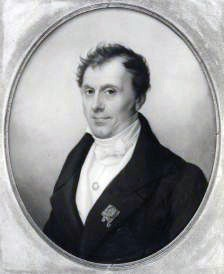
Joseph-François Soleirol

Joseph-François Soleirol (13 July 1781 in Verdun – 5 March 1853 in Metz) was a French army engineer and amateur botanist.

From 1800 he studied at the École Polytechnique, then embarked on a military career in which he attained the rank of captain in 1807. Later on, he served as an instructor at the École d'application de l'artillerie et du genie (School of artillery and engineering) in Metz. In 1841 he became a member of the Académie royale de Metz.

In the field of botany he collected numerous plant specimens in Lorraine. Joseph-François Soleirol has historically been given credit for extensive collections actually made by his younger brother, Henri-Augustin Soleirol (1792–1860) in Corsica, where the latter spent much of his career, also a military engineer. This confusion also concerns the collector of plant material distributed in an exsiccata-like specimen series with printed labels entitled Plantes de Corse.

The plant genus Soleirolia (Gaudich.; family Urticaceae) commemorates his name, as do species with the epithet of soleirolii. In 1843 he was co-founder of the Société d'horticulture in Metz. He also had a passion for music, and served as director of the Société philharmonique de Metz.

== Selected works ==
- Cahier classique sur le cours de construction, à l'usage des élèves de l'École royale de l'artillerie et du génie, (1819) – Classical book on construction, for use by students of the Royal School of Artillery and Engineering.
- Recueil d'expériences sur les mortiers de construction, suivi d'observations sur la manière d'opérer dans les recherches de ce genre, (1835) – Series of experiments on construction mortars.
- Recherches sur la stabilité des batardeaux en maçonnerie, (1841) – Research on the stability of masonry cofferdams.
- Quelques faits relatifs aux Ardennes observés en 1841, (1845) – Some facts about Ardennes observed in 1841.
- Une application de la géométrie descriptive, (1856–57) – An application of descriptive geometry.
