= Chaetocrea =

Scientific classification
- Kingdom: Fungi
- Division: Ascomycota
- Class: Dothideomycetes
- Order: Tubeufiales
- Family: Tubeufiaceae
- Genus: Chaetocrea; Syd.

Type species
- Chaetocrea parasitica Syd.

Genus of fungi

Chaetocrea is a genus in the Tubeufiaceae family of fungi. This is a monotypic genus, containing the single species Chaetocrea parasitica.
