= Acanthostigmella =

Scientific classification
- Domain: Eukaryota
- Kingdom: Fungi
- Division: Ascomycota
- Class: Dothideomycetes
- Order: Tubeufiales
- Family: Tubeufiaceae
- Genus: Acanthostigmella; Höhn.

Type species
- Acanthostigmella genuflexa Höhn.

Genus of fungi

Acanthostigmella is a genus in the Tubeufiaceae family of fungi.
