= Melanomma (fungus) =

Scientific classification
- Domain: Eukaryota
- Kingdom: Fungi
- Division: Ascomycota
- Class: Dothideomycetes
- Order: Pleosporales
- Family: Melanommataceae
- Genus: Melanomma; Nitschke ex Fuckel (1870)

Type species
- Melanomma pulvis-pyrius (Pers.) Fuckel (1870)

Synonyms
- Moriolopis Norman ex Keissl. (1927)

Genus of fungi

Melanomma is a genus of fungi in the family Melanommataceae. It probably evolved from a lichen ancestor, as it is closely related to many lichenized species of fungi.

== Species ==
- Melanomma acanthophilum Speg. (1924)
- Melanomma afflatum (Schwein.) Shear (1941)
- Melanomma anceps Höhn. (1909)
- Melanomma andinum Speg. (1909)
- Melanomma artemisiae-maritimae Lobik (1928)
- Melanomma aspegrenii (Fr.) Fuckel (1870)
- Melanomma aurantiicola Speg. (1921)
- Melanomma aurantiiphila Speg. (1921)
- Melanomma australiense K.D.Hyde & Goh (1999)
- Melanomma brachythele (Berk. & Broome) Sacc. (1883)
- Melanomma bubakii Rehm (1914)
- Melanomma cacheutense Speg. (1909)
- Melanomma caesalpiniae Henn. (1908)
- Melanomma caryophagum (Schwein.) Fairm. (1921)
- Melanomma castillejae Murashk. (1924)
- Melanomma ceratoniae Rolland (1905)
- Melanomma chilense Speg. (1910)
- Melanomma citricola Syd., P.Syd. & E.J.Butler (1911)
- Melanomma conjunctum (Petr.) L.Holm (1968)
- Melanomma corticis Kirschst. (1911)
- Melanomma cryptostegiae R.Rao & Modak (1973)
- Melanomma cucurbitarioideum Z.Q.Yuan & M.E.Barr (1994)
- Melanomma dactylosporum Rehm (1901)
- Melanomma dinghuense Inderb. (2001)
- Melanomma distinctum Lar.N.Vassiljeva (1987)
- Melanomma drimydis Rehm (1901)
- Melanomma dryinum Mouton (1900)
- Melanomma dzungaricum (Kravtzev) Vasyag., Byzova & Tartenova (1987)
- Melanomma ebeni Gonz. Frag. (1918)
- Melanomma epiphytica Racib. (1909)
- Melanomma gigantica A.Pande (1979)
- Melanomma glumarum I.Miyake (1910)
- Melanomma gregarium Ellis & Everh. (1900)
- Melanomma halimodendri Kravtzev (1960)
- Melanomma haloxyli Kravtzev (1955)
- Melanomma helianthemi Gucevič (1970)
- Melanomma heraclei Gucevič (1960)
- Melanomma herpotrichum Feltgen (1903)
- Melanomma japonicum A.Hashim. & Kaz.Tanaka (2017)
- Melanomma jenynsii (Berk. & Broome) Sacc. (1883)
- Melanomma juniperi Ellis & Everh. (1905)
- Melanomma langloisii (Ellis & Everh.) Berl. (1890)
- Melanomma lithophilae Gucevič (1959)
- Melanomma longicolle Sacc. (1875)
- Melanomma marathawadense Tilak, S.B.Kale & S.V.S.Kale (1971)
- Melanomma margaretae Chleb. (2002)
- Melanomma martinianum (Linds.) Sacc. (1883)
- Melanomma mate Speg. (1908)
- Melanomma medium Sacc. & Speg. (1878)
- Melanomma mindorense Rehm (1913)
- Melanomma mojunkumica Kravtzev (1955)
- Melanomma moravicum Petr. (1968)
- Melanomma mutabile Feltgen (1901)
- Melanomma myricae K.Holm & L.Holm (1991)
- Melanomma nigriseda Fairm. (1922)
- Melanomma obliterans (Berk. & Broome) Sacc. (1883)
- Melanomma obtusissimum Speg. (1921)
- Melanomma oryzae Hara (1918)
- Melanomma oxysporum (Zahlbr.) D.Hawksw. (1985)
- Melanomma panici-miliacei Murashk. (1938)
- Melanomma philippinense Syd. & P.Syd. (1914)
- Melanomma populicola Crous & R.K.Schumach. (2020)
- Melanomma praeandinum Speg. (1909)
- Melanomma pulveracea Teng & S.H.Ou (1936)
- Melanomma pulvis-pyrius (Pers.) Fuckel (1870)
- Melanomma pyriostictum Cooke (1887)
- Melanomma rhododendri Rehm (1881)
- Melanomma ribis (Tracy & Earle) M.E.Barr (1990)
- Melanomma rubicundum (Rehm ex G.Winter) L.Holm (1957)
- Melanomma sanguinarium Sacc. (1883)
- Melanomma saviczii Gucevič (1960)
- Melanomma scrophulariae Gucevič (1967)
- Melanomma sordidissimum Speg. (1909)
- Melanomma sparsum Fuckel (1874)
- Melanomma spiniferum Ellis & Everh. (1892)
- Melanomma subandinum Speg. (1912)
- Melanomma subdispersum (P.Karst.) Berl. & Voglino (1886)
- Melanomma submojunkumica Kravtzev (1955)
- Melanomma thespesiae C.Ramesh (1994)
- Melanomma trevoae Speg. (1910)
- Melanomma vile (Fr.) Fuckel (1870)
- Melanomma xylariae Höhn. (1907)
