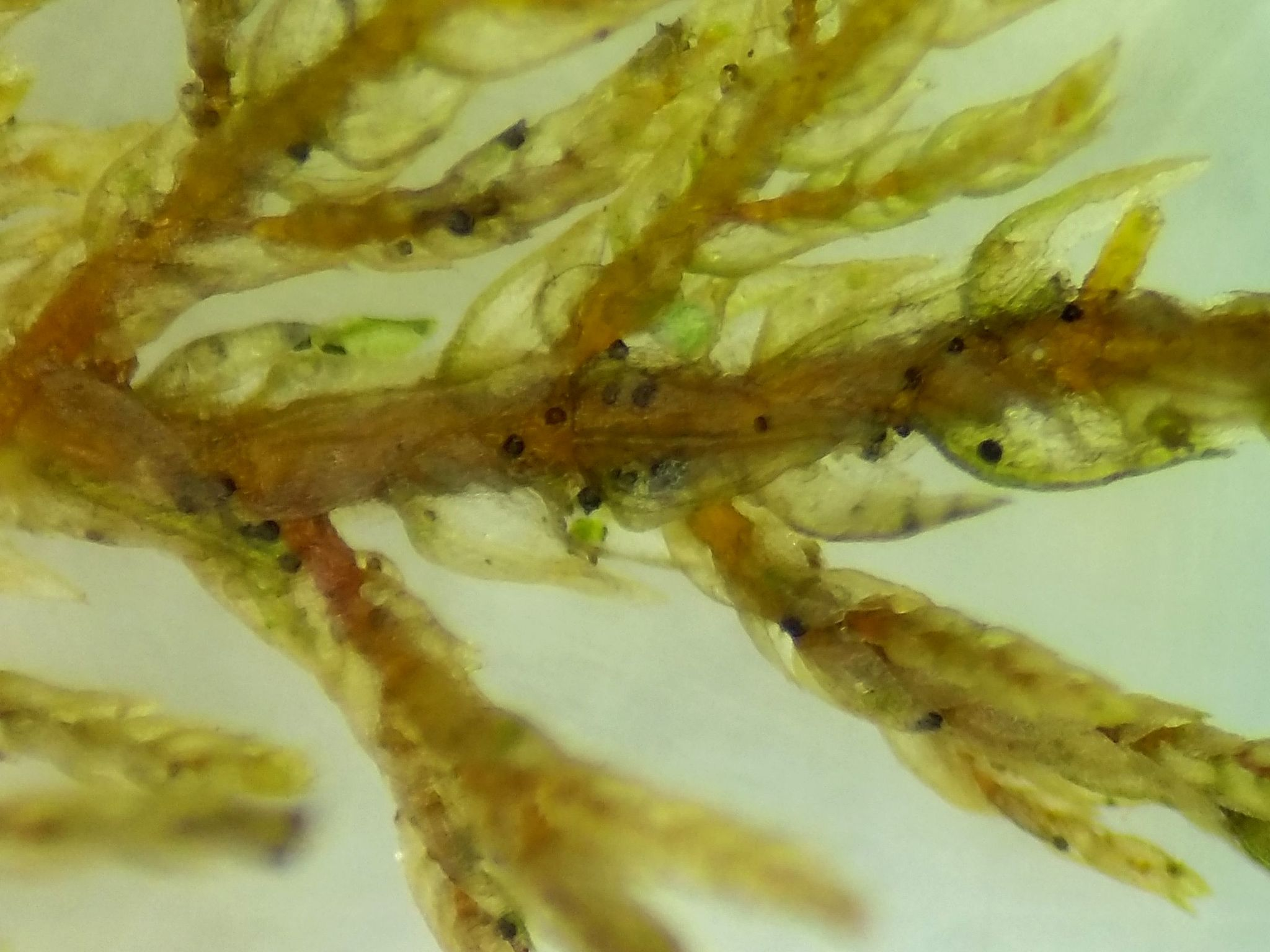
- Bryobroma velenovskyi

Scientific classification
- Kingdom: Fungi
- Division: Ascomycota
- Class: Dothideomycetes
- Subclass: Dothideomycetidae
- Family: Pseudoperisporiaceae; Toro

Type genus
- Pseudoperisporium Toro

= Pseudoperisporiaceae =

Family of fungi

The Pseudoperisporiaceae are a family of fungi with an uncertain taxonomic placement in the class Dothideomycetes.
