= Museum Requien =

Natural history museum in Avignon, France

Coordinates: 43°56′48″N 4°48′13″E

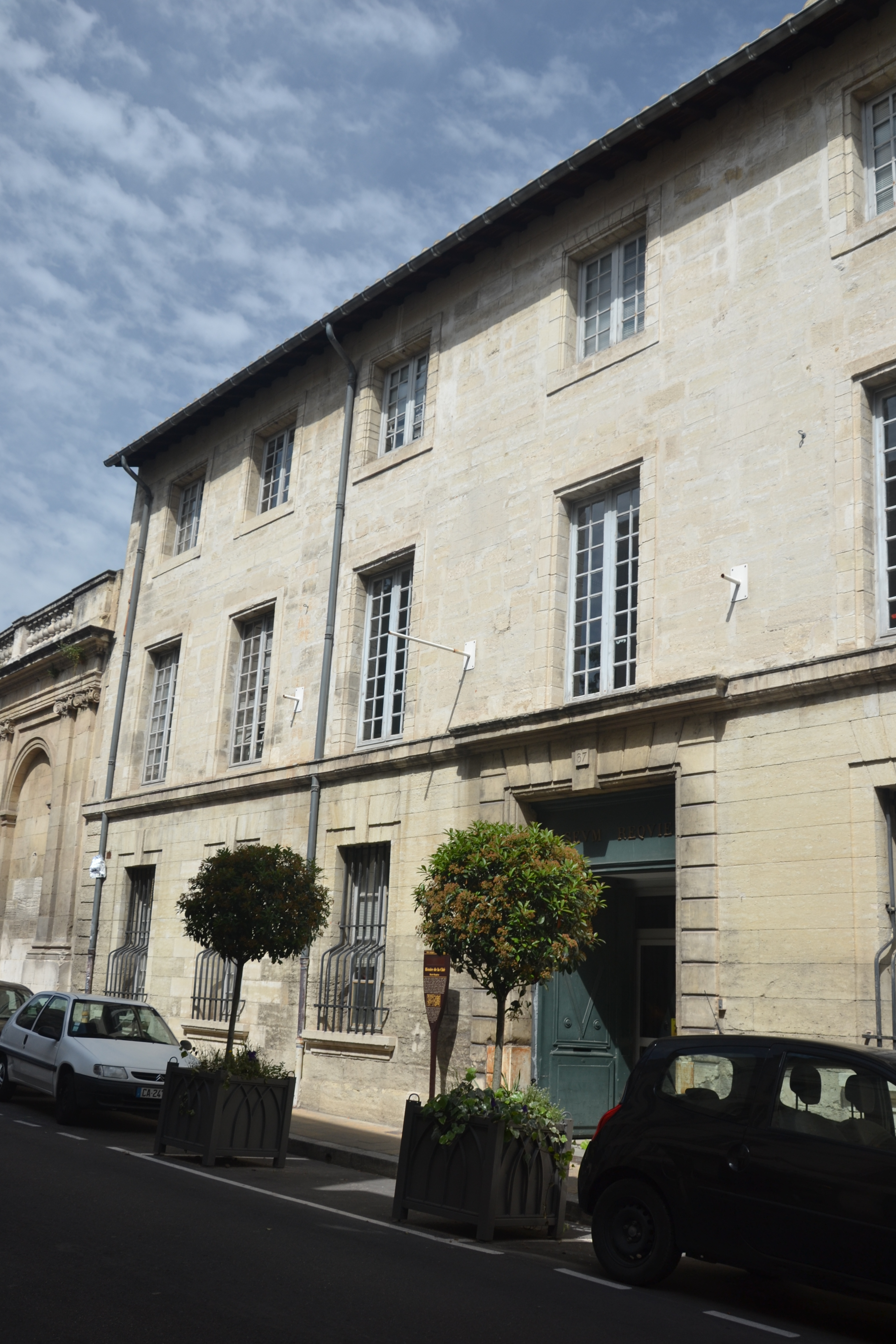
facade of the Requien museum in Avignon

Museum Requien (and not Musée Requien) is a natural history museum in Avignon, France. Some of Jean Henri Fabre's work is displayed here.

Muséum Requien is named in honor of French naturalist Esprit Requien (6 May 1788, Avignon – 30 May 1851, Bonifacio, Corse-du-Sud).

== History ==
The Muséum Requien was founded by Esprit Requien in 1840 as a cabinet of curiosities. Esprit Requien, botanist, paleontologist, malacologist and naturalist from Avignon, was born on May 6, 1788, in a very modest residence, near the rue des Lices in Avignon. He died on May 30, 1851, in Bonifacio. He became administrator of the Calvet museum in 1849. An enlightened collector, he had already bequeathed his funds nine years earlier. The collections are then regularly supplemented by local researchers and scientists, in particular by Jean-Henri Fabre. The museum moved into the Raphélis de Soissans hotel in 1943, on three levels.

== Museum activities ==
The most visible activity is the museum itself, retracing the fauna and flora of Vaucluse since prehistoric times. At the same time, research activity is maintained, at national and European level, in particular by consulting the 18,000 books in the Esprit Requien library.
