= Lacrymospora =

Scientific classification
- Domain: Eukaryota
- Kingdom: Fungi
- Division: Ascomycota
- Class: Eurotiomycetes
- Order: Pyrenulales
- Family: Pyrenulaceae
- Genus: Lacrymospora; Aptroot

Type species
- Lacrymospora parasitica Aptroot

Genus of fungi

Lacrymospora is a genus of fungi in the family Pyrenulaceae. It is a monotypic genus, containing the single species Lacrymospora parasitica.
