= Parapyrenis =

Scientific classification
- Kingdom: Fungi
- Division: Ascomycota
- Class: Eurotiomycetes
- Order: Pyrenulales
- Family: Pyrenulaceae
- Genus: Parapyrenis; Aptroot

Type species
- Parapyrenis aurora (Zahlbr.) Aptroot

Genus of fungi

Parapyrenis is a genus of fungi in the family Pyrenulaceae.
