= Amphinectria =

Scientific classification
- Domain: Eukaryota
- Kingdom: Fungi
- Division: Ascomycota
- Class: Dothideomycetes
- Order: Tubeufiales
- Family: Tubeufiaceae
- Genus: Amphinectria
- Species: A. portoricensis

Binomial name
- Amphinectria portoricensis Spegazzini

Genus of fungi

Amphinectria is a genus in the Tubeufiaceae family of fungi. This is a monotypic genus, containing the single species Amphinectria portoricensis, first described scientifically by Carlo Luigi Spegazzini in 1924.
