= Saint-Léons =

Commune in Occitanie, France

- Commune
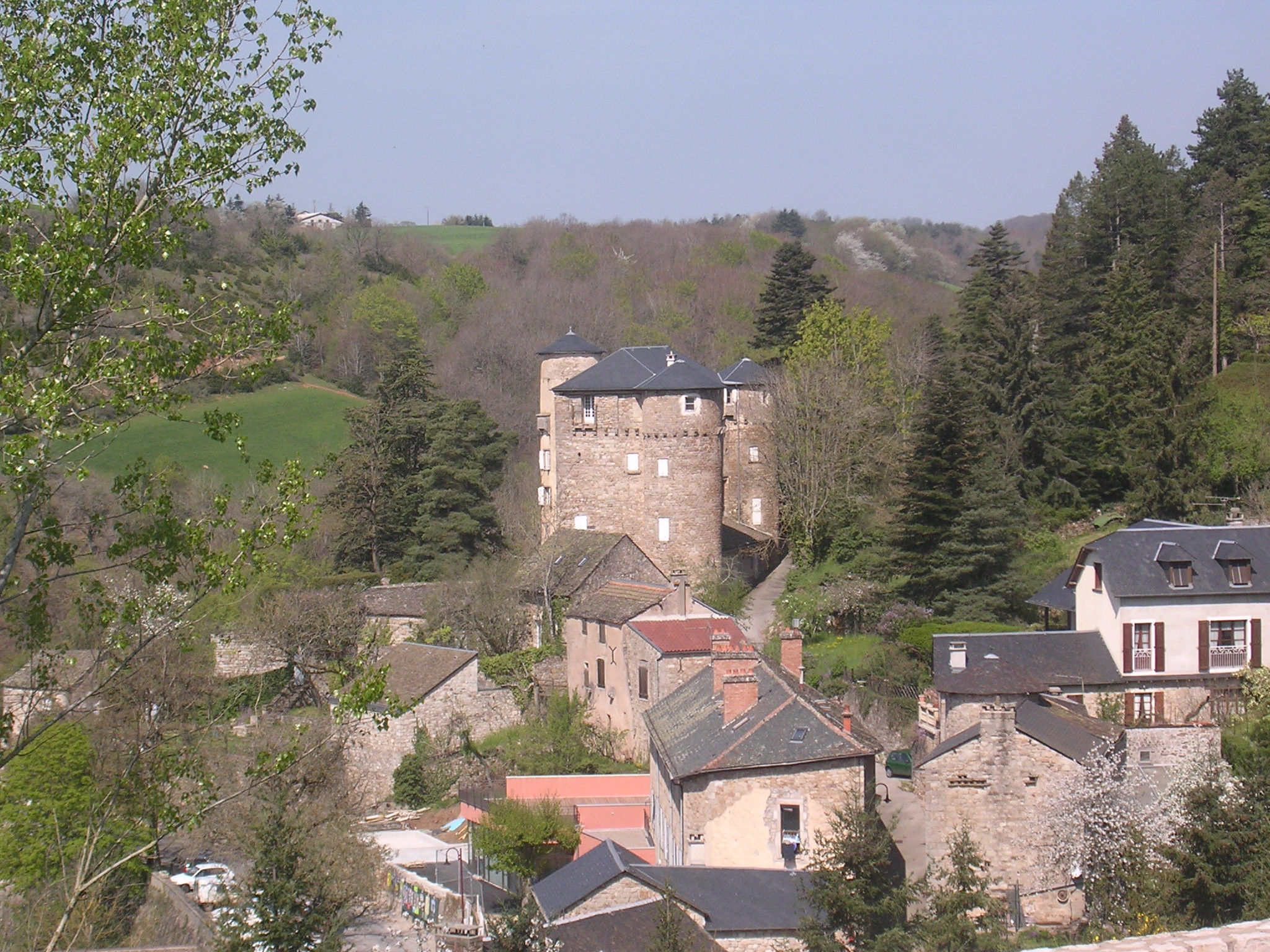
- The chateau and surrounding buildings in Saint-Léons

- Coat of arms
- Location of Saint-Léons
- Location within France Location within Occitanie
- Coordinates: 44°12′59″N 2°59′12″E
- Country: France
- Region: Occitania
- Department: Aveyron
- Arrondissement: Millau
- Canton: Raspes et Lévezou
- Intercommunality: Lévézou Pareloup

Government
  - Mayor (2020–2026): Jean-Michel Arnal
- Area^{1}: 32.89 km^{2} (12.70 sq mi)
- Elevation: 710 m (2,330 ft)
- Highest elevation: 981 m (3,219 ft)
- Lowest elevation: 506 m (1,660 ft)
- Population (2023): 424
  - Density: 12.9/km^{2} (33.4/sq mi)
- Time zone: UTC+01:00 (CET)
  - Summer (DST): UTC+02:00 (CEST)
- INSEE/Postal code: 12238 /12780
- ^{1} French Land Register data, which excludes lakes, ponds, glaciers > 1 km^{2} (0.386 sq mi or 247 acres) and river estuaries.

Saint-Léons (Languedocien: Sant Liònç) is a commune in the Aveyron department in southern France.

It was the birthplace of the entomologist Jean-Henri Fabre (1823–1915).

== Population ==
Historical population
Year	Pop.	±% p.a.
1968	291	—
1975	306	+0.72%
1982	308	+0.09%
1990	288	−0.84%
1999	301	+0.49%
2007	340	+1.53%
2012	367	+1.54%
2017	398	+1.64%
2023	424	+1.06%
Source: INSEE

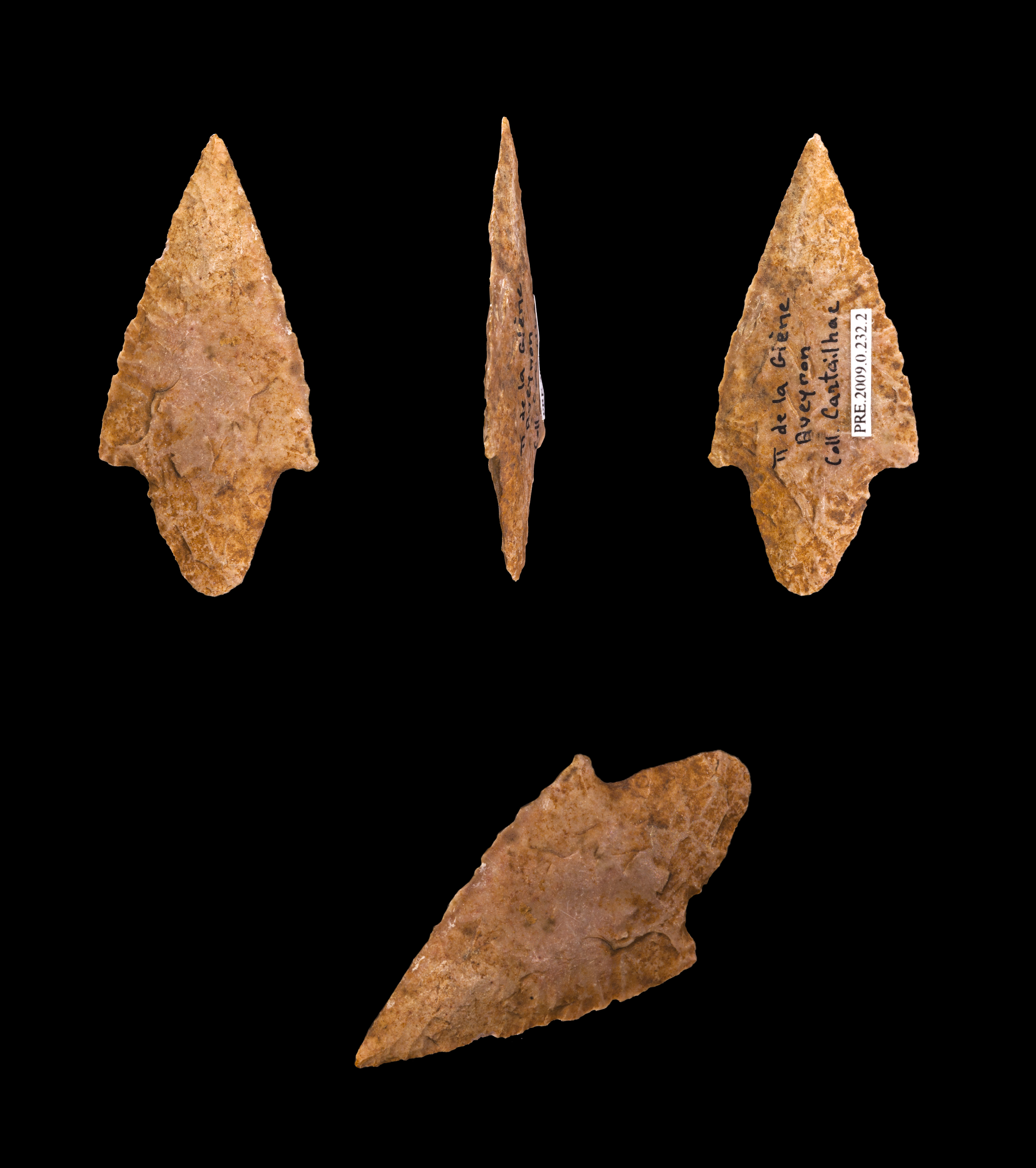
Neolithic arrowheads Muséum de Toulouse

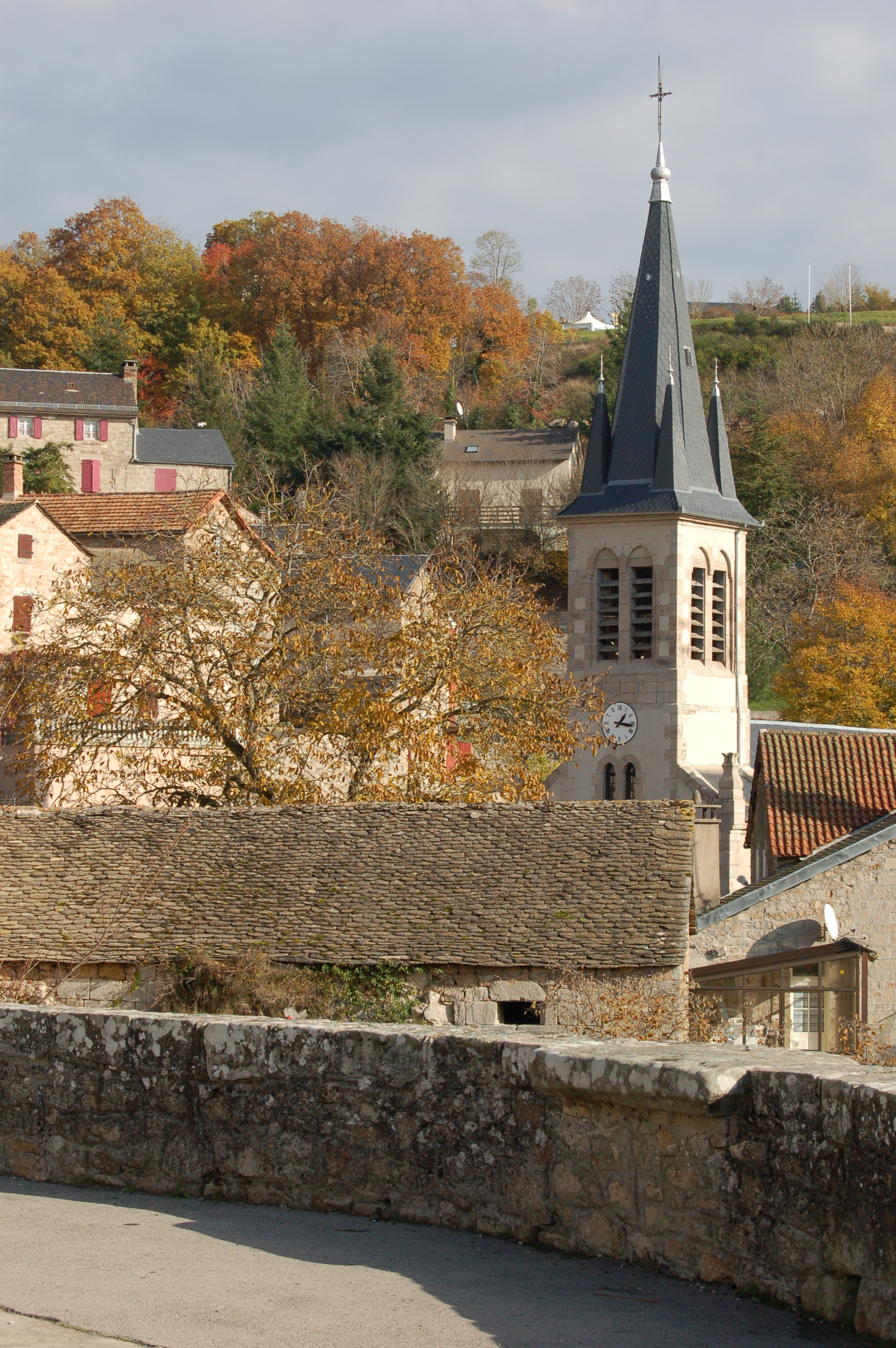
Church of Saint-Léons

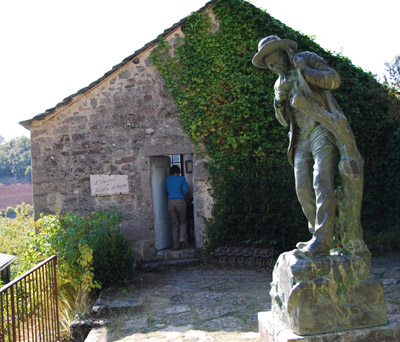
Birthplace of Jean-Henri Fabre

== See also ==
- Communes of the Aveyron department
