= Thaxteriella pezizula =

Scientific classification
- Kingdom: Fungi
- Division: Ascomycota
- Class: Dothideomycetes
- Order: Tubeufiales
- Family: Tubeufiaceae
- Genus: Thaxteriella
- Species: T. pezizula

Binomial name
- Thaxteriella pezizula (Berk. & M.A. Curtis) M.E. Barr, (1980)

Synonyms
- Sphaeria pezizula Berk. & M.A. Curtis, Grevillea 4(no. 31): 106 (1876); Lasiosphaeria pezizula (Berk. & M.A. Curtis) Sacc., Syll. fung. (Abellini) 2: 195 (1883); Herpotrichia pezizula (Berk. & M.A. Curtis) Pat., in Duss, Enum. Champ. Guadeloupe (Lons-le-Saunier): 72 (1903); Tubeufia pezizula (Berk. & M.A. Curtis) M.E. Barr, Mycotaxon 12(1): 157 (1980); Helicosporium fuckelii Fresen., Beitr. Mykol. 3: 101 (1863); Helicoma muelleri Fuckel, Fungi rhenani exsic., fasc. 2: no. 105 (1863); Helicoma curtisii Berk., Grevillea 3(no. 27): 106 (1875); Helicosporium curtisii (Berk.) Sacc., Syll. fung. (Abellini) 4: 560 (1886); Helicomyces curtisii (Berk.) Pound & Clem., Minn. bot. Stud. 1(Bulletin 9): 658 (1896); Sphaeria helicophila Cooke, Grevillea 6(no. 40): 145 (1878); Melanomma helicophilum (Cooke) Sacc., Syll. fung. (Abellini) 2: 112 (1883); Byssosphaeria helicophila (Cooke) Cooke, Grevillea 15(no. 76): 123 (1887)

Species of fungus

Thaxteriella pezizula is a fungal plant pathogen, known for infecting sweetgums (Liquidambar sp). The fungus is saprobic on woody substrates. It has a mycelium (root-like structure) that forms a dense velvety subiculum (support) on the surface of the bark, which consists of black hyphae.

The fungus was published by (Berk. & M.A. Curtis) Petr. in Sydowia 7(1-4): 110 in 1953.

It is found in North America, Central America, South America, Europe, New Zealand and Australia.
