= Acrocordiella =

Scientific classification
- Kingdom: Fungi
- Division: Ascomycota
- Class: Eurotiomycetes
- Order: Pyrenulales
- Family: Pyrenulaceae
- Genus: Acrocordiella; O.E. Erikss.

Genus of fungi

Acrocordiella is a genus of fungi in the family Pyrenulaceae. It was in the family Requienellaceae.

== Species ==
As accepted by Species Fungorum;

- Acrocordiella occulta (Romell) O.E. Erikss. (1982)
- Acrocordiella omanensis Maharachch., K.D. Hyde & Al-Sadi (2018)
- Acrocordiella photiniicola Samarak. & K.D. Hyde (2022) Requienellaceae
- Acrocordiella yunnanensis L.S. Dissan., J.C. Kang & K.D. Hyde (2021) Requienellaceae
