= Jean-Henri Fabre =

French naturalist, entomologist and author

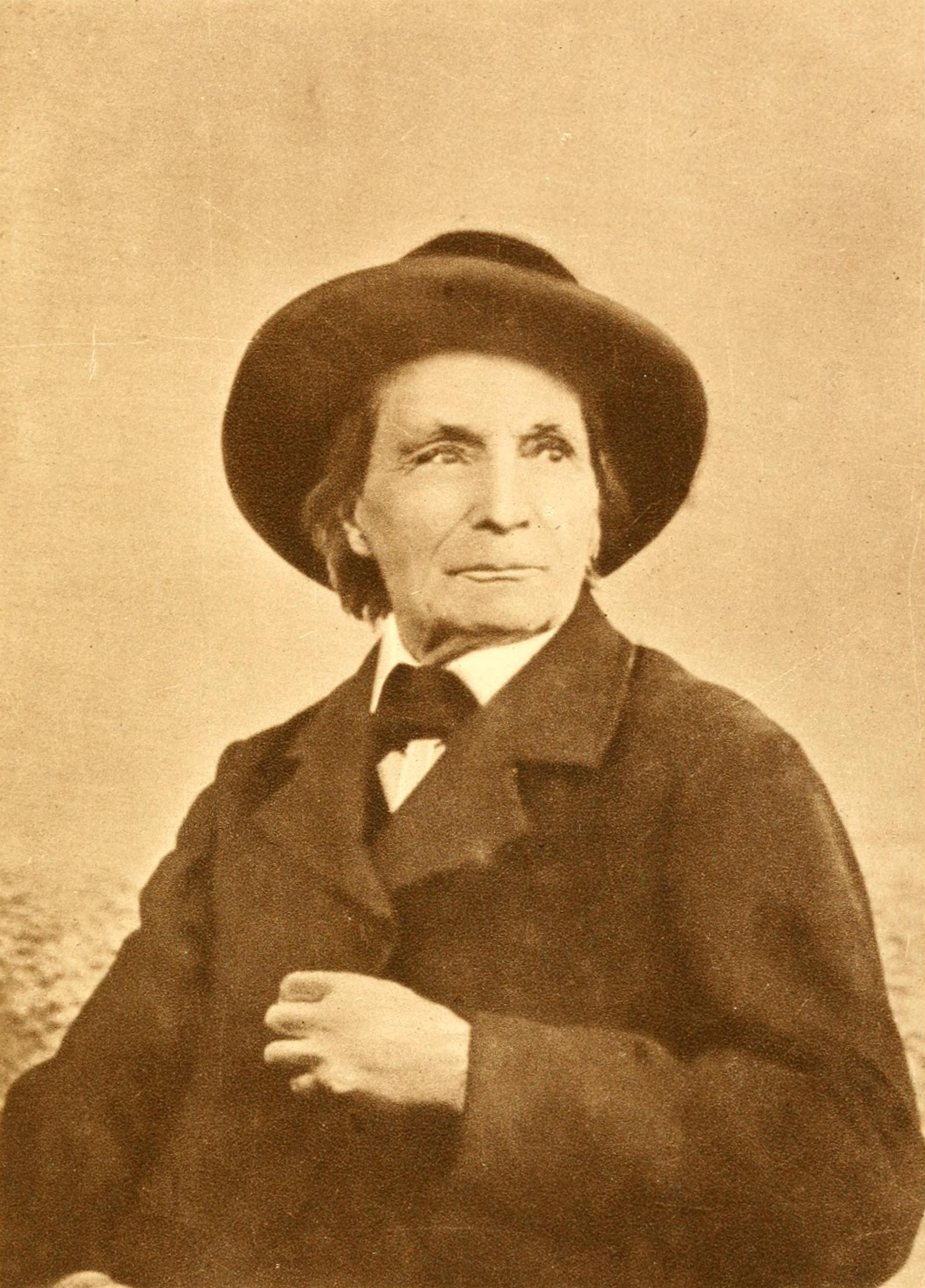
- Born: 21 December 1823; Saint-Léons, Aveyron, France
- Died: 11 October 1915 (aged 91); Sérignan-du-Comtat, Vaucluse, France
- Known for: Souvenirs Entomologiques (texts on insects and arachnids)
- Scientific career
- Fields: Entomology
- Thesis: Recherches sur l'anatomie des organes reproducteurs, et sur le développement des myriapodes (1855)
- Author abbrev. (zoology): Fabre

Jean-Henri Casimir Fabre (French pronunciation: [ʒɑ̃ ɑ̃ʁi kazimiʁ fabʁ]; 21 December 1823 – 11 October 1915) was a French naturalist, entomologist, and author known for the lively style of his popular books on the lives of insects.

== Biography ==
Fabre was born on 21 December 1823 in Saint-Léons in Aveyron, France. Fabre was largely an autodidact, owing to the poverty of his family. Nevertheless, he acquired a primary teaching certificate at the age of 19 and began teaching in Carpentras whilst pursuing further studies. In 1849, he was appointed to a teaching post in Ajaccio (Corsica), then in 1853 moved on to the lycée in Avignon.

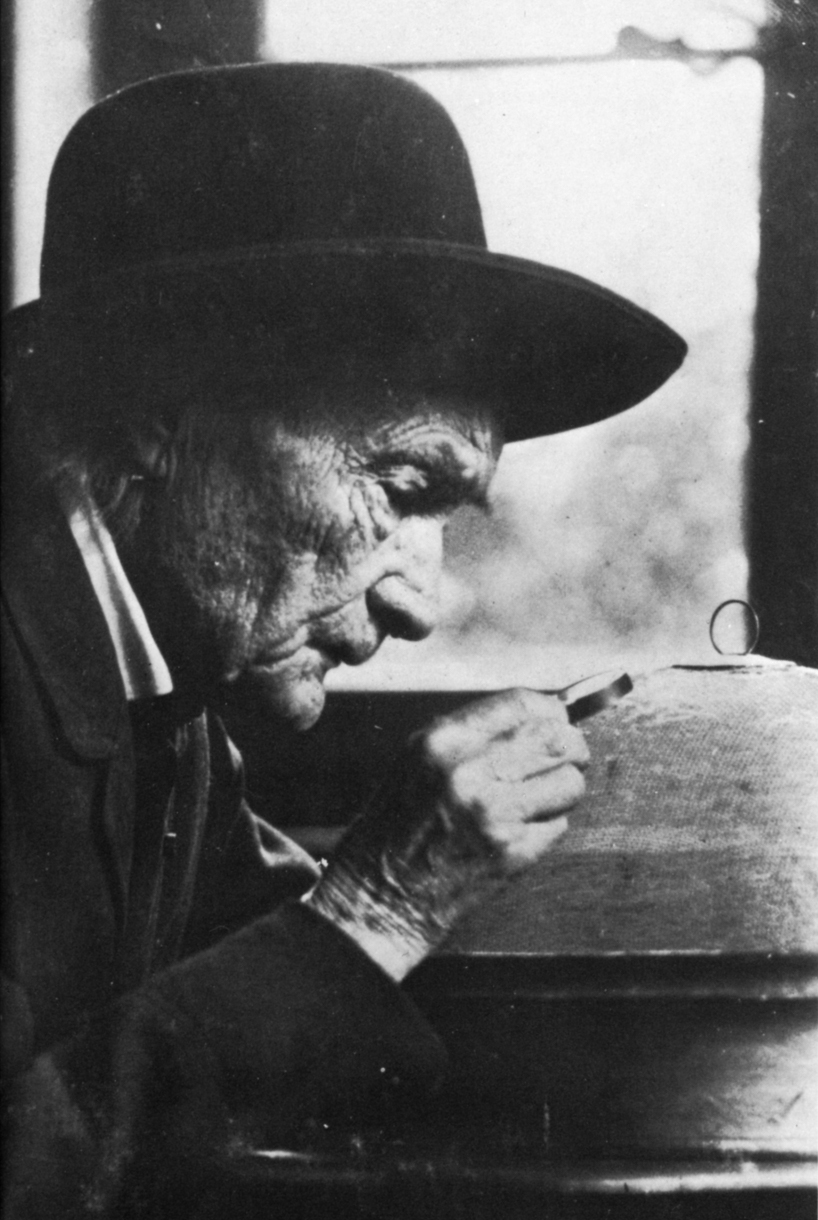
Jean Henri Fabre by Nadar

Fabre was a popular teacher, physicist, chemist and botanist. However, he is probably best known for his findings in the field of entomology, the study of insects, and is considered by many to be the father of modern entomology. Much of his enduring popularity is due to his teaching ability and his manner of writing about the lives of insects in biographical form, which he preferred to a clinically detached, journalistic mode of recording. In doing so he combined what he called "my passion for scientific truth" with keen observations and an engaging, colloquial style of writing. Fabre (translated) wrote:

Others again have reproached me with my style, which has not the solemnity, nay, better, the dryness of the schools. They fear lest a page that is read without fatigue should not always be the expression of the truth. Were I to take their word for it, we are profound only on condition of being obscure.

The Mason Bees published in 1914

His Souvenirs Entomologiques is a series of texts on insects and arachnids. He influenced the later writings of Charles Darwin, who called Fabre "an inimitable observer". Fabre, however, was a Christian who remained sceptical about Darwin's theory of evolution, as he always held back from all theories and systems. His special force was exact and detailed observation, field research, always avoiding general conclusions from his observations, which he considered premature.

In one of Fabre's most famous experiments, he arranged pine processionary caterpillars to form a continuous loop around the edge of a pot. As each caterpillar instinctively followed the silken trail of the caterpillars in front of it, the group moved around in a circle for seven days. He further was able to forecast low atmospheric pressure events by observing the behaviours of the caterpillars.

He died on 11 October 1915. In the English speaking world, he became known through the extensive translations of his work by Alexander Teixeira de Mattos, carried out from 1912 to 1922.

== Works ==
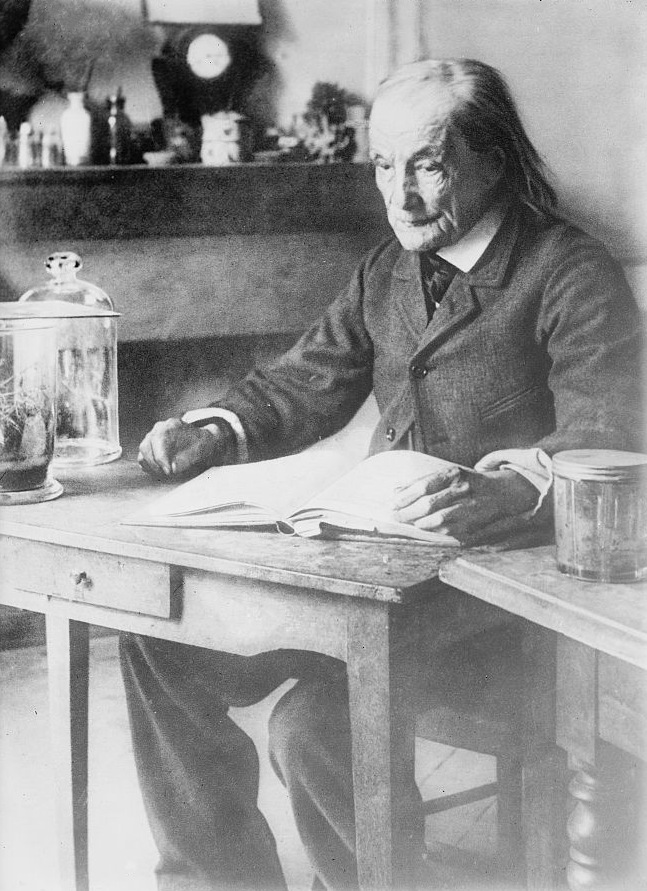
Fabre circa 1913

- Scène de la vie des insectes
- Chimie agricole (textbook) (1862)
- La Terre (1865)
- Le Ciel (textbook) (1867) – Scanned text on Gallica
- Le livre d'histoires, récits scientifiques de l'oncle Paul à ses neveux. Lectures courantes pour toutes les écoles (textbook) (1869) – High definition PDF file
- Catalogue des « Insectes Coléoptères observés aux environs d'Avignon » (1870)
- Les Ravageurs (1870)
- Les Auxiliaires, récits de l'oncle Paul sur les animaux utiles à l'agriculture (1873) High definition PDF file
- Aurore (textbook) (1874) Scanned text on Gallica
- Botanique (textbook) (1874)
- L'Industrie (textbook) (1875)
- Les Serviteurs (textbook) (1875)
- Sphériacées du Vaucluse (1878)
- Souvenirs entomologiques – 1st series (1879) – Scanned text on Gallica
- Etude sur les moeurs des Halictes (1879)
- Le Livre des Champs (1879)
- Lectures sur la Botanique (1881)
- Nouveaux souvenirs entomologiques – 2nd series (1882) – Scanned text on Gallica
- Lectures sur la Zoologie (1882)
- Zoologie (textbook) (1884)
- Souvenirs entomologiques – 3rd series (1886) – Scanned text on Gallica
- Histoire naturelles (textbook) (1889)
- Souvenirs entomologiques – 4th series (1891) – Scanned text on Gallica
- La plante : leçons à mon fils sur la botanique (livre scolaire) (1892) – Scanned text on Gallica
- Souvenirs entomologiques – 5th series (1897) – Scanned text on Gallica
- Souvenirs entomologiques – 6th series (1900) – Scanned text on Gallica
- Souvenirs entomologiques – 7th series (1901) – Scanned text on Gallica
- Souvenirs entomologiques – 8th series (1903)
- Souvenirs entomologiques – 9th series (1905)
- Souvenirs entomologiques – 10th series (1909)
- Fabre's Book of Insects retold from Alexander Teixeira de Mattos' translation of Fabre's Souvenirs entomologiques Scanned book
- Oubreto Provençalo dou Felibre di Tavan (1909) Text on Jean-Henri Fabre, e-museum
- La Vie des insectes (1910)
- Mœurs des insectes (1911)
- Les Merveilles de l'instinct chez les insectes (1913)
- Le monde merveilleux des insectes (1921)
- Poésie françaises et provençales (1925) (final edition)
- La Vie des araignées (1928)
- Bramble-Bees and Others Scanned book, Project Gutenberg full text
- The Life of the Grasshopper. Dodd, Mead, and company, 1917. ASIN B00085HYR4
- Insect Adventures. Dodd, Mead, 1917. Selections from Alexander Teixeira de Mattos' translation of Fabre's Souvenirs entomologiques, retold for young people.
- The Life of the Caterpillar. Dodd, Mead, 1919. ASIN B00089FB2A
- Field, Forest, and Farm: Things interesting to young nature lovers, including some matters of moment to gardeners and fruit-growers. The Century Company, 1919. ASIN B00085PDU4 Full text
- This Earth of Ours: Talks about Mountains and Rivers, Volcanoes, Earthquakes, and Geysers & Other Things. Albert & Charles Boni, 1923. ASIN B000EHLE22
- The Life of The Scorpion. University Press of the Pacific, 2002 (reprinted from the 1923 edition). ISBN 0-89875-842-4
- The Glow-Worm and Other Beetles. Dodd, Mead, 1919. ASIN B000882F2K
- The Mason Bees (Translated) Garden City, 1925. ASIN B00086XXU0; Reprinted in 2004 by Kessinger Publishing; ISBN 1-4179-1676-1; ISBN 978-1-4179-1676-4 Scanned book, Project Gutenberg full text
- Curiosities of Science. The Century Company, 1927. ASIN B00086KVBE
- The Insect World of J. Henri Fabre. Introduction and Interpretive Comments by Edwin Way Teale; foreword to 1991 edition by Gerald Durrell. Published by Dodd, Mead in 1949; Reprinted by Beacon Press in 1991; ISBN 0-8070-8513-8
- The Life of the Spider (1912) (Translated) preface by Maurice Maeterlinck Scanned book, Wikisource full text
- The Life of the Fly. (Translated) Fredonia Books, 2001. ISBN 1-58963-026-2; ISBN 978-1-58963-026-0 Scanned book
- The Hunting Wasps. University Press of the Pacific, 2002. ISBN 1-4102-0007-8; ISBN 978-1-4102-0007-5
- More Hunting Wasps Scanned book Project Gutenberg full text
- The Wonders of Instinct: Chapters in the Psychology of Insects. University Press of the Pacific, 2002. ISBN 0-89875-768-1; ISBN 978-0-89875-768-2 Scanned book, Project Gutenberg full text
- Social Life in the Insect World Scanned book, Project Gutenberg full text
- Insect life Scanned book

== Legacy ==
The site of his birth, at St Léons, near Millau is now the site of Micropolis, a tourist attraction dedicated to popularising entomology and a museum on his life.

His last home and office, the Harmas de Fabre in Provence is similarly a museum devoted to his life and work. His insect collection is preserved in the Musée Requien in Avignon.

The French post office commemorated Fabre in 1956 with a stamp depicting a portrait of him.

The 1951 biographical film Monsieur Fabre is devoted to his life.

Blood of the Mantis, a 2009 fantasy novel by the British author Adrian Tchaikovsky is dedicated to Fabre.

Fabre appears as the only major human character in a caper story parody set on his property in Matthew Bennardo's short story "The Famous Fabre Fly Caper".

== Biographies ==
- G.V. Legros, (Bernard Miall, translator), Fabre, Poet of Science. T. Fisher Unwin, 1913. (Reprinted by University Press of the Pacific, 2002, ISBN 0-89875-945-5; ISBN 978-0-89875-945-7) Scanned book
- E.L. Bouvier, "The Life and Work of J.H. Fabre". Annual Report of the Smithsonian Institution, 1916, pages 587–597.
- Augustin Fabre, The Life of Jean Henri Fabre. Dodd, Mead, 1921. Scanned version on the Internet Archive
- Percy F. Bicknell, The Human Side of Fabre. The Century Company, 1923.
- Eleanor Doorly, The Insect Man, William Heinemann, 1936
- Stephan Krall, Vom Leben und Sterben der Insekten. Die Welt des Jean-Henri Fabre, Hirzel, Stuttgart, 2023.
