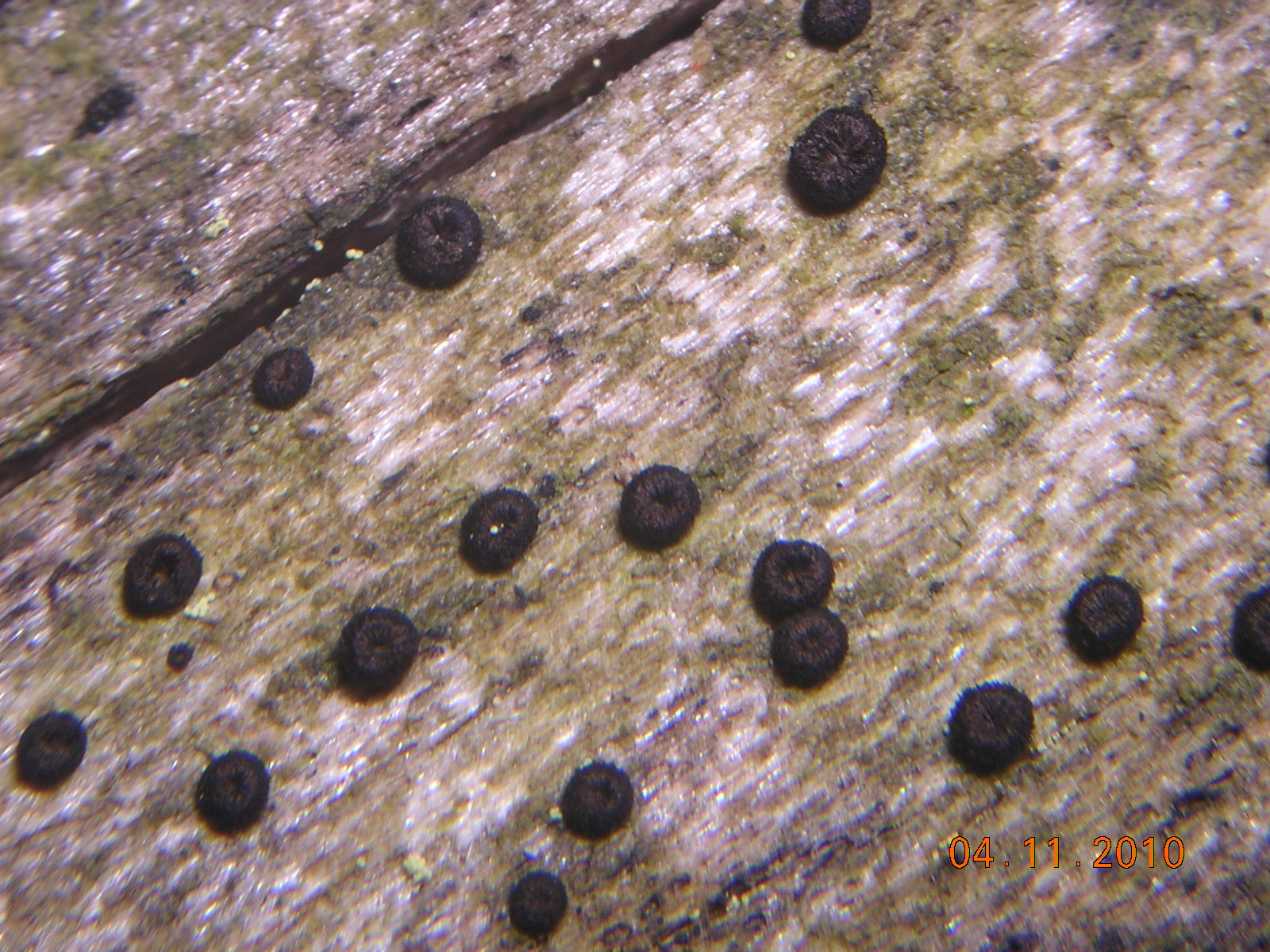
- Tubeufia roraimensis

Scientific classification
- Kingdom: Fungi
- Division: Ascomycota
- Class: Dothideomycetes
- Order: Tubeufiales
- Family: Tubeufiaceae; M.E.Barr (1979)

Type genus
- Tubeufia Penz. & Sacc. (1898)

= Tubeufiaceae =

Family of fungi

The Tubeufiaceae are a family of fungi in the order Tubeufiales of the class Dothideomycetes. The family was circumscribed in 1979 by mycologist Margaret Elizabeth Barr-Bigelow.

== Genera ==
- Acanthostigma
- Acanthophiobolus
- Acanthostigmella
- Allonecte
- Amphinectria
- Boerlagiomyces
- Byssocallis
- Chaetocrea
- Chaetosphaerulina
- Glaxoa
- Helicoma
- Letendraeopsis
- Lichenotubeufia Etayo (2017) – 8 spp.
- Malacaria
- Melioliphila
- Paranectriella
- Podonectria
- Puttemansia
- Rebentischia
- Taphrophila
- Thaxteriella
- Thaxteriellopsis
- Thaxterina
- Titea
- Tubeufia
- Uredinophila
