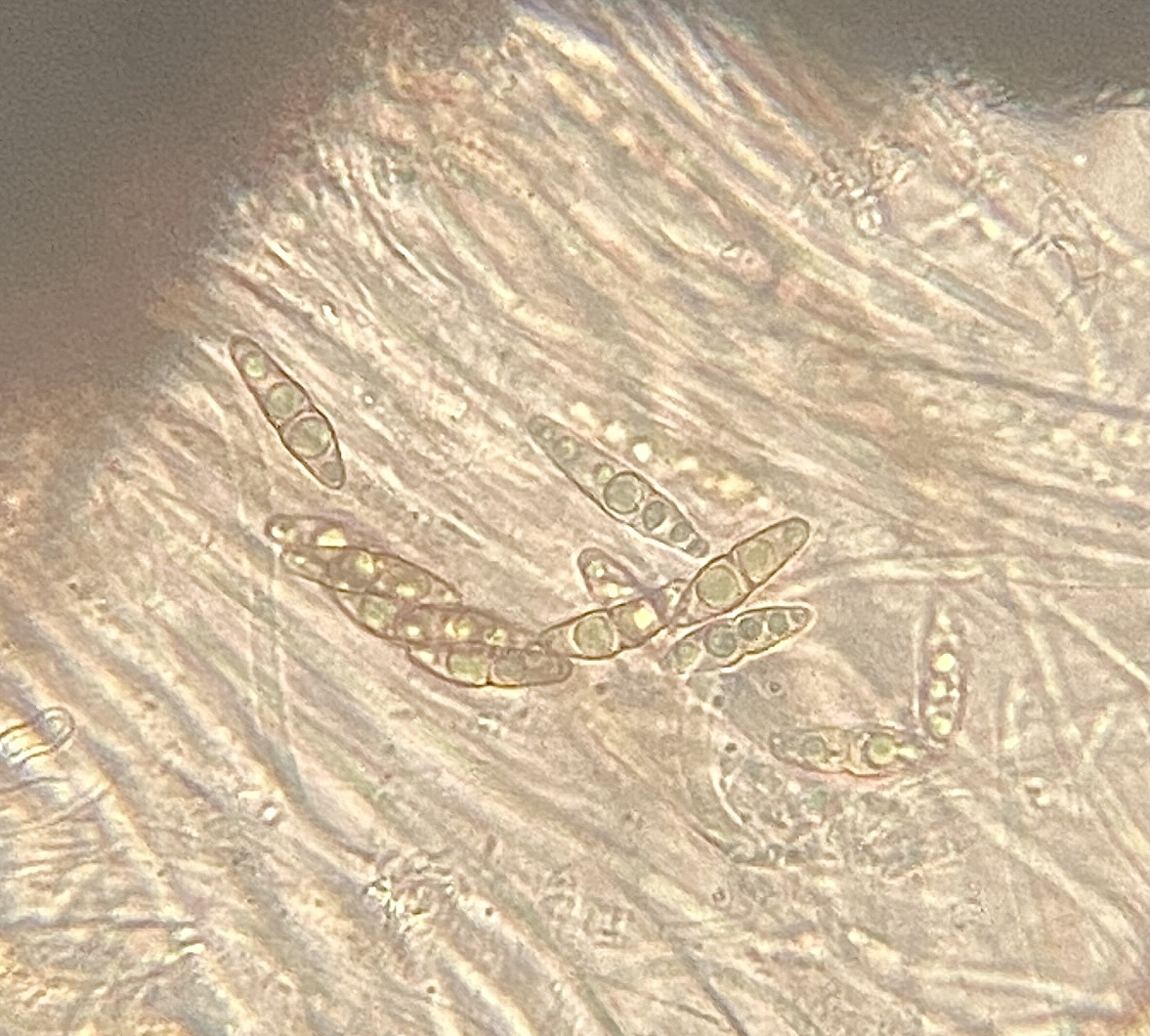
- Byssosphaeria rhodomphala

Scientific classification
- Kingdom: Fungi
- Division: Ascomycota
- Class: Dothideomycetes
- Order: Pleosporales
- Family: Melanommataceae; G.Winter (1885)

Type genus
- Melanomma Nitschke ex Fuckel (1870)

Genera
- See text

= Melanommataceae =

Family of fungi

The Melanommataceae are a family of fungi in the order Pleosporales. Taxa are widespread in temperate and subtropical regions, and are saprobic on wood and bark.

== Genera ==
These are the genera that are in the Melanommataceae (including estimated number of species in each genus, totalling 1017 species), according to a 2021 review of fungal classification. Following the genus name is the taxonomic authority (those who first circumscribed the genus; standardised author abbreviations are used), year of publication, and the estimated number of species.

- Alpinaria Jaklitsch & Voglmayr (2017) – 1 sp.
- Aposphaeria Sacc. (1880) – 189 spp.
- Asymmetricospora J.Fröhl. & K.D.Hyde (1998) – 1 sp.
- Bertiella (Sacc.) Sacc. (1899) – 2 spp.
- Bicrouania Kohlm. & Volkm.-Kohlm. (1990) – 1 sp.
- Byssosphaeria Cooke (1879) – 27 spp.
- Calyptronectria Speg. (1909) – 3 spp.
- Camposporium Harkn (1884) – 24 spp.
- Exosporiella P.Karst. (1892) – 1 sp.
- Fusiconidium Jun F.Li, Phook. & K.D.Hyde (2017) – 3 spp.
- Herpotrichia Fuckel (1868) – 101 spp.
- Mamillisphaeria K.D.Hyde, S.W.Wong & E.B.G.Jones (1996) – 1 sp.
- Marjia Wanas., Gafforov & K.D.Hyde (2018) – 1 sp.
- Melanocamarosporioides D.Pem, R.Jeewon, Gafforov & K.D.Hyde (2019) – 1 sp.
- Melanocamarosporium Wijayaw., Camporesi, Bhat & K.D.Hyde (2016) – 2 spp.
- Melanocucurbitaria Wanas., Gafforov & K.D.Hyde (2018) – 1 sp.
- Melanodiplodia Wanas., Gafforov & K.D.Hyde (2018) – 1 sp.
- Melanomma Nitschke ex Fuckel (1870) – ca. 30 spp.
- Monoseptella Wanas., Gafforov & K.D.Hyde (2018) – 1 sp.
- Muriformistrickeria Q.Tian, Wanas., Camporesi & K.D.Hyde (2015) – 2 spp.
- Navicella Fabre (1879) – 5 spp.
- Neobyssosphaeria Wanas., E.B.G.Jones & K.D.Hyde (2020) – 1 sp.
- Petrakia Syd. & P.Syd. (1913) – 6 spp.
- Phragmotrichum Kunze (1923) – 5 spp.
- Pleotrichocladium Hern.-Restr., R.F.Castañeda & Gené (2017) – 1 sp.
- Praetumpfia Jaklitsch & Voglmayr (2017) – 1 sp.
- Pseudobyssosphaeria H.B.Jiang & K.D.Hyde (2018) – 1 sp.
- Pseudodidymella C.Z.Wei, Y.Harada & Katum. (1997) – 2 spp.
- Pseudostrickeria Q.Tian, Wanas., Camporesi & K.D.Hyde (2015) – 3 spp.
- Sarimanas M.Matsum., K.Hiray. & Kaz.Tanaka (2015) – 2 spp.
- Seifertia Partr. & Morgan-Jones (2002) – 2 spp.
- Tumularia Descals & Marvanová (1987) – 2 spp.
- Uzbekistanica Wanas., Gafforov & K.D.Hyde (2018) – 3 spp.
- Xenostigmina Crous (1998) – 2 spp.
