= List of Aecidium species =

This is a list of the fungus species in the genus Aecidium. Many are plant pathogens as rusts.

As of 27 August 2023, the GBIF lists up to 947 species, while Species Fungorum lists about 815 species (out of 1251 records). About 800 species are accepted by Wijayawardene et al. 2020.

This list of name, authority and dates is based on the Species Fungorum list.

== A ==
- Aecidium abietis-mariesii Sawada (1950)
- Aecidium abscedens Arthur (1915)
- Aecidium acalyphae Henn. (1907)
- Aecidium acalyphae-ciliatae P.B. Chavan (1969)
- Aecidium acanthocarpi J. Walker & van der Merwe (2009)
- Aecidium acanthopanacis Dietel (1905)
- Aecidium achyrophori Plats (1983)
- Aecidium aconiti-anthorae Săvul. (1953)
- Aecidium aconiti-paniculati E. Fisch. (1904)
- Aecidium aconiti-phragmitincolae Azbukina (1972)
- Aecidium actinidiae Syd. & P. Syd. (1909)
- Aecidium adenariae Mayor (1914)
- Aecidium adenophorae Jacz. (1900)
- Aecidium adenophorae-verticillatae Syd. & P. Syd. (1917)
- Aecidium adenostylis Syd. & P. Syd. (1901)
- Aecidium adhatodae Syd. & P. Syd. (1906)
- Aecidium adhatodicola G.F. Laundon (1963)
- Aecidium advectitium Cummins (1940)
- Aecidium aechmantherae Syd. & P. Syd. (1907)
- Aecidium ageratinae Savile (1973)
- Aecidium aikeni Syd. & P. Syd. (1903)
- Aecidium ailanthi J.Y. Zhuang (1990)
- Aecidium ajugae Syd. & P. Syd. (1907)
- Aecidium akebiae Henn. (1900)
- Aecidium alangii Hirats. f. & Yoshin. (1935)
- Aecidium alaskanum Trel. (1904)
- Aecidium alaterni Maire (1900)
- Aecidium albicans Arthur & Holw. (1918)
- Aecidium albiceratum Cummins (1941)
- Aecidium alchorneae Sacc. (1916)
- Aecidium alchorneae-rugosae Gjaerum & D.A. Reid (1983)
- Aecidium alibertiae Arthur (1922)
- Aecidium alternantherae H.S. Jacks. & Holw. (1927)
- Aecidium amagense Mayor (1914)
- Aecidium amaryllidis Syd., P. Syd. & E.J. Butler (1912)
- Aecidium amazonense Henn. (1904)
- Aecidium ampliatum H.S. Jacks. & Holw. (1918)
- Aecidium anaphalidis-leptophyllae T.S. Ramakr., Sriniv. & Sundaram (1952)
- Aecidium anceps Syd. & P. Syd. (1901)
- Aecidium ancundense Speg. (1918)
- Aecidium ancylanthi Henn. (1903)
- Aecidium andicola Jørst. (1959)
- Aecidium anemarrhenae Z.H. Zhou & Z. Liu (1982)
- Aecidium anemones-silvestris Kleb. (1914)
- Aecidium anningense F.L. Tai (1947)
- Aecidium anograe Arthur (1901)
- Aecidium antherici Henn. & Pole-Evans (1908)
- Aecidium anthericicola Arthur (1918)
- Aecidium antholyzae Bubák (1911)
- Aecidium aphelandrae Henn. (1905)
- Aecidium aposeridis Namysł. (1911)
- Aecidium approximans J.C. Lindq. (1952)
- Aecidium archibaccharidis Cummins (1941)
- Aecidium arctoum Arthur (1920)
- Aecidium arcularium Arthur (1920)
- Aecidium arenariae Vestergr. (1909)
- Aecidium argyreiae-involucratae P.B. Chavan (1969)
- Aecidium argythamniae Arthur (1906)
- Aecidium aristolochiicola Marchal & Steyaert (1929)
- Aecidium artabotrydis Thaung (1977)
- Aecidium asarifolium Z. Urb. (1990)
- Aecidium asparagacearum Const. (1920)
- Aecidium asperulae-ciliatae Săvul. (1939)
- Aecidium asphodeli-microcarpi Gonz. Frag. (1913)
- Aecidium aspiliae Gjaerum (1986)
- Aecidium astrochlaenae Wakef. & Hansf. (1949)
- Aecidium atroalbum Henn. (1903)
- Aecidium atrocrustaceum Syd. & P. Syd. (1921)
- Aecidium avocense Cummins & H.C. Greene (1954)

== B ==
- Aecidium baccharidophilum Speg. (1903)
- Aecidium baileyanum P. Syd. & Syd. (1923)
- Aecidium balearicum Gonz. Frag. ex Sacc. & Trotter (1925)
- Aecidium banaticum Bubák (1936)
- Aecidium banketense Hopk. (1938)
- Aecidium banosense Syd. & P. Syd. (1913)
- Aecidium barclayi Sacc. & Trotter (1912)
- Aecidium barleriae Doidge (1948)
- Aecidium barnadesiae Jørst. (1956)
- Aecidium batesianum Barthol. (1904)
- Aecidium batesii Arthur (1920)
- Aecidium batrachii Katajev (1951)
- Aecidium baumianum Henn. (1903)
- Aecidium begoniae Berndt (1998)
- Aecidium belladonnae H.K.G. Paul & Poelt (1950)
- Aecidium bellidis-silvestris Sacc. (1915)
- Aecidium berberidis-ruscifoliae Henn. (1902)
- Aecidium berberidis-thunbergii Henn. (1905)
- Aecidium berkleyae Henn. & Pole-Evans (1908)
- Aecidium bertonii Speg. (1918)
- Aecidium berulae Bubák (1902)
- Aecidium bethelii Arthur (1920)
- Aecidium biscutellae Noelli (1902)
- Aecidium blepharidis Har. & Pat. (1909)
- Aecidium bocconiae Mayor (1914)
- Aecidium boehmeriae Arthur (1907)
- Aecidium bogotense Mayor (1914)
- Aecidium boltoniae Arthur (1901)
- Aecidium bomareae Mayor (1914)
- Aecidium bomolense Syd. & P. Syd. (1904)
- Aecidium borreriae Pat. (1903)
- Aecidium borreriicola H.S. Jacks. & Holw. (1932)
- Aecidium borrichiae Syd. & P. Syd. (1901)
- Aecidium bossiaeae Henn. (1901)
- Aecidium bothriospermi Henn. (1905)
- Aecidium bourreriae Holw. (1919)
- Aecidium brachycomes Petr. (1953)
- Aecidium brassicae Trab. (1907)
- Aecidium breyniae Syd. & P. Syd. (1907)
- Aecidium brideliae Henn. & Pole-Evans (1908)
- Aecidium brideliae-micranthae Cummins (1941)
- Aecidium brumptianum Pat. & Har. (1905)
- Aecidium bubakii Gonz. Frag. (1914)
- Aecidium buddlejae Speg. (1925)
- Aecidium bulbines Henn. & Pole-Evans (1908)
- Aecidium bupleuri-sachalinensis T. Miyake (1906)
- Aecidium burtt-davyi Doidge (1939)
- Aecidium busseanum Henn. (1904)
- Aecidium butleri Jørst. & S.H. Iqbal (1967)
- Aecidium bylianum Syd. (1924)
- Aecidium byrsonimae Henn. (1895)

== C ==
- Aecidium cacciniae Faizieva (1986)
- Aecidium cajani Petch (1909)
- Aecidium caladii Schwein. (1822)
- Aecidium callianthemi Murashk. (1928)
- Aecidium callianthum Syd. (1935)
- Aecidium callicarpicola J.Y. Zhuang (1990)
- Aecidium callistephi I. Miyake (1914)
- Aecidium callixenis Berk. ex P. Syd. & Syd. (1924)
- Aecidium calotheum Syd. (1930)
- Aecidium campanulastri G.W. Wilson (1911)
- Aecidium campylotropidis F.L. Tai (1947)
- Aecidium cannabis Szembel (1927)
- Aecidium cannonii Griffiths (1907)
- Aecidium cantense Arthur (1929)
- Aecidium capparis Sagdull. (1986)
- Aecidium carbonaceum W.T. Dale (1955)
- Aecidium cardiandrae Dietel (1903)
- Aecidium cardiospermophilum Speg. (1909)
- Aecidium carotinum Bubák (1902)
- Aecidium carpochaetes Syd. & P. Syd. (1903)
- Aecidium carviae Sathe (1966)
- Aecidium caspicum Jacz. (1900)
- Aecidium cassiae-pumilae P.B. Chavan (1969)
- Aecidium cassiae-torae P.B. Chavan & Bakare (1973)
- Aecidium caulicola Kellerm. (1903)
- Aecidium celmisiae Rodway (1925)
- Aecidium celmisiae-discoloris G. Cunn. (1924)
- Aecidium celmisiae-petiolatae G. Cunn. (1924)
- Aecidium celmisiae-petriei G. Cunn. (1924)
- Aecidium celosiae Jørst. (1957)
- Aecidium cephalanthi-peruviani Henn. (1904)
- Aecidium cephalariae Syd. & P. Syd. (1912)
- Aecidium cerrense Henn. (1904)
- Aecidium chamaecristae Arthur (1919)
- Aecidium charantiae Mayor & Vienn.-Bourg. (1951)
- Aecidium chlorophyti Har. & Pat. (1909)
- Aecidium chlorophyti-glauci P.B. Chavan (1969)
- Aecidium chrysanthemi-chanetii T.Z. Liu & J.Y. Zhuang (2018)
- Aecidium chrysanthum Syd. & P. Syd. (1916)
- Aecidium chrysophaeum Syd. (1939)
- Aecidium chuquiraguae H.S. Jacks. & Holw. (1932)
- Aecidium cinnamomi Racib. (1900)
- Aecidium cissicola Cant. (1949)
- Aecidium clarum Syd. & P. Syd. (1912)
- Aecidium clematidis-brachiatae Doidge (1927)
- Aecidium clematidis-songaricae Nevod. (1950)
- Aecidium clemensiae Arthur (1919)
- Aecidium cleomes Ellis & H.W. Anderson (1891)
- Aecidium clerodendricola Henn. (1903)
- Aecidium clerodendri-fragrantis J.M. Yen (1970)
- Aecidium clerodendri-serrati J.Y. Zhuang (1986)
- Aecidium clibadii Syd. & P. Syd. (1903)
- Aecidium clutiae Doidge (1927)
- Aecidium cockerellii Arthur (1916)
- Aecidium colchici S. Ahmad (1956)
- Aecidium colchici-aurei Ulbr. (1938)
- Aecidium colchici-autumnalis Vienn.-Bourg. (1982)
- Aecidium collapsum Mains (1939)
- Aecidium congoanum Henn. (1907)
- Aecidium consolidae Katajev (1951)
- Aecidium conspersum Davis (1942)
- Aecidium conspicuum Arthur (1918)
- Aecidium conyzae-auriculiferae Jørst. (1957)
- Aecidium conyzae-colombiense Pardo-Card. (2000)
- Aecidium conyzae-pinnatilobatae P. Syd. & Syd. (1923)
- Aecidium conyzicola L.L. Duarte & R.W. Barreto (2016)
- Aecidium cordiiphilum Speg. (1925)
- Aecidium cornu-cervi Henn. (1904)
- Aecidium coronillae Woron. (1922)
- Aecidium corycii Doidge (1927)
- Aecidium cosmostigmae C. Mohanan (2010)
- Aecidium coutareae F. Kern & Thurst. (1944)
- Aecidium crambes Moesz (1940)
- Aecidium crassocephali Wakef. & Hansf. (1949)
- Aecidium cratevae Syd. & P. Syd. (1906)
- Aecidium crepidis-incarnatae Syd. & P. Syd. (1901)
- Aecidium cryptotaeniae Dietel (1900)
- Aecidium culcitii Jørst. (1956)
- Aecidium cumingii Syd. (1931)
- Aecidium cuspidatum T.S. Ramakr., Sriniv. & Sundaram (1953)
- Aecidium cuvierae J.M. Yen & Gilles (1976)
- Aecidium cyananthi J.Y. Zhuang (1995)
- Aecidium cymbariae T.Z. Liu & J.Y. Zhuang (2018)
- Aecidium cynanchi Cummins (1941)
- Aecidium cyrillae Arthur (1918)
- Aecidium cyttarioides Henn. (1904)

== D ==
- Aecidium dahliae Syd. & P. Syd. (1921)
- Aecidium dahliae-maxonii Cummins (1943)
- Aecidium dakotense Griffiths (1902)
- Aecidium dalechampiicola Henn. (1904)
- Aecidium dallasicum Petr. (1954)
- Aecidium dapsile Arthur & Cummins (1937)
- Aecidium daturae F. Kern & Thurst. (1934)
- Aecidium davyi Syd. & P. Syd. (1912)
- Aecidium deckerae Pat. (1909)
- Aecidium delicatum Arthur (1922)
- Aecidium delphinii Barthol. (1902)
- Aecidium delphinii-consolidae Hollós (1926)
- Aecidium denekiae Doidge (1927)
- Aecidium diclipterae J.M. Yen (1972)
- Aecidium dielsii Henn. (1902)
- Aecidium dinteri Doidge (1939)
- Aecidium diospyri-hispidae Viégas (1945)
- Aecidium dipcadi Har. & Pat. (1909)
- Aecidium dipcadi-viridis Doidge (1948)
- Aecidium dirichletiae Jørst. (1957)
- Aecidium disciforme McAlpine (1906)
- Aecidium discopodii Gjaerum (2002)
- Aecidium dispersum Dietel (1914)
- Aecidium distinctum Arthur & Cummins (1933)
- Aecidium diversum J.C. Lindq. (1966)
- Aecidium doemiae Har. & Pat. (1909)
- Aecidium doidgeae Syd. & P. Syd. (1912)
- Aecidium domingense F. Kern & Cif. (1930)
- Aecidium dominicanum Gonz. Frag. & Cif. (1926)
- Aecidium doronici-caucasici Magnus ex P. Syd. & Syd. (1923)
- Aecidium dorsteniae-holstii Henn. (1905)
- Aecidium dorsteniae-walleri Cant. (1949)
- Aecidium dubiosum Syd. & P. Syd. (1901)
- Aecidium dubitabile J.C. Lindq. (1953)
- Aecidium dunaliae J.C. Lindq. (1953)
- Aecidium dyschoristes Cummins (1960)

== E ==
- Aecidium echuyaense Gjaerum (1986)
- Aecidium eichelbaumii Henn. (1905)
- Aecidium elaeagni-umbellatae Dietel (1905)
- Aecidium elaeocarpi Racib. (1909)
- Aecidium elaeocarpicola Cummins (1941)
- Aecidium elaeocarpi-tuberculati Hosag. (1984)
- Aecidium elbursense Petr. (1940)
- Aecidium emiliae Petch (1917)
- Aecidium eminii Zaprom. (1928)
- Aecidium enceliae Arthur (1918)
- Aecidium endophylloides Liou (1929)
- Aecidium endressiae Mayor (1971)
- Aecidium enkianthi Dietel (1903)
- Aecidium entebbense Cummins (1945)
- Aecidium enydrae J.M. Yen & Gilles (1976)
- Aecidium eremostachydis Petr. (1968)
- Aecidium erigerontis F. Kern & Whetzel (1930)
- Aecidium eritrichi Henn. (1902)
- Aecidium erodii-cicutarii Const. (1920)
- Aecidium ervatamiae J.M. Yen (1977)
- Aecidium espinosae Syd. (1932)
- Aecidium euodiae J.Y. Zhuang (1990)
- Aecidium eupatorii-rotundifolii Savile (1973)
- Aecidium euphorbiae-gerardianae E. Fisch. (1904)
- Aecidium euphorbiae-pallasii Tranzschel (1939)
- Aecidium evansii Henn. (1908)

== F ==
- Aecidium falcatae Arthur (1906)
- Aecidium farameae Arthur (1915)
- Aecidium fatsiae Syd. & P. Syd. (1913)
- Aecidium favaceum Arthur (1915)
- Aecidium fluggeae Doidge (1927)
- Aecidium fluxum Arthur (1907)
- Aecidium foederatum Cummins (1940)
- Aecidium foetidum Dietel (1900)
- Aecidium fraserae Trel. (1904)
- Aecidium fraxini-bungeanae Dietel (1903)
- Aecidium fuchsiae H.S. Jacks. & Holw. (1932)
- Aecidium fuchsiicola Speg. (1925)

== G ==
- Aecidium gaeumannii E. Fisch. (1937)
- Aecidium gageae Trotter (1916)
- Aecidium galasiae Syd. & P. Syd. (1903)
- Aecidium garciniae Sundaram & A.V. Rao (1957)
- Aecidium gardeniae Kavale & M.S. Patil (2008)
- Aecidium gaubae Petr. (1953)
- Aecidium geniospori Wakef. & Hansf. (1949)
- Aecidium ghesquierei Hendr. (1948)
- Aecidium girardiniae Syd. & P. Syd. (1906)
- Aecidium glechonis Speg. (1912)
- Aecidium globosum Farl. (1905)
- Aecidium glycines Henn. (1895)
- Aecidium goetzeanum Henn. (1900)
- Aecidium gomphocarpi Cummins (1960)
- Aecidium gomphostigmae Doidge (1927)
- Aecidium grindeliae Syd. & P. Syd. (1901)
- Aecidium guadalajarae Syd. & P. Syd. (1902)
- Aecidium guareae Henn. (1904)
- Aecidium guatemalense F. Kern & Kellerm. (1907)
- Aecidium gymnematis T.S. Ramakr. & Sundaram (1955)
- Aecidium gymnolomiae Mayor (1914)
- Aecidium gynurae Petch (1912)
- Aecidium gynurae-cernuae Vienn.-Bourg. (1955)

== H ==
- Aecidium halophilum (Speg.) Speg. (1925)
- Aecidium haplocarphae Gjaerum (1986)
- Aecidium haqii Sultan, Khalid & Mukhtar (2008)
- Aecidium hebes G. Cunn. (1928)
- Aecidium hecatactidis Cummins (1940)
- Aecidium hederae Wakef. (1931)
- Aecidium hedyotidis Syd. (1914)
- Aecidium hedypnoidis Pat. (1906)
- Aecidium helianthellae Arthur (1902)
- Aecidium helichrysi Doidge (1927)
- Aecidium heliopsidis Mayor (1914)
- Aecidium heliotropiicola P.H.B. Talbot (1948)
- Aecidium helosciadii Har. (1900)
- Aecidium hemidesmi Syd. & P. Syd. (1912)
- Aecidium hemigraphidis B.V. Patil & Thirum. (1972)
- Aecidium henoniae Vienn.-Bourg. (1963)
- Aecidium herniariae Scalia (1901)
- Aecidium herrerianum Arthur (1906)
- Aecidium hesleri Arthur (1933)
- Aecidium heterothalami Jørst. (1956)
- Aecidium hexalobi Har. & Pat. (1909)
- Aecidium hibisci-surattensis Mayor & Vienn.-Bourg. (1951)
- Aecidium hippeastri Gäum. (1936)
- Aecidium hispaniolae F. Kern, Cif. & Thurst. (1933)
- Aecidium hoffmannii P. Syd. & Syd. (1923)
- Aecidium holboelliae Y.C. Wang & J.Y. Zhuang (1983)
- Aecidium holwayi H.S. Jacks. (1932)
- Aecidium hostae Dietel (1905)
- Aecidium huallagense Henn. (1904)
- Aecidium humuli Hotson (1925)
- Aecidium hupiro G. Cunn. (1924)
- Aecidium hydrangeae-paniculatae Dietel (1903)
- Aecidium hydrangeicola Henn. (1900)
- Aecidium hydrocotylinum Speg. (1909)
- Aecidium hymenocallidis F. Kern & Thurst. (1944)
- Aecidium hypoestis-triflorae Gjaerum (2003)
- Aecidium hypseocharidicola Berndt (2002)
- Aecidium hypseocharidis J.C. Lindq. (1953)
- Aecidium hypsophilum Speg. (1909)

== I ==
- Aecidium ilicosense Syd. (1931)
- Aecidium impatientis-capensis Doidge (1927)
- Aecidium incertum Syd. & P. Syd. (1901)
- Aecidium incomparabile Syd. & P. Syd. (1909)
- Aecidium incrassatum Syd. & P. Syd. (1915)
- Aecidium incurvum Tracy & Earle (1901)
- Aecidium indecisum Arthur (1920)
- Aecidium innatum Syd., P. Syd. & E.J. Butler (1912)
- Aecidium innuptum Cummins (1941)
- Aecidium inouyei Henn. (1902)
- Aecidium insulsum Arthur (1924)
- Aecidium inulae-grandis Nevod. (1950)
- Aecidium inulae-helenii Const. (1904)
- Aecidium ipomoeiphilum Speg. (1922)
- Aecidium iquitosense Henn. (1904)
- Aecidium iranicum Petr. & I. Lohwag (1974)
- Aecidium iresines Jørst. (1956)
- Aecidium isoglossae Syd. & P. Syd. (1903)
- Aecidium isolonae Gjaerum & D.A. Reid (1987)
- Aecidium ivae H.S. Jacks. (1918)
- Aecidium iwatense Dietel (1905)
- Aecidium ixorae Arthur (1920)

== J ==
- Aecidium jacquemontiae Ellis & Everh. (1902)
- Aecidium jatrophicola J.C. Lindq. (1953)
- Aecidium jujuyense J.C. Lindq. (1954)
- Aecidium jurisicii Bubák (1936)
- Aecidium juruense Henn. (1904)
- Aecidium justiciae Henn. (1907)
- Aecidium justiciae-exiguae Gjaerum (2003)

== K ==
- Aecidium kakelense Henn. (1903)
- Aecidium kalanchoes J.R. Hern. (2004)
- Aecidium kamalii R.K. Verma (2002)
- Aecidium kamatii Sathe (1966)
- Aecidium keerliae Arthur (1918)
- Aecidium kiehlianum Viégas (1945)
- Aecidium kisantense Henn. (1907)
- Aecidium kondoriense Kuprev. (1950)
- Aecidium kowhai G. Cunn. (1924)
- Aecidium kraussiae P. Syd. & Syd. (1923)
- Aecidium kuepferi Mayor (1972)
- Aecidium kuntzii-friderici Magnus (1908)

== L ==
- Aecidium lactucae-debilis P. Syd. & Syd. (1923)
- Aecidium lactucinum Lagerh. & Lindr. (1901)
- Aecidium lagunense Syd. & P. Syd. (1913)
- Aecidium lantanae Mayor (1914)
- Aecidium laporteae Henn. (1905)
- Aecidium lapsanicola Tranzschel (1904)
- Aecidium laserpitii-sileris Maire ex Sacc. & Trotter (1912)
- Aecidium leeae M.A. Salam & Ramachar (1955)
- Aecidium leeanum Syd. (1923)
- Aecidium leiocarpum Syd. & P. Syd. (1917)
- Aecidium leonense Cummins (1941)
- Aecidium leontices Tranzschel (1901)
- Aecidium lepidagathidis-cristatae P.B. Chavan (1969)
- Aecidium lepidagathidis-cuspidatae P.B. Chavan (1969)
- Aecidium lepidagathis Syd. & P. Syd. (1907)
- Aecidium leporinum Arthur (1910)
- Aecidium leptotaeniae Lindr. (1901)
- Aecidium le-testuarum Cant. (1949)
- Aecidium leucadinum Mitter (1935)
- Aecidium leucadis-montanae P.B. Chavan (1969)
- Aecidium leucostictum (Berk. & M.A. Curtis) Sacc. (1888)
- Aecidium liabi Mayor (1913)
- Aecidium libanoticum Magnus (1911)
- Aecidium libertum Arthur (1910)
- Aecidium ligustricola Cummins (1951)
- Aecidium lilii-cordifolii Dietel (1903)
- Aecidium lindavianum P. Syd. & Syd. (1923)
- Aecidium lini Dearn. & House (1915)
- Aecidium lippiae-sidoidis Syd. & P. Syd. (1902)
- Aecidium lipskianum Jacz. (1900)
- Aecidium litakunense Doidge (1939)
- Aecidium litseae-populifoliae J.Y. Zhuang (1990)
- Aecidium lobbii Syd. (1931)
- Aecidium longaense Henn. (1903)
- Aecidium lophanthi Henn. (1900)
- Aecidium lophopetali Wakef. (1931)
- Aecidium loranthinum (Pass.) Canonaco (1936)
- Aecidium luvungae C. Mohanan (2010)
- Aecidium lycianthis Cummins (1943)
- Aecidium lycii Arthur (1924)
- Aecidium lysichiti Jørst. (1934)
- Aecidium lysimachiae-japonicae Dietel (1905)

== M ==
- Aecidium mabeae Thurst. (1940)
- Aecidium macedonicum Syd. & P. Syd. (1921)
- Aecidium macroclinidii Henn. & Shirai (1900)
- Aecidium macrodontae G. Cunn. (1924)
- Aecidium magnipycnium Cummins (1943)
- Aecidium malvicola Arthur (1904)
- Aecidium manettiae F. Kern & Whetzel (1930)
- Aecidium mangaranga Henn. (1903)
- Aecidium manilense Arthur & Cummins (1937)
- Aecidium maprouneae Henn. (1904)
- Aecidium mararyense Henn. (1904)
- Aecidium marcii Bubák (1903)
- Aecidium margarettae Cummins (1952)
- Aecidium margaritariae Sotão & Piovezan (2021)
- Aecidium margueryanum Maire (1900)
- Aecidium mariani-raciborskii Siemaszko (1933)
- Aecidium marsdeniae Syd. (1937)
- Aecidium matapense Cummins (1941)
- Aecidium maublancii Syd. & P. Syd. (1904)
- Aecidium mayorii E. Fisch. (1902)
- Aecidium medellinense Mayor (1914)
- Aecidium melaenum Syd. & P. Syd. (1921)
- Aecidium melaleucum Syd. & P. Syd. (1917)
- Aecidium melananthi Henn. (1902)
- Aecidium melanotes Syd. & P. Syd. (1903)
- Aecidium meliosmae Dietel (1900)
- Aecidium meliosmae-pungentis Henn. & Shirai (1900)
- Aecidium meliosmae-wightii T.S. Ramakr., Sriniv. & Sundaram (1952)
- Aecidium mellerae Gjaerum (2005)
- Aecidium memecyli Thirum. (1947)
- Aecidium menyharthii Henn. (1906)
- Aecidium merenderae Syd. & P. Syd. (1906)
- Aecidium mertensiae Arthur (1904)
- Aecidium mesadeniae Arthur (1920)
- Aecidium metaplexis Y.C. Wang & B. Li (1983)
- Aecidium micranthum Syd. & P. Syd. (1915)
- Aecidium micrococcae Syd. (1938)
- Aecidium microglossae Vienn.-Bourg. (1955)
- Aecidium microglossicola Jørst. (1957)
- Aecidium microrhynchi Henn. (1900)
- Aecidium microstomum Berk. (1872)
- Aecidium millae H.S. Jacks. & Holw. (1926)
- Aecidium millefolii Nevod. (1950)
- Aecidium milleri G. Cunn. (1924)
- Aecidium minimum H.S. Jacks. & Holw. (1932)
- Aecidium minoense Syd. & P. Syd. (1915)
- Aecidium minutulum H.S. Jacks. ex Barthol. (1926)
- Aecidium miryense Henn. (1904)
- Aecidium mitellae Ellis & Everh. ex Arthur (1920)
- Aecidium mitoense Cummins (1945)
- Aecidium mitracarpi Syd. & P. Syd. (1912)
- Aecidium modestum Arthur (1919)
- Aecidium moggii Doidge (1939)
- Aecidium molluginis Wurth (1905)
- Aecidium monocystis Berk. (1855)
- Aecidium montagnei Gonz. Frag. (1914)
- Aecidium montanum E.J. Butler (1905)
- Aecidium monticolae F. Kern, Thurst. & Whetzel (1934)
- Aecidium moricola Henn. (1902)
- Aecidium morobeanum Cummins (1941)
- Aecidium morobense Cummins (1943)
- Aecidium moschosmatis Henn. (1901)
- Aecidium mozinnae Arthur (1918)
- Aecidium muehlenbeckiae H.S. Jacks. & Holw. (1927)
- Aecidium muelleri Thurst. (1940)
- Aecidium multisorum Cummins (1960)
- Aecidium mundulum H.S. Jacks. & Holw. (1932)
- Aecidium musashiense Syd. & P. Syd. (1917)
- Aecidium mutum Arthur (1924)
- Aecidium myopori G. Cunn. (1924)
- Aecidium myrsines McNabb (1962)

== N ==
- Aecidium nakanishikii Henn. (1905)
- Aecidium nanocnides Dietel (1905)
- Aecidium narcissi Liou (1929)
- Aecidium navarinum Jørst. (1957)
- Aecidium nectandrae H.S. Jacks. & Holw. (1931)
- Aecidium neolitseae Y.C. Wang & J.Y. Zhuang (1983)
- Aecidium nestlerae Doidge (1948)
- Aecidium nidorellae Doidge (1927)
- Aecidium nigrocinctum Pat. & Har. (1906)
- Aecidium niitakense Hirats. (1938)
- Aecidium nikkense Henn. & Shirai (1900)
- Aecidium nobile Syd. & P. Syd. (1906)

== O ==
- Aecidium obesum Arthur (1910)
- Aecidium obsoletum Speg. (1925)
- Aecidium occidentale Arthur (1904)
- Aecidium ocfemianum H.S. Jacks. & Holw. (1931)
- Aecidium oleariae McAlpine (1906)
- Aecidium onosmodii Arthur (1904)
- Aecidium ophiocauli Henn. (1907)
- Aecidium origani Jørst. (1922)
- Aecidium orobi Pers. (1794)
- Aecidium osmanthi Syd., P. Syd. & E.J. Butler (1907)
- Aecidium otira G. Cunn. (1928)
- Aecidium oxygoni anonaco (1936)

== P ==
- Aecidium pachycarpum P. Syd. & Syd. (1923)
- Aecidium pachystigmae Doidge (1927)
- Aecidium painavuense Hosag. (1987)
- Aecidium pakistanicum Sultan, I.U. Haq, Khalid & Mukhtar (2008)
- Aecidium papuanum Cummins (1941)
- Aecidium papuasicum Cummins (1943)
- Aecidium papudense H.S. Jacks. & Holw. (1932)
- Aecidium paramense Mayor (1914)
- Aecidium paramignyae Racib. (1909)
- Aecidium parile Syd. & P. Syd. (1914)
- Aecidium parkiae Boedijn (1960)
- Aecidium parsonsiae Petch (1909)
- Aecidium parthenii Pat. & Har. (1905)
- Aecidium pascheri Bubák (1909)
- Aecidium passiflorae Henn. (1904)
- Aecidium passifloricola Henn. (1904)
- Aecidium patriniae Henn. (1902)
- Aecidium pavoniae-odoratae T.S. Ramakr., Sriniv. & Sundaram (1952)
- Aecidium pectinis-veneris Kirgizb. (1986)
- Aecidium pentziae-globosae Doidge (1948)
- Aecidium peracarpae Dietel (1922)
- Aecidium pereskiae H.S. Jacks. & Holw. (1931)
- Aecidium pereziae Arthur (1918)
- Aecidium pergulariae Maubl. (1905)
- Aecidium peristrophes Syd. & P. Syd. (1912)
- Aecidium perkinsiae Henn. (1901)
- Aecidium permultum Syd. & P. Syd. (1912)
- Aecidium perralderianum Maire ex Sacc. & Trotter (1925)
- Aecidium petalostemonis Kellerm. & Carleton (1907)
- Aecidium petchii Sacc. & Trotter (1912)
- Aecidium petroselini-sativi Săvul. (1939)
- Aecidium peucedani-raiblensis Maire ex Sacc. & Trotter (1912)
- Aecidium phacae Jørst. (1934)
- Aecidium phaylopsidis Cummins (1960)
- Aecidium philadelphi Dietel (1914)
- Aecidium philippianum M. Scholler (2010)
- Aecidium philippii Speg. (1924)
- Aecidium phlogacanthi Gäum. (1922)
- Aecidium phrygilanthi H.S. Jacks. & Holw. (1927)
- Aecidium phyllanthi-floribundi Vienn.-Bourg. (1955)
- Aecidium phyllanthinum Syd. & P. Syd. (1907)
- Aecidium pichinchense Syd. (1939)
- Aecidium pienaarii Doidge (1927)
- Aecidium piptocarphae Henn. (1908)
- Aecidium pisi-formosi Syd. & P. Syd. (1908)
- Aecidium pisoniae Arthur & J.R. Johnst. (1918)
- Aecidium plantaginis-variae McAlpine (1906)
- Aecidium platylobii McAlpine (1906)
- Aecidium plectranthicola Cummins (1943)
- Aecidium plectroniicola Henn. (1903)
- Aecidium plenum Arthur (1918)
- Aecidium pleurospermi Tranzschel & Woron. (1914)
- Aecidium plucheae Henn. (1908)
- Aecidium plucheae-caspiae Zaprom. (1928)
- Aecidium plucheae-ovalis Syd. & P. Syd. (1914)
- Aecidium plukenetiae Berndt (2012)
- Aecidium poasense Syd. (1925)
- Aecidium poecilochromae H.S. Jacks. & Holw. (1932)
- Aecidium polygoni-cuspidati Dietel (1903)
- Aecidium ponderosum Syd. & P. Syd. (1906)
- Aecidium poonense Sathe (1966)
- Aecidium popowiae Henn. (1904)
- Aecidium posoqueriae Dietel (1908)
- Aecidium pottsii Doidge (1927)
- Aecidium praecipuum Arthur (1920)
- Aecidium pratae H.S. Jacks. & Holw. (1927)
- Aecidium pretoriense Doidge (1927)
- Aecidium primulinum Azbukina (1972)
- Aecidium prolixum Syd. & P. Syd. (1921)
- Aecidium prosopidicola Speg. (1925)
- Aecidium pseuderanthemi Syd. (1931)
- Aecidium psychotriae Henn. (1904)
- Aecidium ptarmicae J. Schröt. ex P. Syd. & Syd. (1923)
- Aecidium pucheae-caspicae Zaprom. (1928)
- Aecidium pulneyense T.S. Ramakr. & Sriniv. (1950)
- Aecidium pulogense Syd. (1931)
- Aecidium pulsatillae Tranzschel (1909)
- Aecidium pulverulentum Arthur (1906)
- Aecidium punicum Juel (1901)
- Aecidium pupaliae Prasad, L.C. Sharma & R.D. Singh (1962)
- Aecidium puracense Petr. (1955)
- Aecidium purpusiorum Henn. (1903)
- Aecidium puspa Racib. (1900)
- Aecidium puttemansianum Henn. (1908)
- Aecidium pycnostachydis (Kalchbr.) Doidge (1927)
- Aecidium pygei Syd. & P. Syd. (1912)

== Q ==
- Aecidium qinghaiense J.Y. Zhuang (1990)
- Aecidium quintum Syd. & P. Syd. (1917)
- Aecidium quitense H.S. Jacks. & Holw. (1932)

== R ==
- Aecidium raciborskii Wróbl. (1916)
- Aecidium ramosii Syd. (1923)
- Aecidium randiae Henn. (1896)
- Aecidium randiicola Speg. (1925)
- Aecidium ranunculi-depressi G. Cunn. (1930)
- Aecidium ranunculi-insignis G. Cunn. (1930)
- Aecidium ranunculi-lyallii G. Cunn. (1930)
- Aecidium ranunculi-monroi G. Cunn. (1930)
- Aecidium rauvolfiae Henn. (1908)
- Aecidium recedens Arthur (1904)
- Aecidium reichei Dietel (1914)
- Aecidium relhaniae Dippen. (1931)
- Aecidium renatum Arthur (1920)
- Aecidium residuum Arthur (1924)
- Aecidium reyesii Syd. (1923)
- Aecidium rhamni-infectoriae Unamuno (1934)
- Aecidium rhamni-japonici Dietel (1905)
- Aecidium rhinacanthi J.M. Yen (1974)
- Aecidium rhodesicum Cummins (1960)
- Aecidium rhytismoides Racib. (1900)
- Aecidium rhytismoideum Berk. & Broome (1854)
- Aecidium rickii P. Syd. & Syd. (1923)
- Aecidium rionegrense Henn. (1904)
- Aecidium rosenii Lingelsh. (1907)
- Aecidium rubiae Dietel (1905)
- Aecidium rubromaculans E. West (1941)
- Aecidium rutae Har. (1900)
- Aecidium rutideae Cummins (1943)

== S ==
- Aecidium salamii G.F. Laundon (1963)
- Aecidium salinum Lindr. (1902)
- Aecidium saltense J.C. Lindq. (1953)
- Aecidium sambucinum Arthur & Cummins (1933)
- Aecidium santanense J.C. Lindq. (1964)
- Aecidium sarcinatum Lindr. (1902)
- Aecidium satarense P.B. Chavan & S.K. Patil (1974)
- Aecidium satsumense Hirats. f. (1952)
- Aecidium saussureae-affinis Dietel (1905)
- Aecidium scabiosae Dozy & Molk. (1882)
- Aecidium sceptri Lindr. (1900)
- Aecidium schimperi Bacc. (1917)
- Aecidium schisandrae J.Y. Zhuang (1986)
- Aecidium schizophragmatis J.Y. Zhuang (1986)
- Aecidium schwabeae Pat. & Har. (1900)
- Aecidium schwenckiae-americanae J.M. Yen (1971)
- Aecidium schwenkiae Vienn.-Bourg. (1955)
- Aecidium scopariae Wakef. & Hansf. (1949)
- Aecidium scorzonerae-latifoliae M. Abbasi, Gjaerum & Hedjar. (1994)
- Aecidium scutellariae Syd. & P. Syd. (1907)
- Aecidium scutellariae-indicae Dietel (1908)
- Aecidium sebastianiae Mains (1939)
- Aecidium sedi H.A. Dietr. (1859)
- Aecidium sedi-aizoontis Tranzschel (1909)
- Aecidium seguelae Vienn.-Bourg. (1958)
- Aecidium selini Lindr. (1901)
- Aecidium semiaquilegiae Dietel (1907)
- Aecidium senecionis Desm. (1836)
- Aecidium senecionis-bupleuroidis Syd. & P. Syd. (1914)
- Aecidium senecionis-duriaei Gonz. Frag. (1913)
- Aecidium senecionis-jacksonii Gjaerum (2005)
- Aecidium senecionis-macrophylli Săvul. & O. Săvul. (1942)
- Aecidium senecionis-scandentis Sawada (1943)
- Aecidium senecionis-stenocephali Dietel (1900)
- Aecidium seneciophilum Speg. (1925)
- Aecidium seriatum Arthur (1918)
- Aecidium serpiculae Petch (1917)
- Aecidium serrae Syd. & P. Syd. (1912)
- Aecidium serratae Liou (1929)
- Aecidium shansiense Petr. (1947)
- Aecidium shiraianum Syd. & P. Syd. (1900)
- Aecidium sigesbeckiae Syd. & P. Syd. (1913)
- Aecidium silai Wartm. (1902)
- Aecidium simplicius Arthur & J.R. Johnst. (1918)
- Aecidium singulare (Dietel & Holw.) Arthur (1918)
- Aecidium sinhagadense Sathe (1966)
- Aecidium sinorhododendri G.W. Wilson (1921)
- Aecidium smilacinum Tranzschel (1939)
- Aecidium solaniphilum Speg. (1912)
- Aecidium solenanthi Zaprom. (1928)
- Aecidium sophorae Kusano (1904)
- Aecidium sparsum Hazsl. (1877)
- Aecidium speeae Gäum. (1936)
- Aecidium spegazzinianum Sacc. & Trotter (1912)
- Aecidium sphaeralceanum Sacc. & Trotter (1912)
- Aecidium spilanthis T.S. Ramakr. & Sundaram (1955)
- Aecidium spinaciae Rostr. (1907)
- Aecidium spinicola Doidge (1948)
- Aecidium spissum Syd. & P. Syd. (1912)
- Aecidium staphyleae Miura (1928)
- Aecidium stevenii Woron. (1913)
- Aecidium steviicola Arthur (1918)
- Aecidium stewartianum Cummins (1943)
- Aecidium stewartii Arthur & Cummins (1933)
- Aecidium stowardii Har. (1914)
- Aecidium stranvaesiae Syd. & P. Syd. (1907)
- Aecidium strobilanthicola Sawada ex G.F. Laundon (1963)
- Aecidium strobilanthinum Mitter (1935)
- Aecidium struthanthi H.S. Jacks. & Holw. (1927)
- Aecidium subantarcticum Speg. (1924)
- Aecidium subincarnatum Henn. (1904)
- Aecidium subsimulans Arthur & Mains (1920)
- Aecidium superalpinum Jørst. (1960)

== T ==
- Aecidium tafiense J.C. Lindq. (1952)
- Aecidium tafoense Cummins (1952)
- Aecidium taiyuanense B. Liu (1974)
- Aecidium talinophilum P. Syd. & Syd. (1923)
- Aecidium tami Z. Urb. (1967)
- Aecidium tandonii Mitter (1933)
- Aecidium tarapotense Henn. (1904)
- Aecidium tataricum Rostr. (1907)
- Aecidium tellinianum Sacc. (1904)
- Aecidium tenebrosum H.S. Jacks. & Holw. (1926)
- Aecidium tenerius Arthur & Holw. (1918)
- Aecidium teodorescoi Săvul. & O. Săvul. (1937)
- Aecidium terminaliae T.S. Ramakr. & K. Ramakr. (1948)
- Aecidium tetragoniae Doidge (1939)
- Aecidium teucrii-scorodoniae Har. (1900)
- Aecidium thapsiae-garganicae Casu (1907)
- Aecidium thapsiae-villosae Gonz. Frag. ex Sacc. & Trotter (1925)
- Aecidium thaungii A.A. Carvalho, J.F. Hennen & Figueiredo (2001)
- Aecidium thelymitrae Racib. (1900)
- Aecidium thenardiae Arthur (1918)
- Aecidium thevetiae Sacc. (1913)
- Aecidium thlaspianum Syd. & P. Syd. (1902)
- Aecidium thrinciae Unamuno (1942)
- Aecidium thunbergiae-fragrantis Syd. (1931)
- Aecidium thymelaeae Brandenb. & M. Steiner (1961)
- Aecidium thysselini Lindr. (1901)
- Aecidium tinneae Henn. (1903)
- Aecidium tithymali Arthur (1918)
- Aecidium torquens McAlpine (1906)
- Aecidium toxocarpi Cummins (1941)
- Aecidium tracyanum Syd. & P. Syd. (1901)
- Aecidium tragiicola Henn. (1904)
- Aecidium transvaaliae Henn. & Pole-Evans (1908)
- Aecidium tranzschelianum Lindr. (1901)
- Aecidium travancoricum T.S. Ramakr. (1959)
- Aecidium traversiae G. Cunn. (1928)
- Aecidium trichodesmatis Kuprev. (1950)
- Aecidium tricholepidis P.B. Chavan & Bakare (1973)
- Aecidium trigonotidis Syd. & P. Syd. (1909)
- Aecidium trinitense W.T. Dale (1955)
- Aecidium triostei Arthur (1906)
- Aecidium tristagmatis Jørst. (1957)
- Aecidium trixiphilum Speg. (1926)
- Aecidium tsugae Sawada (1950)
- Aecidium tuberosae Henn. (1904)
- Aecidium tubulosum Pat. & Gaillard (1889)
- Aecidium tucumanense Sacc. & P. Syd. (1902)
- Aecidium tumbayense J.C. Lindq. (1953)
- Aecidium turnerae Henn. (1904)
- Aecidium tylophorae Cooke (1890)

== U ==
- Aecidium ugandense Syd. & P. Syd. (1910)
- Aecidium ulei Henn. (1904)
- Aecidium ulluci Jørst. (1956)
- Aecidium umbilici Trotter (1901)
- Aecidium uredinoides Henn. (1905)
- Aecidium urenae Vienn.-Bourg. (1959)
- Aecidium urgineae Henn. & Pole-Evans (1908)
- Aecidium ushuwaiense Speg. (1924)
- Aecidium ussuriense Azbukina (1972)
- Aecidium usterianum Speg. (1908)
- Aecidium uvariae-rufae Henn. (1908)

== V ==
- Aecidium valdivianum Sacc. & P. Syd. (1899)
- Aecidium vanderystianum Henn. (1907)
- Aecidium velenovskyi Bubák (1900)
- Aecidium venezuelanum Jørst. (1960)
- Aecidium veratri Azbukina (1972)
- Aecidium verbenae Speg. (1880)
- Aecidium vernoniae-appendiculatae Bouriquet & Bassino (1966)
- Aecidium vernoniae-cinereae Petch (1917)
- Aecidium vernoniae-hookerianae Petch (1917)
- Aecidium vernoniae-mollis Mayor (1914)
- Aecidium vernoniae-monocephalae Doidge (1927)
- Aecidium vernoniae-podocomae Doidge (1927)
- Aecidium veronicae-sibiricae P. Syd. & Syd. (1923)
- Aecidium viburni Henn. & Shirai (1900)
- Aecidium viburnophilum Syd. & P. Syd. (1917)
- Aecidium vincetoxici Henn. & Shirai (1900)
- Aecidium vinnulum H.S. Jacks. & Holw. (1931)
- Aecidium virgatum Lindr. (1902)
- Aecidium viscosum J.C. Lindq. (1953)

== W ==
- Aecidium walayarense T.S. Ramakr. & Sundaram (1955)
- Aecidium warneckeanum Henn. (1905)
- Aecidium wedeliae-hispidae Dietel (1922)
- Aecidium wenshanense (F.L. Tai) J.Y. Zhuang & S.X. Wei (2016)
- Aecidium werneriae Jørst. (1956)
- Aecidium werneriicola Jørst. (1956)
- Aecidium westlandicum G. Cunn. (1928)
- Aecidium wiehei Cummins (1952)
- Aecidium wikstroemiae B. Li (1987)
- Aecidium wildemanianum Syd. & P. Syd. (1909)
- Aecidium willemetiae Woron. (1922)
- Aecidium williamsii Ricker (1904)
- Aecidium woodianum Doidge (1927)
- Aecidium wulffiae Henn. (1904)

== Y ==
- Aecidium yapoense Vienn.-Bourg. (1955)
- Aecidium yucatanense Mains (1935)
- Aecidium yuccae Arthur (1922)

== Z ==
- Aecidium zanthoxyli-schinifolii Dietel (1905)
- Aecidium zephyranthis Shear (1902)
- Aecidium zernyanum Petr. (1955)
- Aecidium zonatum Sacc. (1913)
- Aecidium zorniae-gibbosae P.B. Chavan (1969)
