= Gymnosporangium mori =

Scientific classification
- Domain: Eukaryota
- Kingdom: Fungi
- Division: Basidiomycota
- Class: Pucciniomycetes
- Order: Pucciniales
- Family: Gymnosporangiaceae
- Genus: Gymnosporangium
- Species: G. mori

Binomial name
- Gymnosporangium mori (Barclay) T.Kasuya, K.Hosaka, Jing X.Ji & Kakish.

Synonyms
- Caeoma mori Barclay; Aecidium mori (Barclay) Barclay; Peridiopsora mori (Barclay) K.V. Prasad, B.R.D.Yadav & Sullia; Uredo mori (Barclay) Sacc.

Species of fungus

Gymnosporangium mori is a species of fungus in the order Pucciniales. It can only be found on flowering plants of the species Morus, the mulberries. It is found in Asia.

== Taxonomy ==
In 1890, British mycologist Arthur Barclay had identified this species of fungus to be a synonym of Caeoma mori and changed its name to Aecidium mori. The name was changed back to the original a short time later, after Aecidium mori was more commonly used. Barclay also believed the Ficus palmata species of fungi was identical as well, which was later proven wrong. Another change to the naming was to Peridiopsora mori (Barclay) K.V. Prasad et al. 1993, a combination of all three names, but it has not been adopted at all in taxonomy. It was decided later in 1993 that Aecidium mori was a different, distinct species, and this taxonomic assignment was kept. All of these differ from the species of A. mori.

== Mulberry rust ==
Mulberry rust is a disease caused by Gymnosporangium mori, which only occurs on the Morus plant, the familiar mulberry. Morus is grown for the breeding of Bombyx mori (silkworms) as part of the silk industry. The leaves of the Morus plant are the only source of food and nutrition for silkworms, as their growth, larval development and its production of cocoons are dependent on the plant. Mulberry rust affects buds, leaves and branches, resulting in a decrease of quality of the leaves and their quantity. It is most common in China.

== Distribution ==
Gymnosporangium mori is only found in Asia, and located on the flowering plant of Morus. The fungus is most common in India.
