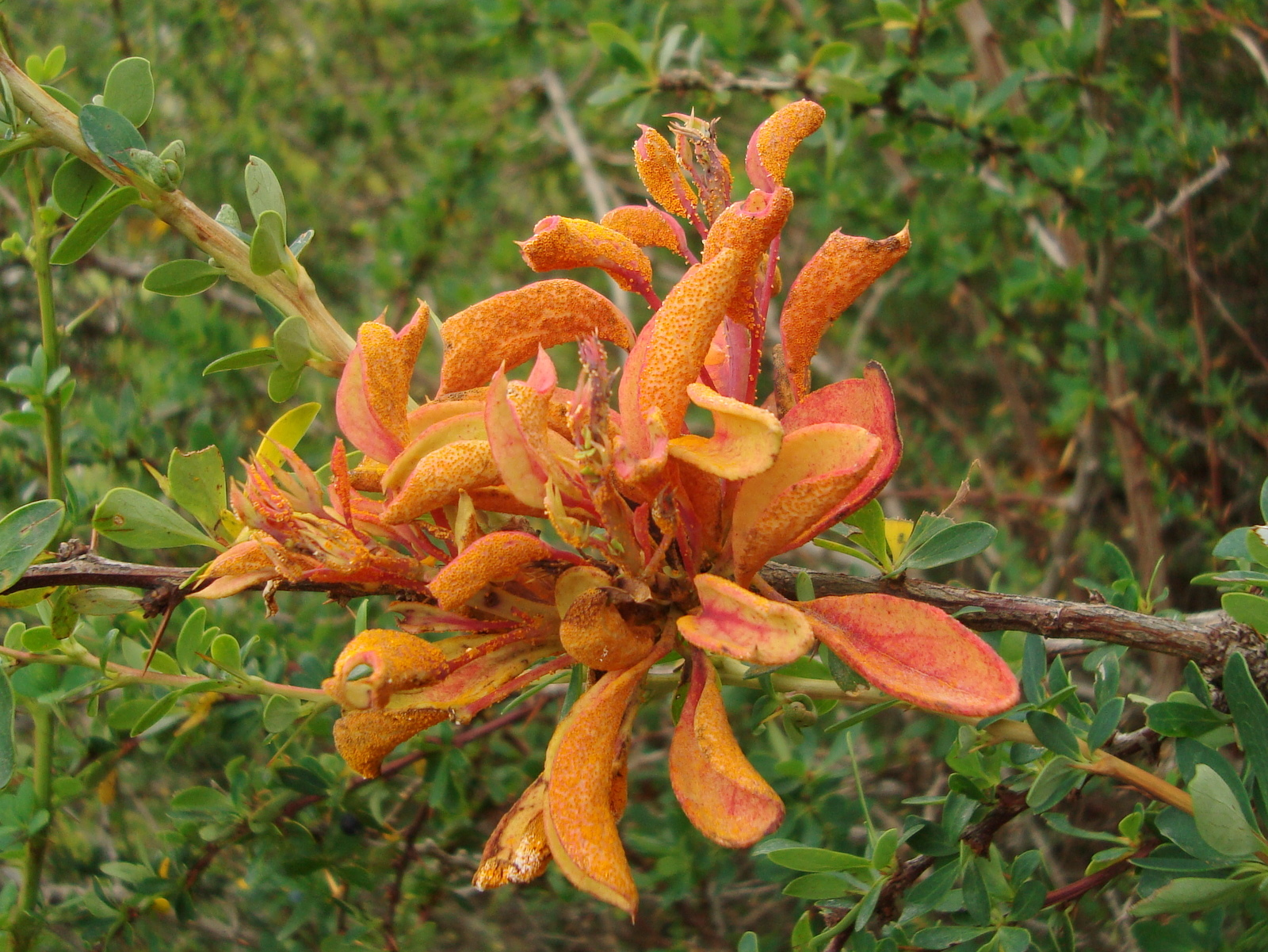
- Calafate rust growing on the shrub Beriberis microphylla in Chile.

Scientific classification
- Domain: Eukaryota
- Kingdom: Fungi
- Division: Basidiomycota
- Class: Pucciniomycetes
- Order: Pucciniales
- Family: incertae sedis
- Genus: Aecidium
- Species: A. magellanicum

Binomial name
- Aecidium magellanicum Berk. (1847)

= Aecidium magellanicum =

Species of fungus

Aecidium magellanicum, commonly known as the calafate rust, is a species of rust fungi. This fungus can cause a growth defect known as a witches broom, an excessive growth of stems from a single point on a branch. The species is known to infect the evergreen shrub Berberis buxifolia in Argentina and Chile.
