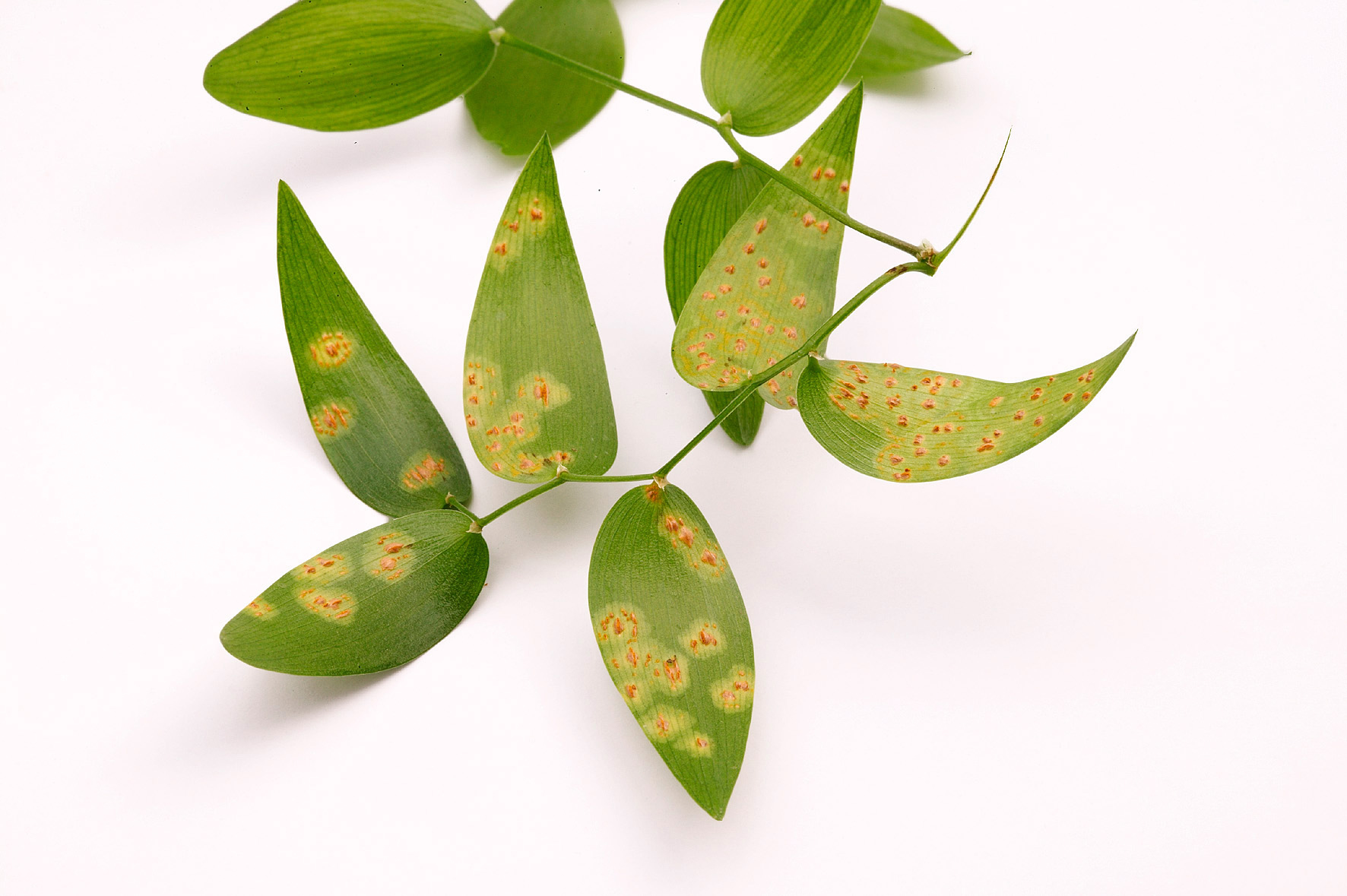

Scientific classification
- Kingdom: Fungi
- Division: Basidiomycota
- Class: Pucciniomycetes
- Order: Pucciniales
- Family: Pucciniaceae
- Genus: Puccinia
- Species: P. myrsiphylli

Binomial name
- Puccinia myrsiphylli (Thüm.) G.Winter (1884)

Synonyms
- Uredo myrsiphylli Thüm. (1877); Dicaeoma myrsiphylli (Thüm.) Kuntze (1898)

= Puccinia myrsiphylli =

Bridal creeper rust

Species of fungus

Puccinia myrsiphylli is a rust fungus in the genus Puccinia, family Pucciniaceae, and is native to South Africa. It has been tested, introduced, and targeted in Australia and New Zealand as an effective biocontrol agent for Asparagus asparagoides, also known as bridal creeper.

== Taxonomy ==
Puccinia myrsiphylli was initially described by Felix von Thümen in 1877. Ethel M. Doidge noted Paul Sydow's 1884 monograph as a resource for this species. P. myrsiphylli was described further in 1926. Later, in 1932, Doidge made an entry describing each section starting with: "[Aecidia]," "Uredo-sori hypophyllous," and "Teleuto-sori". She ends this entry by writing, "I have not seen the aecidia." P. myrsiphylli is in the family Pucciniaceae, and the host-substratum are leaves that are alive from Myrsiphyllum falciforme.

== Description ==
Puccinia myrsiphylli is a rust fungus with the following characteristics: "Uredospores ellipsoid or sub-globose, pale yellow 30-40 x 26-30 μ; epispore hyaline, about 1.5 μ thick, closely and finely echinulate and with 4-5 scattered germ pores…Teleutospores oblong, cuneate or clavate, apex rounded, acuminate or truncate, usually attenuate at the base, usually gently constricted at the septum, light brown, darker at the apex, 43-70 x 17-28 μ; epispore smooth, about 1.5 μ thick, thickened at the apex (up to 7 μ); germ pores obscure, pedicel short, fragile, hyaline or tinged with brown."

The rust fungus shows up in early to late autumn with little, orange structures on the top of the leaves of the A. Asparagoides, and looking like warts. This is the spermagonia and pycnia stage of the disease cycle. Next, there are aecia, which take the form of cup-shapes and are also orange, but they are on the under side of the leaves. The aecia produce aeciospores, and lead to uredinia. Uredinia and telia are on the under side of the leaves, but also on stems. The uredeina are also orange and in the shape of pustules, while the telia are a brown-black color, but also in the shape of pustules. The uredinia produce urediniospores, which are dispersed by the wind. Telia occur several weeks later. Then the telia produce thick-walled resting spores called teliospores.

P. myrsiphylli is likely macrocyclic because it includes all five spores stages. It is also likely autoecious because field reports show that pycnia, aecia, uredinia, and telia of P. myrsiphylli were found on A. asparagoides. No other host plants outside of A. asparagoides are required for P. myrsiphylli to complete its life cycle. The researchers in this study found dormant teliospores on extremely diseased cladodes and stems around spring/early summer time in the winter/rainfall region. This suggests that the fungus survives the dry summer months on debris, when above-ground biomass of host plants have stopped growing. It is the thick-walled teliospores that make sure the rust can survive when bridal creeper deteriorates during the summer. P. myrsipjylli recycles each 3–4 weeks during the summer.

P. myrsiphylli has two natural enemies: Cecidomyiidae larva and Eudarluca caricis. However, these two enemies do not look like they have a major impact on P. myrsiphylli.

== Distribution and habitat ==
Puccinia myrsiphylli is found in Eastern Cape Province in South Africa. P. myrsiphylli was present in South Africa in winter regions, aseasonal regions, and summer rainfall regions in all regions where there is widespread A. asparagoides. In southern Africa, the occurrence of P. myrsiphylli was dependent on the existence of living foliage of its host plant and season of rainfall. P. myrsiphylli is a very flexible pathogen, as shown by its ability to distribute widely throughout many different South African climate regions. It can also survive harsh, dry conditions without its host. P. myrsiphylli can be found in South Africa, Australia, and New Zealand.

== Biological control agent ==
Surveys identified Puccinia myrsiphylli as a possible biological control agent for A. asparagoides, which is also called bridal creeper. Bridal creeper is originally from southern Africa, and has been in Australia since 1871. Surveys were conducted in South Africa to find out if P. myrsiphylli would be able to spread as a possible biological control for A. asparagoides. Specificity information was also gathered because safety is a key criterion for introduction of a biological control agent into a different country. A study showed that it had a limited host range, which supported the introduction of the rust into Australia. In 2000, P. myrsiphylli was approved for introduction into Australia (Kleinjan et al., 2004). Conservationists see bridal creeper in areas of native vegetation as a threat, and had approved it as a target of biological control.

In New South Wales, Australia, P. myrsiphylli has been monitored, and there is reason for optimism that it is affecting the growth of A. asparagoides. From July 2000 to November 2001, the rust was monitored at three places in New South Wales: Scheyville National Park near Windsor, Eurobodalla National Park near Moruya, and Bar Beach near Narooma. The monitoring showed that the epidemic could have a heavy and detrimental impact on A. asparagoides. However, the spread was up to 30 m in the first four months after the release, which is relatively slow. A glasshouse experiment was also done. The result was that in the infected plant, the number of tubers, rhizome length, and shoot mass decreased by 60%. P. myrsiphylli builds up resistance and oversummering inoculum which allows it to survive the harsh, dry summer and to return for the next growing season.

The rust fungus Puccinia myrsiphylli requires 8 hours or more of the leaf being wet in order to infect bridal creeper. Between 16 and 20 degrees Celsius is the optimal infection temperature. However, infection is totally stopped at 25 degrees Celsius. In tests, P. myrsiphylli only develops successfully on A. asparagoides. Every other species tested were unaffected or very resistant to the rust. For P. myrsiphylli to be effective, it needs to attack the bridal creeper's root system because 90% of bridal creeper's biomass is below-ground rhizomes and tubers. The way P. myrsiphylli works is by infecting leaves and stems, which cause heavy defoliation of bridal creeper plants. It limits the nutrients and water available for the host plant's production of vegetation and reproduction. P. myrsiphylli also reduces the photosynthetic surface, which destroys leaf tissue. The rust destroys the capacities of A. asparagoides in 20 weeks. Morin believes it will likely take several years for P. myrsiphylli to decrease the biomass below ground.

P. myrsiphylli has gone above and beyond expectations, because it did not die and recolonized at specific places in between seasons. The rust is particularly effective in coastal areas, where conditions are ripe for epidemic growth. Those who use, develop, and manage land in Australia have excitedly used P. myrsiphylli at more than 2,500 locations around Australia. Combining P. myrsiphylli with another biological control agent, a leafhopper, Zygina sp., acted together to lessen the growth of rhizome length and number and biomass of tubers in A. asparagoides. In addition, a long-term 7-year study has shown decreases in seedling, shoot numbers, and above-ground biomass of A. asparagoides across all sites that were observed (using the biological control agents of the leafhopper and P. myrsiphylli). Some sites recorded greater declines in A. asparagoides on trellises than others due to varying climate and leafhopper factors. Due to the expansive nature of the study, scientists feel confident that the biocontrol agents of leafhopper and Puccinia myrsiphylli played a role in the decline of A. asparagoides.

After P. myrsiphylli was introduced in Australia, it was also detected in New Zealand. New Zealand is also trying to find ways to deal with undesirable weeds. Invasive exotic weeds have a negative impact on production and biodiversity. Puccinia myrsiphylli has spread across bridal creeper's range in northern New Zealand. It as an effective biocontrol agent in New Zealand. P. myrsiphylli is seen as a high quality example of effective biological control in New Zealand's 90-year history of weed biocontrol studies. P. myrsiphylli is likely effective by itself, but it has also been tested with other fungal pathogens. For example, it has been tested with Colletotrichum Gloeosporioides. In that test C. Gloeosporioides was only mildly effective on its own. This illustrates that P. myrsiphylli is seen as the most impactful biological control agent in this situation. The Environmental Risk Management Authority of New Zealand was attempting to "de-new" the classification of Puccinia myrsiphylli, which would allow those who use, develop, and manage land in Australia to manipulate P. myrsiphylli for even greater biocontrol effectiveness.
