= Aecidium breyniae =

Scientific classification
- Kingdom: Fungi
- Division: Basidiomycota
- Class: Pucciniomycetes
- Order: Pucciniales
- Family: incertae sedis
- Genus: Aecidium
- Species: A. breyniae

Binomial name
- Aecidium breyniae Syd., P. Syd (1907)

Species of fungus

Aecidium breyniae is a species of fungus in the Pucciniales order. It was described by Syd. and P. Syd in 1907.

It was found on the leaves of Breynia rhamnoides in Delhi, India.
