= Aecidium aechmantherae =

Scientific classification
- Domain: Eukaryota
- Kingdom: Fungi
- Division: Basidiomycota
- Class: Pucciniomycetes
- Order: Pucciniales
- Family: incertae sedis
- Genus: Aecidium
- Species: A. aechmantherae

Binomial name
- Aecidium aechmantherae Syd. & P. Syd (1907)

Species of fungus

Aecidium aechmantherae is a species of fungus in the Pucciniales order. It was described by Syd. and P. Syd in 1907.

It was found on the leaves of Aechmanthera tomentosa in Uttarakhand, India.
