= Aecidium amaryllidis =

Scientific classification
- Kingdom: Fungi
- Division: Basidiomycota
- Class: Pucciniomycetes
- Order: Pucciniales
- Family: incertae sedis
- Genus: Aecidium
- Species: A. amaryllidis

Binomial name
- Aecidium amaryllidis Syd., P. Syd & E.J.Butler (1912)

Species of fungus

Aecidium amaryllidis is a species of fungus in the Pucciniales order. It was described by Syd., P. Syd and E.J.Butler in 1912.

It was found on the leaves of Amaryllis species in Uttarakhand, India.
