= Caeoma elegans =

Scientific classification
- Kingdom: Fungi
- Division: Basidiomycota
- Class: Pucciniomycetes
- Order: Pucciniales
- Genus: Caeoma
- Species: C. elegans

Binomial name
- Caeoma elegans Schlecht.

Species of fungus

Caeoma elegans is a species of rusts.
