= Mahonia microphylla =

Conservation status
- Vulnerable (IUCN 3.1)

Scientific classification
- Kingdom: Plantae
- Clade: Tracheophytes
- Clade: Angiosperms
- Clade: Eudicots
- Order: Ranunculales
- Family: Berberidaceae
- Genus: Mahonia
- Species: M. microphylla

Binomial name
- Mahonia microphylla T.S.Ying & G.R.Long

Species of shrub

Mahonia microphylla is a shrub in the Berberidaceae first described as a species in 1999. It is endemic to Guangxi Province in China.

The species is listed as vulnerable, but its taxonomic status is uncertain with Plants of the World Online and World Flora Online listing it as "unplaced" or "unchecked and awaiting taxonomic scrutiny" respectively.

Mahonia microphylla should not be confused with Berberis microphylla G.Forst., native to South America.
