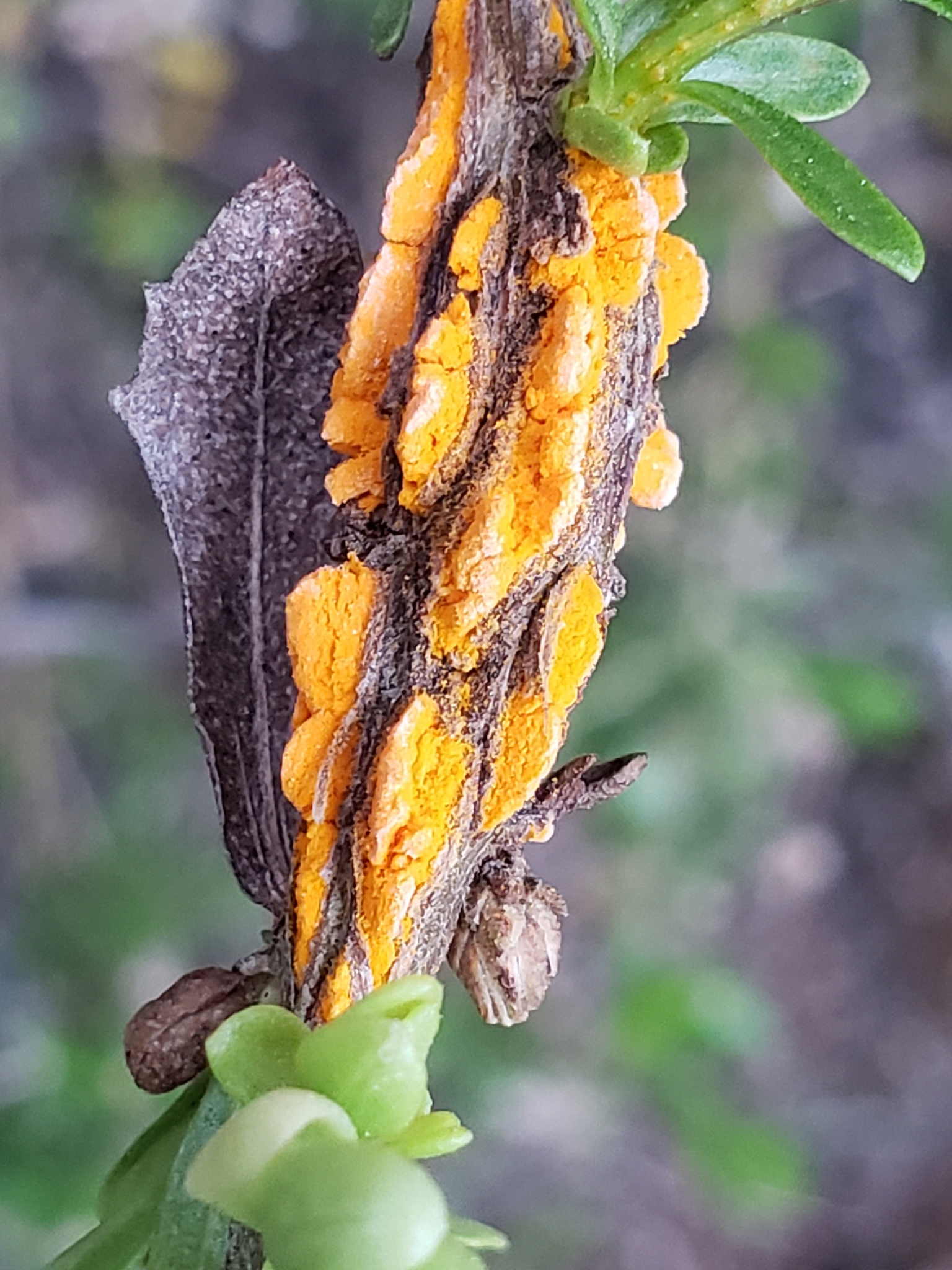

Scientific classification
- Domain: Eukaryota
- Kingdom: Fungi
- Division: Basidiomycota
- Class: Pucciniomycetes
- Order: Pucciniales
- Family: Pucciniaceae
- Genus: Puccinia
- Species: P. evadens

Binomial name
- Puccinia evadens Hark.

Synonyms
- Coleosporium baccharidis, Cooke & Hark.; Eriosporangium evadens; Dicaeoma evadens

= Puccinia evadens =

Species of rust fungus

Puccinia evadens is a species of rust fungus that is found on Baccharis plants. According to Manual of the Rusts in United States and Canada (1934), Puccinia evadens is present throughout the Americas and the Caribbean.
