= Peter Nielsen (botanist) =

Peter Nielsen (28 July 1829 – 30 September 1897) was a Danish botanist and plant pathologist.

He was born at a farm in Vonsbæk parish in the Duchy of Schleswig. He graduated in 1857 from Jelling Statsseminarium in Vejle. He was employed at Flakkebjerg Institute from 1857-1859. In 1859, he became a school teacher at Ørslev in Zealand, where he studied the local flora. He was particularly interested in plants useful to agriculture and in plant pathogens. He was a prolific writer on these topics. He undertook meticulous studies of rust fungi.

He was the first to describe the host alternation of Puccinia poarum between grasses and Tussilago farfara.

He issued the exsiccata Exsiccatsamling af Characeer navnlig fra Danmark utgivne af P. Nielsen.
