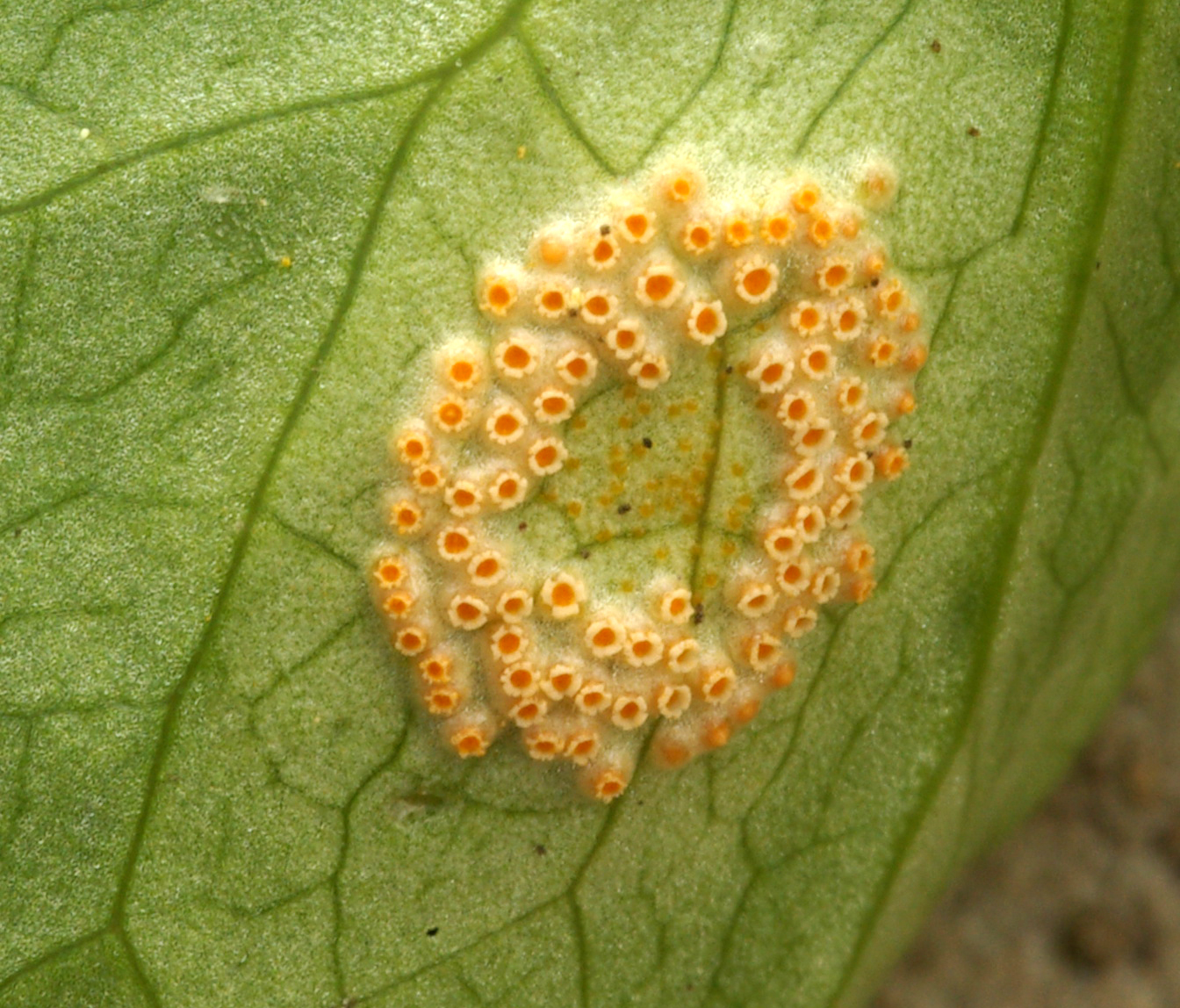
- Puccinia sessilis aecia on leaf of Arum maculatum

Scientific classification
- Domain: Eukaryota
- Kingdom: Fungi
- Division: Basidiomycota
- Class: Pucciniomycetes
- Order: Pucciniales
- Family: Pucciniaceae
- Genus: Puccinia
- Species: P. sessilis

Binomial name
- Puccinia sessilis J.Schröt. (1870)

Synonyms
- Aecidium allii Grev., Fl. Edin.: 447 (1824); Aecidium ari Desm., Catal. des plantes omis.: 26 (1823); Aecidium ari Berk., in Smith, Engl. Fl., Fungi (Edn 2) (London) 5(2): 369 (1836); Aecidium convallariae Schumach., Enum. pl. (Kjbenhavn) 2: 224 (1803); Aecidium convallariae Link, Mag. Gesell. naturf. Freunde, Berlin 8: 29 (1816); Aecidium convallariae Desm. [as 'convalariae'], Catal. des plantes omis.: 26 (1823); Aecidium orchidearum Desm., Catal. des plantes omis.: 26 (1823); Dicaeoma phalaridis (Plowr.) Kuntze, Revis. gen. pl. (Leipzig) 3(3): 470 (1898); Pleomeris sessilis Syd., Annls mycol. 19(3-4): 171 (1921); Puccinia allii-phalaridis Kleb., Jb. wiss. Bot. 34: 399 (1899); Puccinia ari-phalaridis Kleb., Jb. wiss. Bot. 34: 399 (1899); Puccinia digraphidis Soppitt, J. Bot., Lond. 28: 215 (1890); Puccinia festucina Syd. & P. Syd., Annls mycol. 10(2): 217 (1912); Puccinia linearis Roberge, Ann. Sci. Nat. 4: 125 (1855); Puccinia orchidearum-phalaridis Kleb., Z. PflKrankh. PflSchutz 7: 33 (1897); Puccinia paridis Plowr., J. Linn. Soc., Bot. 30: 43 (1895); Puccinia paridis-digraphidis Plowr. ex Kleb., Z. PflKrankh. 6: 261 (1896); Puccinia phalaridis Plowr., J. Linn. Soc., Bot. 24: 88 (1888); Puccinia sessilis W.G. Schneid., Hedwigia 10(1): 10 (1871); Puccinia winteriana Magnus, Hedwigia 33: 78 (1894); Trichobasis ari (Desm.) Lév., in Orbigny, Dict. Univ. Hist. Nat. 12: 785 (1849)

= Puccinia sessilis =

Species of fungus

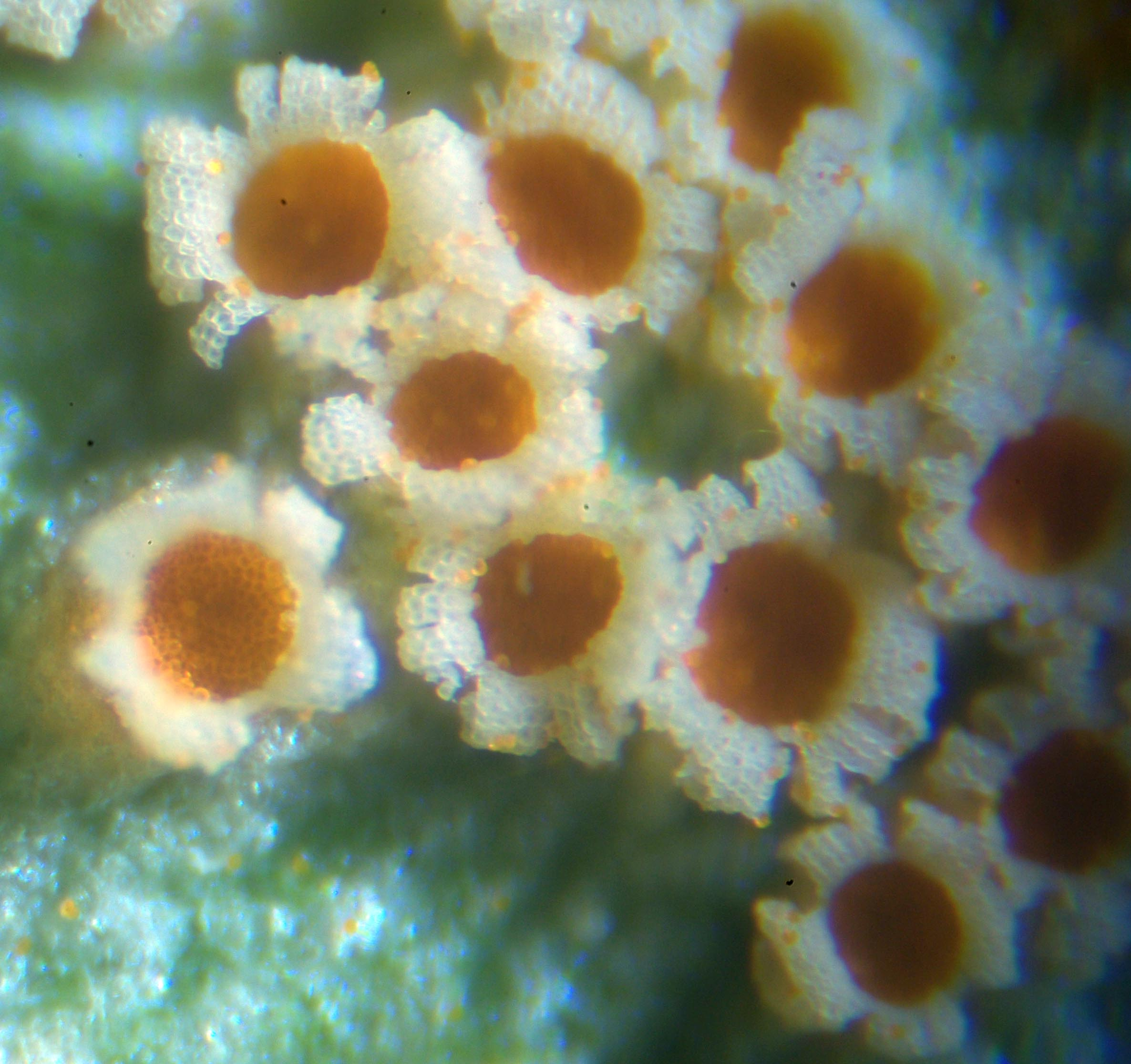
Close up of aecidia of Puccinia sessilis

Puccinia sessilis is a fungal species and plant pathogen, which is also known as arum rust or ramsons rust. It commonly infects Arum maculatum and Allium ursinum causing yellow to orange circular patches on leaves. On the underside of the leaves, it produces raised orange aecia commonly covered in spores. It is common in Eurasia in the spring.

It was originally found on the leaves of Iris versicolor in New York, USA. Other plant species affected by this rust include Convallaria majalis, Dactylorhiza fuchsii, Dactylorhiza incarnata, Dactylorhiza majalis, Gymnadenia conopsea, Neottia ovata, Paris quadrifolia and Phalaris arundinacea.

A specialised form, Puccinia sessilis f.sp. narcissi-orchidacearum Boerema & Kesteren (now called Aecidium narcissi) is a cause of rust in daffodils (Narcissus) and also on various wild Orchidaceae species.

== See also ==
- List of Puccinia species
