= Aecidium campanulastri =

Scientific classification
- Domain: Eukaryota
- Kingdom: Fungi
- Division: Basidiomycota
- Class: Pucciniomycetes
- Order: Pucciniales
- Family: incertae sedis
- Genus: Aecidium
- Species: A. campanulastri

Binomial name
- Aecidium campanulastri G.W.Wilson (1911)

Species of fungus

Aecidium campanulastri is a species of fungus in the Pucciniales order. A plant pathogen, it was described as new to science in 1910.
