= Aecidium caspicum =

Scientific classification
- Kingdom: Fungi
- Division: Basidiomycota
- Class: Pucciniomycetes
- Order: Pucciniales
- Family: incertae sedis
- Genus: Aecidium
- Species: A. caspicum

Binomial name
- Aecidium caspicum Jacz. (1900)

Species of fungus

Aecidium caspicum is a fungal plant pathogen.
