= Aecidium narcissi =

Scientific classification
- Domain: Eukaryota
- Kingdom: Fungi
- Division: Basidiomycota
- Class: Pucciniomycetes
- Order: Pucciniales
- Family: incertae sedis
- Genus: Aecidium
- Species: A. narcissi

Binomial name
- Aecidium narcissi Liou

Synonyms
- Puccinia sessilis f.sp. narcissi-orchidacearum Boerema & Kesteren

Species of fungus

Aecidium narcissi is a species of fungus in the Pucciniales order, causing rust in daffodils (Narcissus) and various wild Orchidaceae.

== Bibliography ==
Boerema & van Kesteren, in Versl. Meded. plziektenk. Dienst Wageningen 156 (Jaarb. 1979): [12-]14[-16]. 1980
