= Aecidium cannabis =

Scientific classification
- Domain: Eukaryota
- Kingdom: Fungi
- Division: Basidiomycota
- Class: Pucciniomycetes
- Order: Pucciniales
- Family: incertae sedis
- Genus: Aecidium
- Species: A. cannabis

Binomial name
- Aecidium cannabis Szembel (1927)

Species of fungus

Aecidium cannabis is a species of fungus in the Pucciniales order. It is a plant pathogen.
