= Fenestellaceae =

Scientific classification
- Kingdom: Fungi
- Division: Ascomycota
- Class: Dothideomycetes
- Order: Pleosporales
- Family: Fenestellaceae; M.E. Barr, 1979

Type genus
- Fenestella Tul. & C. Tul., 1863

Family of fungi

The Fenestellaceae are a family of fungi with an uncertain taxonomic placement in the class Dothideomycetes.

== Genera ==
As accepted by GBIF;

- Fenestella Tul. & C.Tul. - 40 spp.
- Lojkania Rehm, 1905 - 10 spp.
- Sydowina Petr. 1923 - 2 spp.
