= Hans Sydow =

German mycologist and botanist (1879–1946)

- Born: 29 January 1879; Berlin
- Died: 6 June 1946 (aged 67); Berlin
- Scientific career
- Fields: Mycology
- Author abbrev. (botany): Syd.

Hans Sydow (29 January 1879 – 6 June 1946) was a German mycologist and the son of mycologist and lichenologist, Paul Sydow (1851–1925).

== Career ==
Hans Sydow worked at the Dresdner Bank in Berlin between 1904 and 1937 rising to divisional manager in 1922. Before, during and after this time he also pursued a career as a mycologist. Together with his father he co-authored many works before his father's death in 1925, most substantial of which were four volumes of monographs on the Uredinales (now called Pucciniales), Monographia Uredinearum seu specierum omnium ad hunc usque diem descriptio et adumbratio systematica (Monograph on the Uredinales, description of known species and outline of systematics). The first volume covered the genus Puccinia and the second the genus Uromyces. The third volume described the systematics and taxonomy used to classify the family and provided a key as well as further descriptions of other genera including Gymnosporangium and Phragmidium. The final volume published covered the related genera; Peridermium, Aecidium, Monosporidium, Roestelia, Caeoma, Uredo and Mapea.

His manuscripts and extensive collection were burned in Berlin in 1943.

Hans Sydow was a prolific author (or coauthor) of new fungal species, having formally described 3451 in his career. He was founding editor of the journal Annales Mycologici, established in 1903, and he remained the journal's editor in chief until his death in 1946. Between 1903 and 1943 Sydow edited the exsiccata series Fungi exotici exsiccati and Mycotheca Germanica, the second series at the beginning with his father Paul Sydow.

== Honours ==
Following Sydow's death, Annales Mycologici was retitled with the prefix Sydowia in his honour. In the following issue, Franz Petrak, who had published papers with Sydow since the early 1920s, succeeded Sydow as editor in chief and published an obituary in the subsequent volume.

Several taxa of fungi were named in his honour;

- Sydowiella (family Sydowiellaceae) by Petr. in 1923
- Sydowina (family Fenestellaceae) by Petr. in 1923
- Sydowinula (family Nitschkiaceae) by Petr. in 1923
- Sydowiellina (family Schizothyriaceae) by Bat. & I.H.Lima in 1959

A subspecies of Bryum capillare received the suffix "sydowii" by Czech botanist, Josef Podpěra.

== Selected publications ==
- Sydow, H (1905). "Mycotheca Germanica Fasc. VII: 301-350". Annales Mycologici. 3: 231–234.
- Diedicke, H; Sydow, H (1908). "Über Paepalopsis deformans Syd". Annales Mycologici (in German). 6: 301–305. 12 figs.
- Sydow, H (1911). "Mycotheca Germanica Fasc. XX – XXI: 951-1050". Annales Mycologici. 9 (5): 554–565.
- —— (1913). "Mycotheca Germanica. Fasc. XXIV: 1151-1200". Annales Mycologici. 11: 364–366.
- —— (1913). "Fungi orientalis Caucasici novi". Вестник Тифлисского Ботанического Сада. 26: 5–6.
- —— (1914). "Beiträge zur Kenntnis der Pilzflora des südlichen Ostindiens – II". Annales Mycologici (in German). 12 (5): 484–490.
- —— (1914). "Mycotheca Germanica Fasc. XXV-XXVI: 1201-1300". Annales Mycologici. 12: 535–538.
- Theissen, F; Sydow, H (1915). "Die Dothideales". Annales Mycologici (in German). 13 (3): 149–746.
- Bubák, F; Sydow, H (1915). "Einige neue Pilze". Annales Mycologici (in German). 13: 7–12.
- Sydow, H (1921). "Mycotheca Germanica Fasc. XXIX-XXXVI: 1401-1800". Annales Mycologici. 19: 132–144.
- —— (1921). "Die Verwertung der Verwandtschaftverhaltnisse und des gegenwartigen Entwicklungsganges zur Umgrenzung der Gattungen bei den Uredineen". Annales Mycologici (in German). 19: 161–175.
- —— (1921). "Novae fungorum species – XVII". Annales Mycologici. 19: 304–309.
- —— (1922). "Über einige weitere im südlichen China (Kwangtung-Provinz) gesammelte Pilze". Annales Mycologici (in German). 20: 61–65.
- Petrak, F; Sydow, H (1923). "Kritisch-systematische Originaluntersuchungen über Pyrenomyzeten, Sphaeropsideen und Melanconieen". Annales Mycologici (in German). 21 (5–6): 349–384.
- ——; —— (1924). "Kritisch-systematische Origenaluntersuchungen über Pyrenomyzeten, Sphaeropsideen und Melanconieen". Annales Mycologici (in German). 22 (1–2): 318–386.
- ——; —— (1925). "Kritisch-systematisch Originaluntersuchungen über Pyrenomyzeten, Sphaeropsideen und Melanconieen". Annales Mycologici (in German). 23: 209–294.
- ——; —— (1926). "Die Gattungen der Pyrenomyzeten, Sphaeropsideen und Melanconieen. I. Der phaeosporen Sphaeropsideen und die Gattung Macrophoma". Feddes Repertorium Spec. Nov. Regni Vegetabilum Beihefte (in German). 42 (1): 1–551. (publ. 1927).
- Doidge, Ethel Mary; Sydow, H (1928). "The South African species of the Meliolineae". Bothalia. 2 (2): 424–472.
- Petrak, F; Sydow, H (1929). "Kritisch-systematisch Originaluntersuchungen über Pyrenomyzeten, Sphaeropsideen und Melanconieen. IV". Annales Mycologici (in German). 27: 87–115.
- ——; —— (1934). "Kritisch-systematisch Originaluntersuchungen über Pyrenomyzeten, Sphaeropsideen und Melanconieen. V". Annales Mycologici (in German). 32: 1–35.
- ——; —— (1936). "Kritisch-systematische Originaluntersuchungen über Pyrenomyzeten, Sphaeropsideen und Melanconieen. VII". Annales Mycologici (in German). 34 (1–2): 11–52.
- ——; —— (1936). "Ein kleiner Beitrag zur Kenntnis der Pilzflora Japans". Annales Mycologici (in German). 34 (3): 237–251.
- ——; —— (1939). "Über die Gattung Amerosporium Speg. und ihre nächsten Verwandten". Physis Buenos Aires (in German). 15: 79–86.

=== Books ===
- Sydow, Paul; Sydow, Hans (1904). Monographia Uredinearum seu specierum omnium ad hunc usque diem descriptio et adumbratio systematica. The genus Puccinia. Vol. 1. Leipzig: Borntraeger. pp. 1–972.
- ——; —— (1910). Monographia Uredinearum seu specierum omnium ad hunc usque diem descriptio et adumbratio systematica. The genus Uromyces. Vol. 2. Leipzig: Borntraeger. pp. 1–396.
- ——; —— (1915). Monographia Uredinearum seu specierum omnium ad hunc usque diem descriptio et adumbratio systematica. Fasciculus I.:Puccineaceae. Vol. 3. Leipzig: Borntraeger. pp. 1–728.
- ——; —— (1924). Monographia Uredinearum seu specierum omnium ad hunc usque diem descriptio et adumbratio systematica. Uredineae Imperfecti (Peridermium, Aecidium, Monosporidium, Roestelia, Caeoma, Uredo, Mapea). Vol. 4. Leipzig: Borntraeger. pp. 1–670.
