= Caeoma =

Scientific classification
- Kingdom: Fungi
- Division: Basidiomycota
- Class: Pucciniomycetes
- Order: Pucciniales
- Genus: Caeoma Link, 1809
- many, including: Caeoma dubium; Caeoma elegans; Caeoma elephantopi; Caeoma kaiku; Caeoma origani

Synonyms
- Hypodermium Link, 1816

Genus of fungi

Caeoma is a genus of rust fungi.
