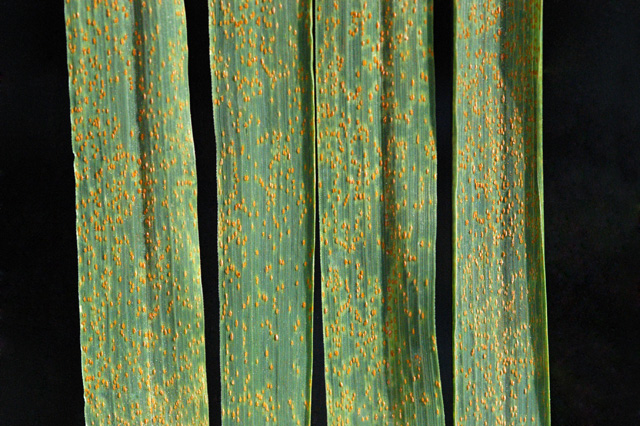
- Puccinia triticinia on wheat

Scientific classification
- Kingdom: Fungi
- Division: Basidiomycota
- Class: Pucciniomycetes
- Order: Pucciniales
- Family: Pucciniaceae
- Genus: Puccinia; Pers. (1801)

Type species
- Puccinia graminis Pers. (1794)

Species
- About 4000

= Puccinia =

Genus of rust fungi

Puccinia is a genus of fungi. All species in this genus are obligate plant pathogens and are known as rusts. The genus contains about 4,000 species.

The genus name of Puccinia is in honour of Tommaso Puccini (died 1735), who was an Italian doctor and botanist who taught anatomy at Hospital of Santa Maria Nuova in Florence.

The genus was circumscribed by Pier Antonio Micheli in Nov. Pl. Gen. on page 213 in 1729.

== Taxonomy ==
Examples of Puccinia rusts and the diseases they cause:

- Puccinia asparagi - Asparagus rust
- Puccinia evadens - Coyote brush rust
- Puccinia graminis - Stem rust, also known as black rust
- Puccinia horiana - Chrysanthemum white rust
- Puccinia libanotidis - Moon carrot rust
- Puccinia mariae-wilsoniae - Spring beauty rust
- Puccinia poarum - Coltsfoot rust gall
- Puccinia psidii - Guava rust or eucalyptus rust
- Puccinia recondita - Brown rust
- Puccinia sessilis - Arum rust and Ramsons rust
- Puccinia striiformis - Stripe rust, also known as yellow rust
- Puccinia triticina - Wheat leaf rust, also known as brown rust
- Puccinia punctiformis - Canada thistle rust

The rust species Puccinia obtegens has shown some promise for controlling Canada thistle, but it must be used in conjunction with other control measures to be effective.

Another leaf rust species, Puccinia myrsiphylli, has been used as an effective biocontrol agent for infestations of the common form of bridal creeper (Asparagus asparagoides) in Australia since 2000.
