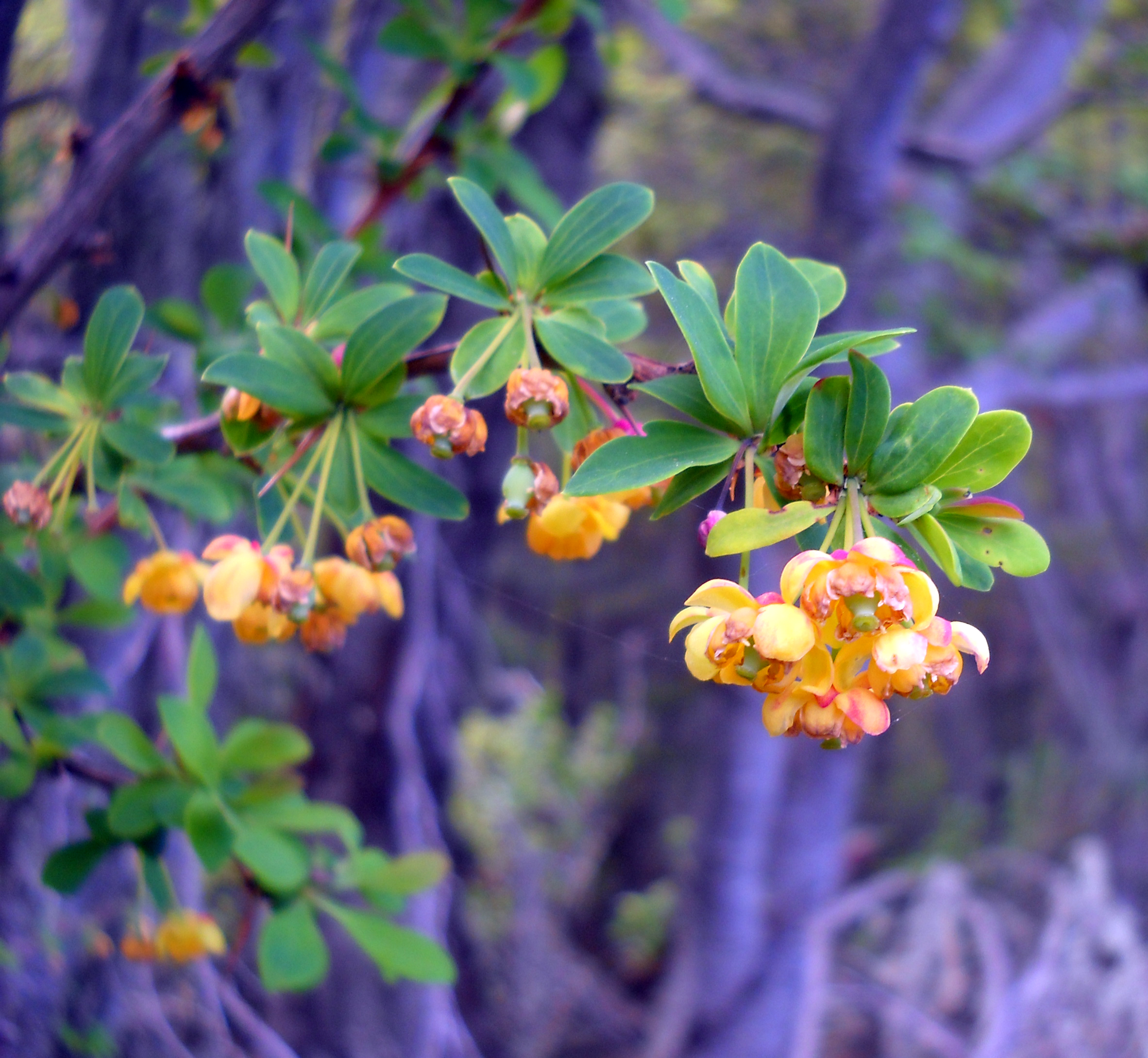
- Flowers
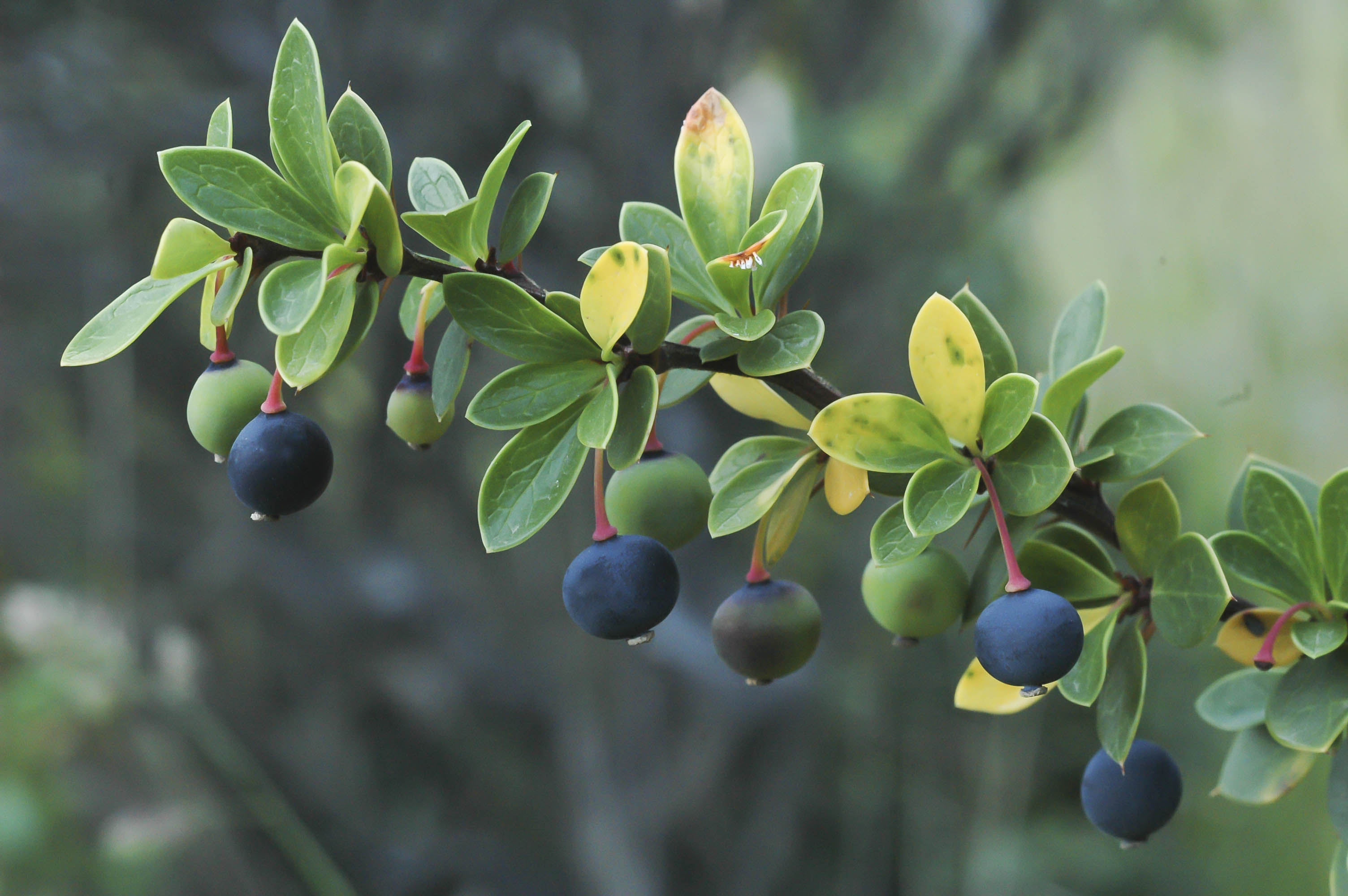
- Edible fruits

Scientific classification
- Kingdom: Plantae
- Clade: Tracheophytes
- Clade: Angiosperms
- Clade: Eudicots
- Order: Ranunculales
- Family: Berberidaceae
- Genus: Berberis
- Species: B. microphylla

Binomial name
- Berberis microphylla G. Forst. 1789

Synonyms
- Berberis antucoana C.K.Schneid.; Berberis barilochensis Job; Berberis buxifolia Lam.; Berberis cristata (Lam.) Lavallée; Berberis cuneata DC.; Berberis dulcis Sweet nom. illeg.; Berberis heterophylla Juss. ex Poir.; Berberis inermis Pers.; Berberis magellanica Dippel; Berberis marginata Gay; Berberis minor J.R.Forst. ex DC.; Berberis morenonis Kuntze; Berberis parodii Job; Berberis rotundifolia Lindl. nom. illeg.; Berberis spinosa Comm. ex Decne.; Berberis spinosissima (Reiche) Ahrendt; Berberis tricuspidata Sm. ex DC.

= Berberis microphylla =

Species of plant

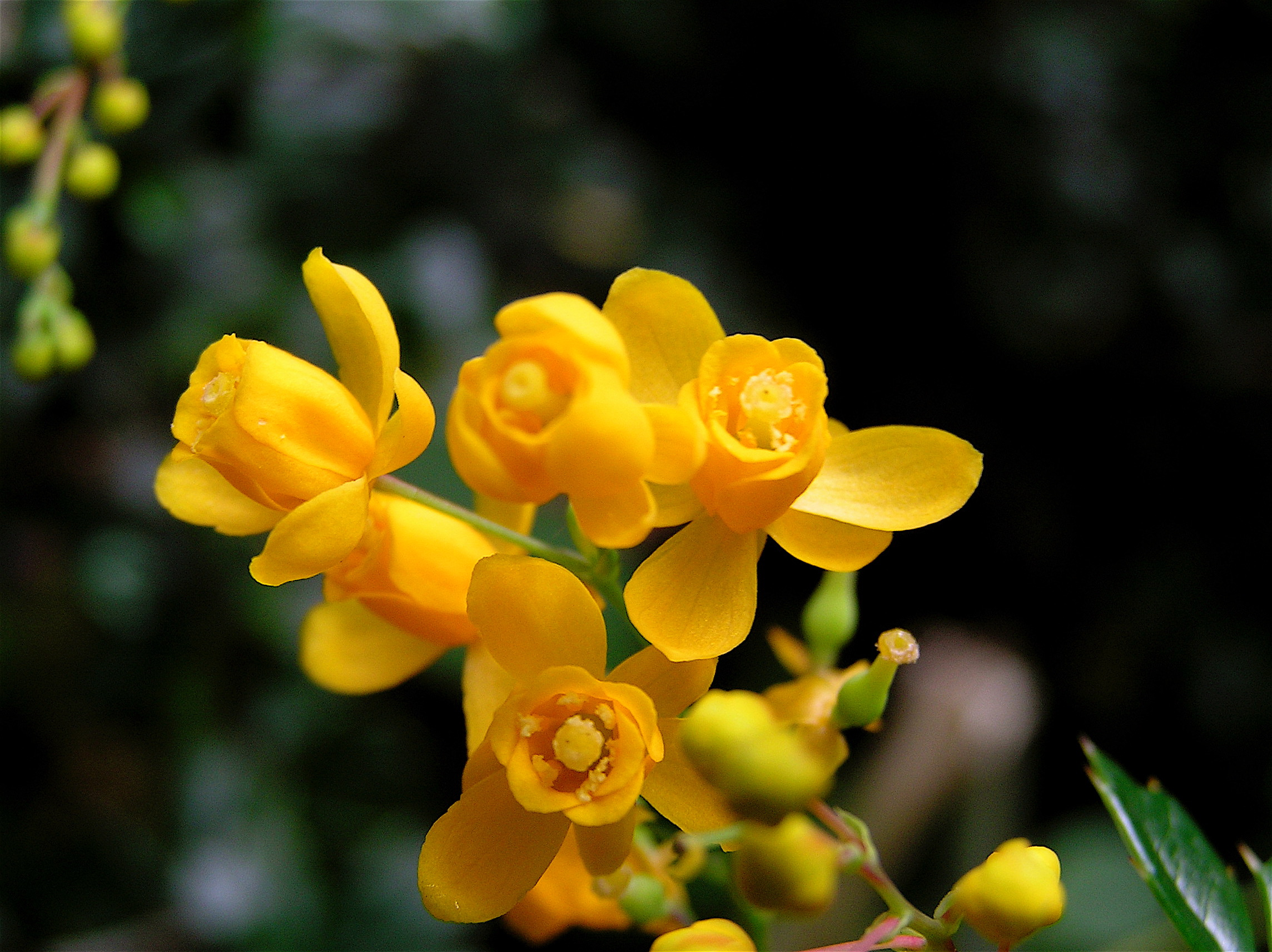
Calafate flower

Berberis microphylla, common name box-leaved barberry and Magellan barberry, in Spanish calafate and michay and other names, is an evergreen shrub, with simple, shiny box-like leaves. The calafate is native to southern Argentina and Chile and is a symbol of Patagonia. Berberis microphylla should not be confused with Mahonia microphylla, native to China.

== Description ==
The bush grows to a height of 1.0 to 1.5 m (3 ft 3 in to 4 ft 11 in). It has many arching branches, each covered in many tripartite spines. The bush has many small yellow flowers in summer. It produces blue-black berries.

== Uses ==
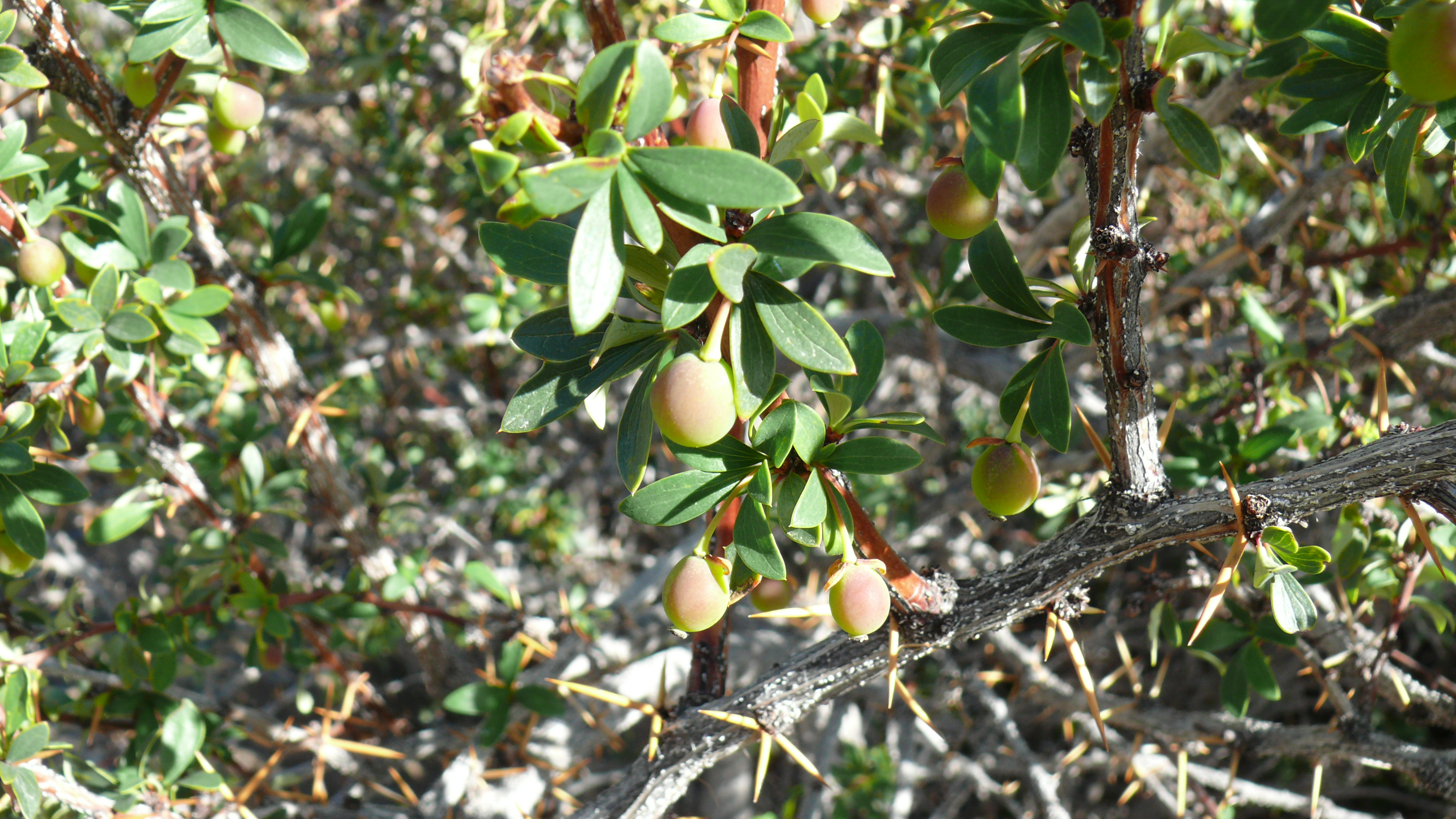
Fruits in spring

Its edible blue-black berries are harvested for jams, but are eaten fresh too - a legend tells that anyone who eats a calafate berry will be certain to return to Patagonia. It is also used as an additive in alcoholic beverages such as calafate beer.

The calafate is grown commercially for its fruit, potential medical uses and as a garden plant or bonsai. Its wood is used to make a red dye. The cultivar Berberis microphylla 'Nana' is widely available as a garden shrub, and is also used in commercial plantings as a low spiny hedge to discourage intruders, but it does not fruit.
