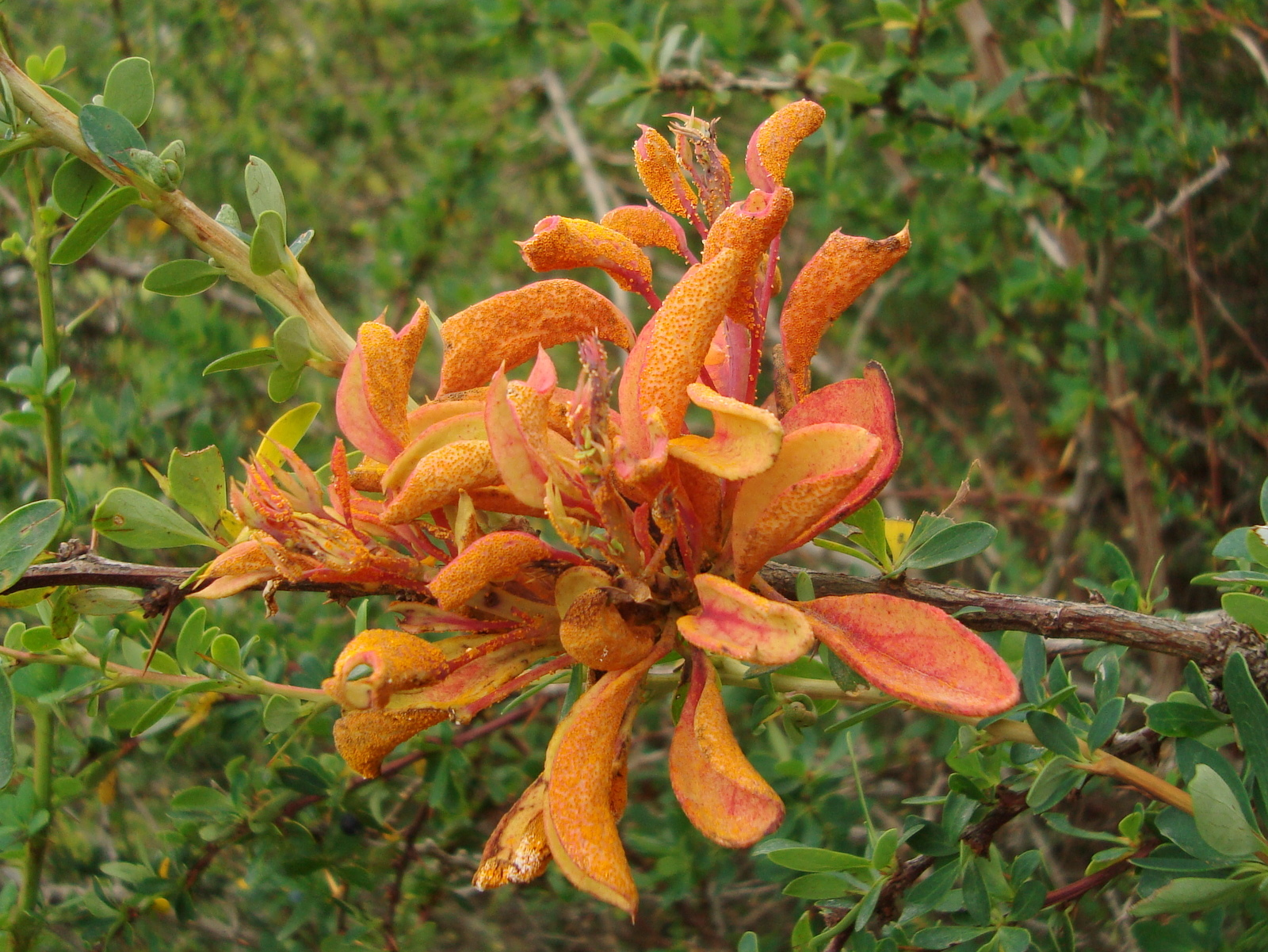
- Aecidium magellanicum growing on the bush Berberis microphylla

Scientific classification
- Domain: Eukaryota
- Kingdom: Fungi
- Division: Basidiomycota
- Class: Pucciniomycetes
- Order: Pucciniales
- Family: incertae sedis
- Genus: Aecidium

Type species
- Aecidium berberidis Pers. ex J.F.Gmel. (1792)

Synonyms
- Hypodermium subgen. Aecidium (Pers.) Link (1816); Symperidium Klotzsch (1843)

= Aecidium =

Genus of fungi

Aecidium is a genus of rust fungi in the order Pucciniales.

The widespread genus was estimated to contain about 600 species in 2008. As of 27 August 2023, the GBIF lists up to 947 species, while Species Fungorum lists about 816 species (out of 1251 records). About 800 species are accepted by Wijayawardene et al. 2020.

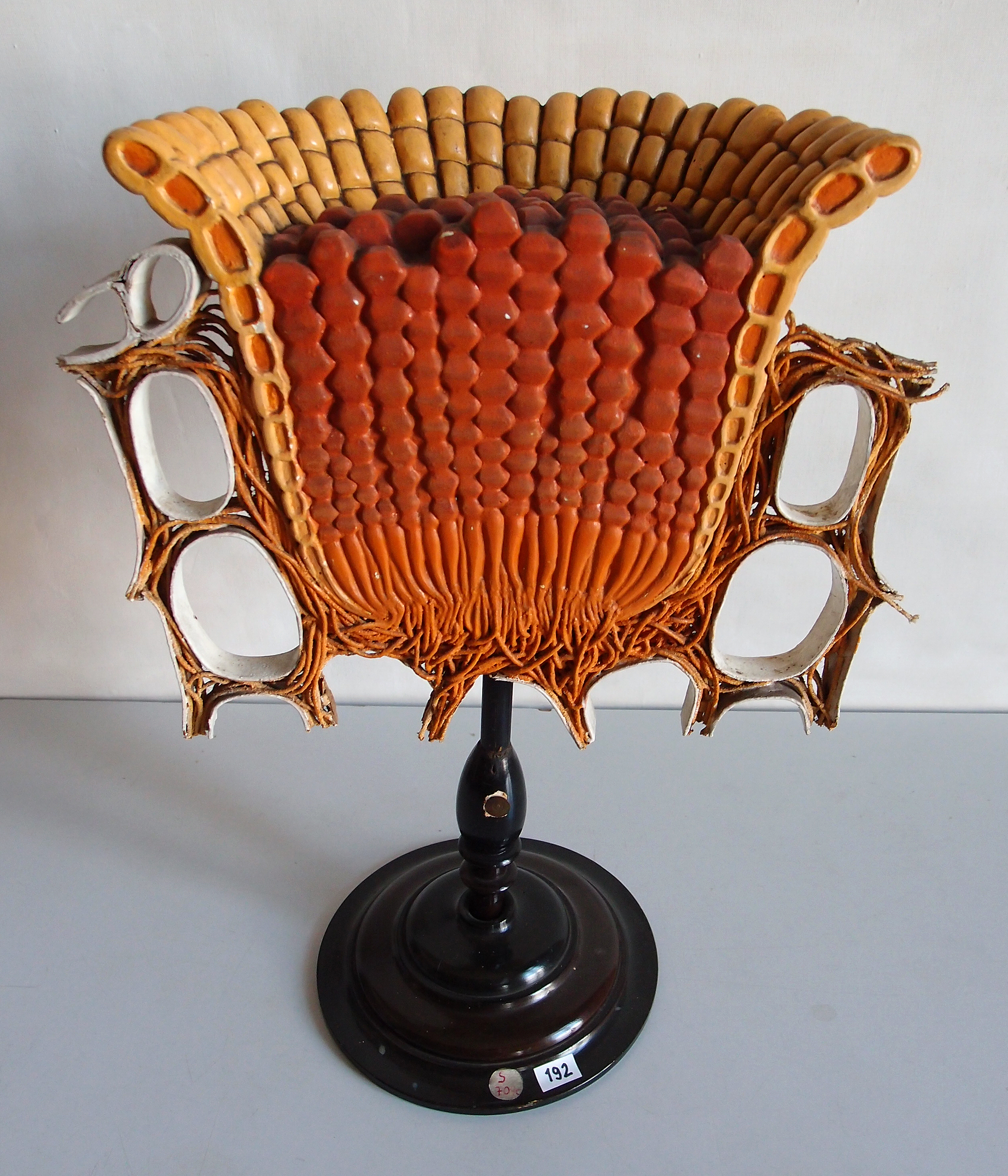
Model of Aecidium berberidis, Botanical Museum Greifswald

== Existence and occurrences ==
There have been 11737 occurrences of Aecidium. Though the genus can be found globally, it has been predominantly found in the USA and Europe.

== Selected species ==
- Aecidium abietis-mariesii
- Aecidium abscedens
- Aecidium acalyphae
- Aecidium acalyphae-ciliatae
- Aecidium acanthocarpi
- Aecidium acanthopanacis
- Aecidium aceris
- Aecidium achyrophori
- Aecidium aconiti-anthorae
- Aecidium aconiti-paniculati
- Aecidium aconiti-phragmitincolae
- Aecidium actinidiae
- Aecidium adenariae
- Aecidium adenophorae
- Aecidium adenophorae-verticillatae
- Aecidium adenostylis
- Aecidium adhatodae
- Aecidium adhatodicola
- Aecidium advectitium
- Aecidium aechmantherae
- Aecidium ageratinae
- Aecidium agnesiae
- Aecidium aikeni
- Aecidium alanthi
- Aecidium ajugae
- Aecidium akebiae
- Aecidium alangii
- Aecidium alaskanum
- Aecidium alaterni
- Aecidium albicans
- Aecidium albiceratum
- Aecidium alchorneae
- Aecidium alchorneae-rugosae
- Aecidium alibertiae
- Aecidium allii-ursini
- Aecidium alternantherae
- Aecidium amagense
- Aecidium amaryllidis
- Aecidium amazonense
- Aecidium ampliatum
- Aecidium anaphalidis-leptophyllae
- Aecidium anceps
- Aecidium ancundense
- Aecidium ancylanthi
- Aecidium andicola
- Aecidium anemarrhenae
- Aecidium anemones-silvestris
- Aecidium anningense
- Aecidium annonae
- Aecidium anograe
- Aecidium antherici
- Aecidium anthericicola
- Aecidium antholyzae
- Aecidium aphelandrae
- Aecidium aposeridis
- Aecidium approximans
- Aecidium araliae
- Aecidium archibaccharidis
- Aecidium arctoum
- Aecidium arcularium
- Aecidium arenariae
- Aecidium argyreiae-involucratae
- Aecidium argythamniae
- Aecidium ari
- Aecidium aridum
- Aecidium aristochiicola
- Aecidium artabotrydis
- Aecidium arunci
- Aecidium asarifolium
- Aecidium asparagacearum
- Aecidium asperulae-ciliatae
- Aecidium asphodeli
- Aecidium asphodeli-microcarpi
- Aecidium aspiliae
- Aecidium astrochlaenae
- Aecidium atriplicis
- Aecidium atroalbum
- Aecidium atrocrustaceum
- Aecidium avocense
- Aecidium baccharidis
- Aecidium baccharidophilum
- Aecidium breyniae
- Aecidium campanulastri G.W. Wilson (1911)
- Aecidium cannabis Szembel (1927)
- Aecidium caspicum Jacz. (1900)
- Aecidium magellanicum
- Aecidium narcissi
