= Paul Sydow =

German mycologist and lichenologist (1851–1925

Paul Sydow (1 November 1851 in Kallies – 26 February 1925 in Sophienstädt near Ruhlsdorf) was a German mycologist and lichenologist, father of Hans Sydow (1879–1946).

He worked as a schoolmaster in Berlin. With his son, Hans, he authored works involving descriptions of new species of ascomycetes, rusts and smuts. Paul Sydow was a prolific author (or co-author) of new fungal species, having formally described 2331 in his career. He also wrote about algae. He authored 252 works in five languages. Between 1880 and 1916 Sydow edited seven exsiccata series, among them Mycotheca Marchica (1880) with Friedrich Wilhelm Zopf as co-editor. With his son Hans Sydow he co-edited the first fascicles of the series Mycotheca Germanica (1903–1906).

== Works ==
- Paul Sydow: Die Flechten Deutschlands : Anleitung zur Kenntnis und Bestimmung der deutschen Flechten, 1887.
- Paul and Hans Sydow: Monographia Uredinearum : seu specierum omnium ad hunc usque diem cognitarum descriptio et adumbratio systematica, 1904–1924.
- Gustav Lindau and Paul Sydow: Thesaurus literaturae mycologicae et lichenologicae. (1908–1917, 5 volumes).

He also made contributions to volume 12 of Pier Andrea Saccardo's Sylloge fungorum omnium hucusque cognitorum, 1897, as well as volume 11 of his Annales Mycologici.

== Honours ==
Several taxa of fungi were named in his honour, including;

- Sydowia (family Dothioraceae) by Bres. in 1895
- Sydowiellina (family Schizothyriaceae) by Bat. & I.H.Lima in 1959 (named after father and son, Sydow)

== See also ==
- Category:Taxa named by Paul Sydow
