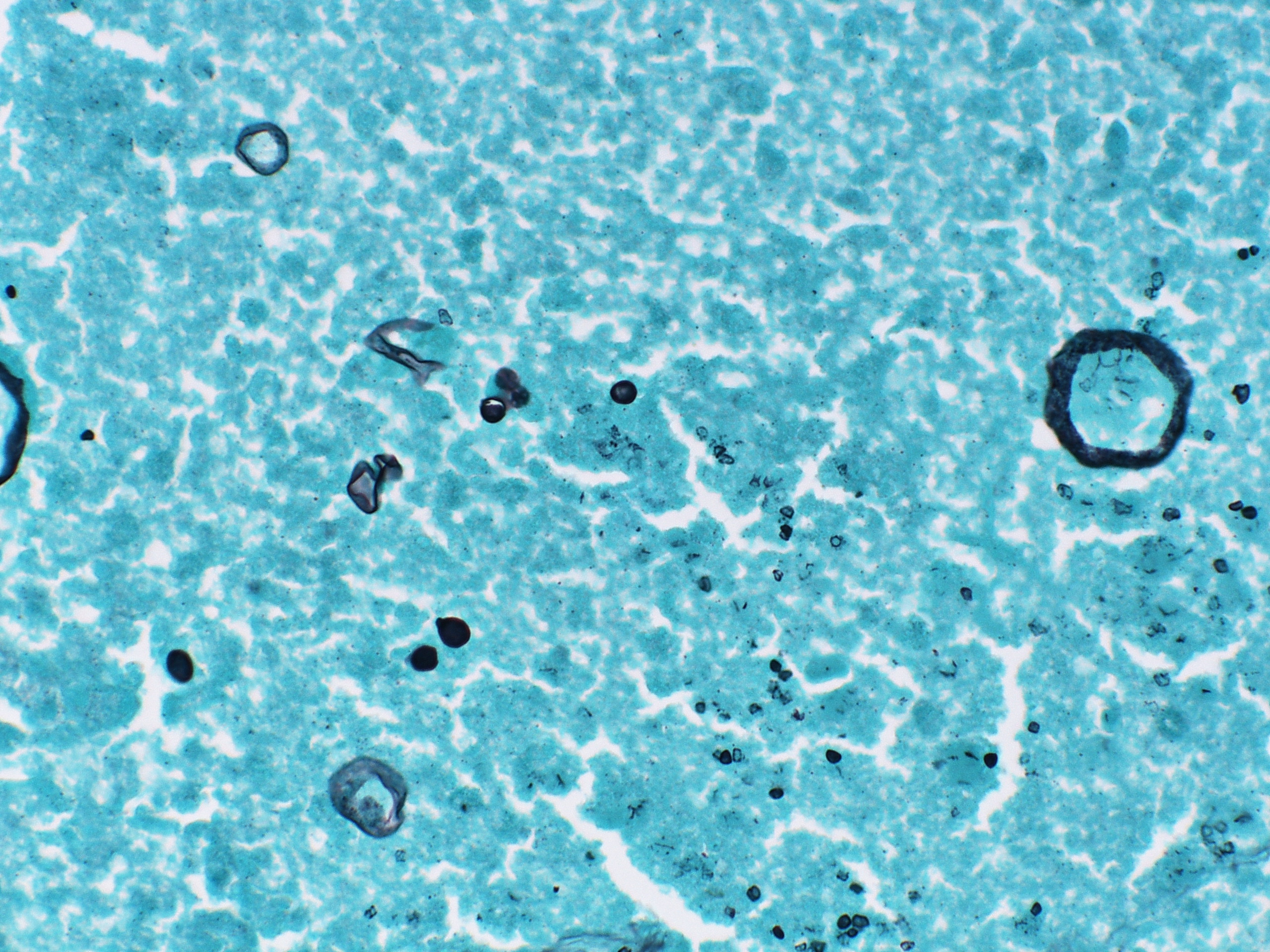
- Multiple large ruptured spherules that are devoid of endospores and are in various phases of degeneration. Free endospores are also present

Scientific classification
- Kingdom: Fungi
- Division: Ascomycota
- Class: Dothideomycetes
- Subclass: incertae sedis
- Family: Coccoideaceae; P. Henn. ex Sacc. & D. Sacc.

Type genus
- Coccoidea Henn.

= Coccoideaceae =

Family of fungi

The Coccoideaceae are a family of fungi with an uncertain taxonomic placement in the class Dothideomycetes.

The Family Coccoideaceae includes the following:

- Genera:
  - Coccodiscus
  - Coccodothella
  - Coccoidea
  - Coccoidella
  - Dianesea
