= Dianesea =

Scientific classification
- Kingdom: Fungi
- Division: Ascomycota
- Class: Dothideomycetes
- Family: Coccoideaceae
- Genus: Dianesea; Inácio & P.F. Cannon

Type species
- Dianesea palmae (F. Stevens) Inácio & P.F. Cannon

Genus of fungi

Dianesea is a genus of fungi in the class Dothideomycetes. The relationship of this taxon to other taxa within the class is unknown (incertae sedis). A monotypic genus, it contains the single species Dianesea palmae.

== See also ==
- List of Dothideomycetes genera incertae sedis
