= Aplanocalenia =

Scientific classification
- Kingdom: Fungi
- Division: Ascomycota
- Class: Lecanoromycetes
- Order: Graphidales
- Family: Gomphillaceae
- Genus: Aplanocalenia; Lücking, Sérus. & Vězda (2005)
- Species: A. inconspicua

Binomial name
- Aplanocalenia inconspicua (Müll.Arg.) Lücking, Sérus. & Vězda (2005)

Synonyms
- Heterothecium inconspicuum Müll.Arg. (1890); Lopadium inconspicuum (Müll.Arg.) Zahlbr. (1926); Calenia inconspicua (Müll.Arg.) R.Sant. & Lücking (1999)

Single-species fungal genus

Aplanocalenia is a fungal genus in the family Gomphillaceae. It was segregated from Calenia in 2005 on morphological grounds; its sole species is Aplanocalenia inconspicua, a foliicolous (leaf-dwelling) lichen. The genus is distinguished by tiny, translucent fruiting bodies that are immersed in the thallus and lack a prominent margin, and by a smooth, pale thallus without the conspicuous surface crystals common in many related foliicolous lichens.

== Taxonomy ==
Aplanocalenia was circumscribed in 2005 by Robert Lücking, Emmanuël Sérusiaux and Antonín Vězda, who also made the new combination Aplanocalenia inconspicua for a species previously known as Heterothecium inconspicuum (later treated in Calenia). They erected the genus to accommodate material with fruiting bodies (apothecia) that are completely immersed, applanate (flattened) and translucent, lacking the prominent thalline rim seen in Calenia. In their family-wide cladistic treatment of the family Gomphillaceae, Aplanocalenia was placed among the mainly leaf-dwelling (foliicolous genera with immersed/zeorine-type apothecia (e.g. Calenia, Caleniopsis, Aulaxina), but was kept separate because of this distinctive apothecial form; hyphophores (the family's specialised asexual propagule-bearing structures) have not been observed in the type species. The authors noted the possibility that additional, closely similar taxa might exist, differing only in ascospore septation, but at the time treated Aplanocalenia as centred on A. inconspicua.

== Description ==
The thallus is foliicolous (growing on living leaves), extremely thin and smooth, and described as pale greenish-grey; unlike many members of the family, it lacks a coarse, crystalline (calcium oxalate) incrustation that gives a granular aspect to the surface. The sexual fruit bodies (apothecia) are very small, remain immersed in the thallus, and present a flattened, translucent disc with little to no raised margin—features that make them inconspicuous under a hand lens. In Gomphillaceae terms, the apothecia lack a conspicuous algiferous thalline rim; the proper margin is greatly reduced. Hyphophores (setiform or squamiform propagule-bearing structures) have not been documented for the genus. Ascospore details in the original material are scant, and the authors cautioned that the type was depauperate; they also pointed out that slight differences in ascospore septation may occur among similar material.

== Habitat and distribution ==
Like most genera in its part of Gomphillaceae, Aplanocalenia is confined to leaf surfaces in humid, tropical to subtropical forests. The family overview associates these foliicolous lineages chiefly with lowland to lower montane environments, where they form thin films on the upper surface of evergreen leaves. Aplanocalenia is one of the almost exclusively foliicolous genera of the family; its precise geographic range is not fully known, but the ecology and material examined indicate tropical habitats.
