= Paratricharia =

Scientific classification
- Domain: Eukaryota
- Kingdom: Fungi
- Division: Ascomycota
- Class: Lecanoromycetes
- Order: Graphidales
- Family: Gomphillaceae
- Genus: Paratricharia; Lücking (1997)
- Species: P. paradoxa

Binomial name
- Paratricharia paradoxa (Lücking) Lücking (1997)

Synonyms
- Tricharia paradoxa Lücking (1991)

Single-species fungal genus

Paratricharia is a single-species fungal genus in the family Gomphillaceae. It is monotypic, containing the single species Paratricharia paradoxa, a foliicolous (leaf-dwelling) lichen. A two-gene molecular study published in 2024 showed that the genus sits in the Aulaxina clade and forms a strongly supported sister lineage to Caleniopsis, well away from Tricharia and the other "black-setae" genera Microxyphiomyces and Santricharia.

== Taxonomy ==
Costa Rican material bearing robust, sterile black bristles (setae) was first described in 1991 as Tricharia paradoxa. Subsequent work recognised that its apothecia—tiny, disc-shaped spore-producing structures with a carbonised margin—and a unique sterile column (columella) in the centre of each disc did not match Tricharia, prompting Robert Lücking to erect the new genus Paratricharia in 1997.

Until recently the genus had not been sequenced, and its placement relied on morphology. Newly generated mitochondrial (mtSSU) and nuclear ribosomal (nuLSU) DNA sequences resolved Paratricharia as sister to Caleniopsis; together these genera form the earliest branch within a wider Aulaxina clade that also contains Aulaxina and Aulaxinella. The study rejected any close relationship with Tricharia despite the shared presence of long black setae, confirming that these bristles have evolved several times independently inside Gomphillaceae.

== Description ==
The thallus (lichen body) forms a thin, pale green film on living leaves in humid tropical forests. From it arise two conspicuous features. First are the carbon-black, hair-like setae—sterile, thick-walled bristles up to several millimetres long that give the colony a spiky appearance. Second are the minute blackish brown apothecia. Each apothecium has a heavily carbonised, slightly raised rim (a zeorine margin) and encloses a central sterile column (columella), an uncommon feature within the family. The combination of setae and carbonised apothecia is diagnostic among foliicolous lichens.

== Distribution and ecology ==
All confirmed collections come from lowland rainforests of Costa Rica, where the lichen grows on the upper surfaces of evergreen leaves. Like many foliicolous species it is thought to rely on frequent rainfall and high humidity for growth and spore dispersal.
