= Caleniella =

Scientific classification
- Domain: Eukaryota
- Kingdom: Fungi
- Division: Ascomycota
- Class: Lecanoromycetes
- Order: Graphidales
- Family: Gomphillaceae
- Genus: Caleniella; Xavier-Leite, M.Cáceres & Lücking (2023)

Type species
- Caleniella triseptata (Zahlbr.) Xavier-Leite, M.Cáceres & Lücking (2023)

Species
- C. maculans C. triseptata

Genus of lichens

Caleniella is a small genus of fungi in the family Gomphillaceae. It comprises two species of leaf-dwelling lichens.

== Taxonomy ==
The genus was circumscribed in 2023 by the lichenologists Amanda Xavier-Leite, Marcela Cáceres, and Robert Lücking. The name derives from the genus Calenia, where its species were previously classified, with a diminutive suffix (-iella) alluding to the relatively small size of its reproductive structures. The type species of the genus is Caleniella triseptata, which was originally described as Calenia triseptata in 1909. Molecular studies have shown that while Caleniella is related to the genera Caleniopsis and Aulaxina, it is distinct enough to warrant its own genus. The main feature distinguishing it from true Calenia species is its small spores with three cross-walls.

== Description ==
These lichens grow on living leaves, forming a continuous layer on the leaf surface. Their most distinctive features are their reproductive structures (apothecia), which protrude from the surface and have a cup-like appearance similar to those found in the genus Calenia. These structures are pale in colour with a prominent white outer rim (thalline margin) and a less distinct inner margin.

Under the microscope, these lichens show several clear layers of tightly packed, parallel fungal threads. Each reproductive structure typically contains eight ascospores, each divided into four cells by three cross-walls (septa). Unlike many related genera, no specialised reproductive structures called hyphophores have been observed in Caleniella.

== Species ==
- Caleniella maculans (Vain.) Xavier-Leite, M.Cáceres & Lücking (2023)
- Caleniella triseptata (Zahlbr.) Xavier-Leite, M.Cáceres & Lücking (2023)
