= Monocalenia =

Scientific classification
- Kingdom: Fungi
- Division: Ascomycota
- Class: Lecanoromycetes
- Order: Graphidales
- Family: Gomphillaceae
- Genus: Monocalenia; Xavier-Leite, M.Cáceres & Lücking (2023)
- Species: M. monospora

Binomial name
- Monocalenia monospora (Vězda) Xavier-Leite, M.Cáceres & Lücking (2023)

Synonyms
- Calenia monospora Vězda (1979)

Genus of lichens

Monocalenia is a fungal genus in the family Gomphillaceae. It comprises the single species Monocalenia monospora, a leaf-dwelling lichen that occurs in Guinea and the Galápagos Islands.

== Taxonomy ==
Genus Monocalenia contains a single species, Monocalenia monospora, which was originally described as Calenia monospora by the Czech lichenologist Antonín Vězda in 1979. The species was later transferred to its own genus by Amanda Xavier-Leite, Marcela Cáceres, and Robert Lücking in 2023 based on molecular phylogenetics analysis that showed it was unrelated to Calenia in the strict sense and instead allied with Asterothyrium. The genus is of several segregates from the historically broad concept of Calenia that were recognised following modern molecular systematic studies of the Gomphillaceae.

The genus name combines "Calenia" (the original genus) with a reference to the distinctive single-spored asci that characterise the species. Monocalenia is distinguished by its smooth thallus lacking setae, erumpent and zeorine apothecia with pruinose discs containing epithecial algae, and unusual single muriform ascospores. While some morphologically similar species exist (like Calenia lueckingii), molecular evidence supports Monocalenia's placement as a separate genus based on its unique combination of characters and phylogenetic position.

== Description ==
Monocalenia monospora forms a continuous growth (thallus) on living leaves as a foliicolous lichen. The thallus has a smooth surface and lacks hair-like projections (setae) that are common in related genera. Its most distinctive features are its reproductive structures (apothecia), which emerge from beneath the thallus surface (erumpent) and have a powdery white coating (pruina) on their spore-producing disc.

The apothecia have two distinct parts: an inner proper margin and an outer thalline margin derived from the main body of the lichen. What makes these structures particularly unique is the presence of symbiotic algal cells embedded within the upper layer (epithecium) of the apothecia – a feature rare among related lichens. The fungal partner produces just a single large spore per reproductive sac (ascus), rather than the multiple spores typical in most lichens. These spores are divided into many compartments by both vertical and horizontal septa (muriform).

The species also produces specialized reproductive structures called hyphophores, which are pale and bristle-like. These structures bear chains of fungal cells (diahyphae) with distinctive spindle-shaped segments. While some other species in the family share individual features with Monocalenia, this particular combination of characteristics – especially the single-spored asci and presence of algal cells in the apothecia – sets it apart as a distinct genus.

== Habitat and distribution ==
Monocalenia monospora is from the type locality in the Republic of Guinea (West Africa) at Macenta, Ziama Massif, Sérédou, at an elevation of 900 m (3,000 ft) above sea level. It has also been recorded from the Galápagos Islands (Ecuador) on Isla Santa Cruz in the upper moist zone above Bella Vista at 600 m (2,000 ft) elevation, where it was found growing on Malcolmia leaves. This indicates the species can grow as an epiphyllous lichen (growing on living leaves) in both African and South American tropical montane forests.
