= Spinomyces =

Scientific classification
- Domain: Eukaryota
- Kingdom: Fungi
- Division: Ascomycota
- Class: Lecanoromycetes
- Order: Graphidales
- Family: Gomphillaceae
- Genus: Spinomyces; Bat. & Peres ex Xavier-Leite, M.Cáceres & Lücking (2023)

Type species
- Spinomyces albostrigosus (R.Sant.) Xavier-Leite, Cáceres & Lücking (2023)

Species
- S. aggregatus S. albostrigosus S. deslooveri S. guatemalensis S. microcarpus S. verrucosus

Synonyms
- Spinomyces Bat. & Peres (1961)

Genus of lichens

Spinomyces is a genus of fungi in the family Gomphillaceae. It has six species of leaf-dwelling lichens.

== Taxonomy ==
The genus name Spinomyces has a complex taxonomic history. In 1961, the mycologists Augusto Chaves Batista and Generosa Emília Pontual Peres first proposed the name Spinomyces, using a specimen they called S. genipae. However, when scientists later examined this original specimen, they discovered it was actually a mixture of two different lichens – one that appeared to be Tricharia albostrigosa (without reproductive structures) and another species of Echinoplaca. Because Batista and Peres published the name without providing a formal scientific description as required by naming rules, Spinomyces was not considered a valid genus name at that time.

In 2023, when the lichenologists Amanda Xavier-Leite, Marcela Cáceres, and Robert Lücking needed a name for a newly recognised group of lichens centred around what was then called Aderkomyces albostrigosus, they decided to resurrect and formally validate the name Spinomyces. Rather than basing it on the mixed-up Echinoplaca specimen as had been previously suggested by some researchers in 1998, they chose to establish the genus with Tricharia albostrigosa (now Spinomyces albostrigosus) as its type species.

== Description ==
These lichens form a continuous, smooth layer on leaf surfaces, characterised by distinctive white bristles. Their reproductive structures (apothecia) sit directly on the surface and typically range in colour from yellowish to reddish-brown. Under the microscope, these structures usually produce single spores that are divided into multiple compartments both lengthwise and crosswise (muriform).

A characteristic feature of the genus is its specialised reproductive structures (hyphophores), which are white bristles that often widen at their tips. These structures produce chains of spindle-shaped cells (diahyphae) at their tips.

== Species ==
- Spinomyces aggregatus (Lücking) Xavier-Leite, M.Cáceres & Lücking (2023)
- Spinomyces albostrigosus (R.Sant.) Xavier-Leite, Cáceres & Lücking (2023)
- Spinomyces deslooveri (Sérus.) Xavier-Leite, M.Cáceres & Lücking (2023)
- Spinomyces guatemalensis (Lücking & Barillas) Xavier-Leite, M.Cáceres & Lücking (2023)
- Spinomyces microcarpus (Etayo & Lücking) Xavier-Leite, M.Cáceres & Lücking (2023)
- Spinomyces verrucosus (Sérus.) Xavier-Leite, M.Cáceres & Lücking (2023)
