= Pseudocalenia =

Scientific classification
- Domain: Eukaryota
- Kingdom: Fungi
- Division: Ascomycota
- Class: Lecanoromycetes
- Order: Graphidales
- Family: Gomphillaceae
- Genus: Pseudocalenia; Xavier-Leite, M.Cáceres & Lücking (2023)
- Species: P. solorinoides

Binomial name
- Pseudocalenia solorinoides (Lücking) Xavier-Leite, M.Cáceres & Lücking (2023)

Synonyms
- Calenia solorinoides Lücking (1991)

Genus of lichens

Pseudocalenia is a fungal genus in the family Gomphillaceae. It comprises the single species Pseudocalenia solorinoides, found in Costa Rica.

== Taxonomy ==
Pseudocalenia was circumscribed in 2023 by Amanda Xavier-Leite, Marcela Cáceres, and Robert Lücking to accommodate the species Pseudocalenia solorinoides, which was previously classified in the genus Calenia. Molecular phylogenetics studies demonstrated that P. solorinoides was not closely related to true Calenia species, but instead showed closer affinities to the morphologically distinct genera Roselviria and Santricharia. The genus name alludes to its previous classification in Calenia.

While the immersed apothecial structure of Pseudocalenia bears superficial resemblance to some other species like Calenia bullatinoides and Bullatina aspidota, molecular evidence indicates these similarities evolved independently multiple times within the Gomphillaceae rather than indicating close relationships.

== Description ==
Pseudocalenia is a foliicolous lichen, meaning it grows on living leaves. The fungal body (thallus) appears scattered or dispersed rather than forming a continuous coating, with distinctive swollen, bubble-like patches that rise up from the leaf surface. Unlike many related lichens, Pseudocalenia lacks the hair-like projections called sterile setae on its surface.

The reproductive structures (apothecia) are completely immersed within these raised thallus patches, giving them a sunken appearance. These structures lack a proper margin, with the surrounding thallus tissue effectively serving as their border. The excipulum comprises tightly packed, parallel fungal threads (hyphae) and appears colourless under the microscope.

The species produces specialised reproductive structures called hyphophores, which are short, bristle-like projections that emerge from the margins of the thallus patches. These hyphophores are primarily white but develop distinctive blackened tips. They produce specialised fungal threads called diahyphae, which have characteristic terminal segments that are either spindle-shaped (fusiform) or club-shaped (clavate).

A unique feature of P. solorinoides is that it produces just a single ascospore per reproductive sac (ascus), rather than the multiple spores typical of many lichens. These spores are muriform, meaning they are divided by both vertical and horizontal walls into multiple compartments, creating a brick wall-like appearance when viewed under magnification.

== Distribution ==
The holotype of Pseudocalenia solorinoides (then classified in Calenia) was collected in Costa Rica.
