= Psathyromyces =

Scientific classification
- Kingdom: Fungi
- Division: Ascomycota
- Class: Lecanoromycetes
- Order: Graphidales
- Family: Gomphillaceae
- Genus: Psathyromyces; Bat. & Peres (1964)

Type species
- Psathyromyces heterellus (Stirt.) Xavier-Leite, M.Cáceres & Lücking (2022)

Species
- P. heterellus P. planus

Genus of lichens

Psathyromyces is a small genus of lichen-forming fungi in the family Gomphillaceae. The genus was originally proposed in 1964 by Augusto Chaves Batista and Generosa Emília Pontual Peres, but was later transferred to other genera before being reinstated in 2023 based on molecular studies. These are distinctive lichens that grow exclusively on living leaves in tropical rainforests, characterised by their smooth surfaces decorated with conspicuous white bristles, bright orange fruiting bodies, and unique pin-like structures with black arrow-shaped tips. The genus is known only from northern South America, with two described species found in the Amazon region and Guiana Shield.

== Taxonomy ==
Psathyromyces was erected by Augusto Chaves Batista and Generosa Emília Pontual Peres in proceedings of the 1963 Brazilian Botanical Society congress and formally published the following year. Their protologue centred on P. rosacearum, a foliicolous lichen from Amazonian Brazil; subsequent nomenclatural work showed that fungus to be conspecific with Stirton's earlier Arthonia heterella, so the current type species is treated as Psathyromyces heterellus. During the latter half of the twentieth century the genus name fell out of use: first it was transferred to Echinoplaca, then to Tricharia, and finally to Aderkomyces as part of the so-called Aderkomyces heterellus aggregate. Xavier-Leite and co-workers' two-locus phylogeny demonstrated that this aggregate is only distantly related to Aderkomyces sensu stricto, prompting them to resurrect Psathyromyces for the clade and to provide the necessary new combinations (including P. planus for Antonín Vězda's Tricharia plana).

The reinstated genus sits within the family Gomphillaceae (order Graphidales) and is readily delimited by a smooth, continuous thallus studded with conspicuous white, arrow-tipped setae; orange, applanate biatorine apothecia; small muriform ascospores; and exceptionally long, white hyphophores whose blackened tips bear moniliform chains of diaspores. This character suite—especially the bright apothecial discs and the styliform hyphophores—separates Psathyromyces from superficially similar foliicolous genera such as Aderkomyces and Tricharia. Two described species (P. heterellus and P. planus) are placed in the genus; molecular data hint at at least one additional, as-yet undescribed taxon from Amazonia, so the circumscription is expected to broaden as further material is sequenced.

== Description ==
Psathyromyces forms a thin, continuous thallus that hugs the surface of evergreen leaves. The cortex is smooth and pale grey-green, interrupted by an even lawn of erect, sterile setae. These setae are white from base to near the tip, where they may shade very slightly, and are finer but markedly longer than the stiff black bristles typical of many other Gomphillaceae.

Flat, biatorine fruiting bodies apothecia are scattered across the thallus. They sit flush with the surface (applanate) and have vivid orange to ochre discs that contrast sharply with the paler rim and surrounding white hairs. Internally the excipulum is colourless and the asci contain eight ellipsoid-shaped ascospores that mature into small, brick-walled (muriform) packages before discharge.

The genus's most distinctive feature is its asexual apparatus. From the thallus arise very long, pin-like hyphophores that remain white along the shaft but terminate abruptly in a minute, jet-black, arrow-shaped head. These "flagpoles" bear chains of bead-like cells (moniliform diaphyphae) that break apart as vegetative diaspores, ensuring local dispersal when conditions are too wet for effective spore release. The combination of smooth thallus, white setae, orange discs and arrow-tipped hyphophores makes Psathyromyces readily recognisable in the field.

== Habitat and distribution ==
Psathyromyces is restricted to humid, lowland Neotropical rainforest where it grows exclusively on the smooth surfaces of living evergreen leaves. The lichen's thin, adherent thallus and conspicuous white setae are adapted to the shaded understory microclimate: leaves 1–3 m above the ground that remain damp but well-aerated. Colonies are never recorded on bark, rock or pioneer vegetation, reinforcing their status as obligate foliicolous specialists.

Confirmed collections come from northern Amazonia and the Guiana Shield, with two described species—P. heterellus and P. planus—and molecular evidence hinting at an additional, unnamed taxon from the same region. No verified records exist outside South America, but the prevalence of similar habitats in adjacent Central American and Andean forests suggests the genus is merely under-collected there. Further targeted surveys are expected to extend its known range and reveal greater species diversity within this strictly Neotropical lineage.

== Species ==
- Psathyromyces heterellus (Stirt.) Xavier-Leite, M.Cáceres & Lücking (2023)
- Psathyromyces planus (Vězda) Xavier-Leite, M.Cáceres & Lücking (2023)
