= Lithogyalideopsis =

Scientific classification
- Kingdom: Fungi
- Division: Ascomycota
- Class: Lecanoromycetes
- Order: Graphidales
- Family: Gomphillaceae
- Genus: Lithogyalideopsis; Lücking, Sérus. & Vězda (2005)

Type species
- Lithogyalideopsis poeltii (Vězda) Lücking, Sérus. & Vězda (2005)

Species
- L. aterrima L. poeltii L. vivantii L. zelandica

Genus of lichens

Lithogyalideopsis is a genus of lichen-forming fungi in the family Gomphillaceae. It comprises four rock-dwelling, crust-forming lichens that adhere tightly to siliceous rock in temperate to montane habitats. The genus was established in 2005 when these rock-dwelling species were separated from a related group based on their distinctive reproductive structures. These lichens are characterized by jet-black fruiting discs and unique bristle-like structures that release thread bundles for reproduction, resembling tiny chimney brushes.

== Taxonomy ==
Lithogyalideopsis was circumscribed in 2005 by the lichenologists Robert Lücking, Emmanuël Sérusiaux and Antonín Vězda as part of their major revision of the family Gomphillaceae. They segregated four rock-dwelling (saxicolous) members of the Gyalideopsis aterrima species complex into a separate genus because those lichens share a distinctive Aulaxina-type hyphophore—a minute bristle that releases bundles of propagules (diahyphae). In Lithogyalideopsis the hyphophore is black, needle-like and finishes in a small, hand-shaped (palmate) spray of threads; this architecture differs from the flabellate or simpler setae seen in Gyalideopsis (in the strict sense). Lithogyalideopsis is further characterised by dark, rim-less (lecideine) apothecia and relatively small, transversely-septate spores, features that together mark it out from its parent lineage.

The type species is Lithogyalideopsis poeltii (originally described as Gyalideopsis poeltii). All species are confined to mineral substrates, often damp siliceous rock, and share the almost coal-black fruiting bodies that inspired the generic name (litho- = 'stone').

== Description ==
The thallus of Lithogyalideopsis species is thin, inconspicuous and grey-green to blackish, lacking any erect sterile hairs (setae) that occur in some relatives. Because these species live on bare rock (they are saxicolous rather than leaf-dwelling) the surface is usually matt and finely cracked, without the crystalline sheen common in many foliicolous members of the family. Cells of the green algal photobiont are dispersed through a largely undifferentiated fungal layer, so the thallus has no real cortex.

Sexual structures (apothecia) are minute, circular to slightly irregular discs that sit directly on the thallus. They appear jet-black even when wet and have a true fungal margin (true exciple) but no rim derived from thallus tissue (thalline margin); this margin type is termed lecideine. The proper exciple extends only a short distance below the disc, and the hymenium produces eight very small, colourless ascospores divided by a few transverse walls (septa).

A distinctive diagnostic character is the genus' asexual propagules, or hyphophores. These are stiff, bristle-like black stalks (up to about 1 mm high) whose tip flares into a tiny palmate fan; from that fan radiate 3–5 repeatedly branched threads called diahyphae. The whole apparatus resembles a miniature chimney-brush and releases bundles of hyphae that can start new lichens when they land on suitable rock. This Aulaxina-type hyphophore, together with the black lecideine apothecia and small spores, sets Lithogyalideopsis apart from its parent genus Gyalideopsis.

== Habitat and distribution ==
Lithogyalideopsis is confined to bare rock: every species in the genus is saxicolous, growing as a thin, crustose film on hard, usually siliceous surfaces and producing blackish, lecideine apothecia directly from the stone. Unlike the predominantly leaf-inhabiting members of the family Gomphillaceae, Lithogyalideopsis belongs to a small, non-foliicolous contingent that favours cool, moist rock faces in temperate or tropical-montane belts, with collections extending upward into upper-montane and occasionally subalpine zones where constant humidity prevails.

== Species ==
Species Fungorum accepts four species of Lithogyalideopsis:

- Lithogyalideopsis aterrima (Vězda & Poelt) Lücking, Sérus. & Vězda (2005)
- Lithogyalideopsis poeltii (Vězda) Lücking, Sérus. & Vězda (2005)
- Lithogyalideopsis vivantii (Sérus.) Lücking, Sérus. & Vězda (2005)
- Lithogyalideopsis zelandica (Vězda & Malcolm) Lücking, Sérus. & Vězda (2005)
