= Actinoplaca =

Scientific classification
- Kingdom: Fungi
- Division: Ascomycota
- Class: Lecanoromycetes
- Order: Graphidales
- Family: Gomphillaceae
- Genus: Actinoplaca; Müll.Arg. (1891)

Type species
- Actinoplaca strigulacea Müll.Arg. (1891)

Species
- A. balboana A. gemmifera A. strigulacea

Genus of lichen-forming fungi

Actinoplaca is a small genus of lichen-forming fungi in the family Gomphillaceae. The genus is foliicolous, meaning its species grow on the surface of living leaves in humid tropical forests, and has been recorded from Central and South America and tropical Africa. The genus produces distinctive spherical structures on the thallus surface, now understood to be a type of asexual reproductive structure called hyphophores, which were among the first such structures ever described in lichens.

== Taxonomy ==
The genus was proposed in 1891 by the Swiss lichenologist Johannes Müller Argoviensis. In his protologue, Müller Argoviensis described Actinoplaca as a new genus and treated it as distinctive enough to warrant its own tribe (Actinoplaceae). He characterized it as a crustose lichen, with a crust-like thallus tightly attached to the substrate and becomes radially placodioid towards the edge (that is, developing a radiating, lobed margin). The photobiont cells ("gonidia" in the protologue) were described as green and spherical (globose), and the sexual fruiting bodies (apothecia) as open (gymnocarpic): they begin as small, stalked globes but soon flatten into appressed, shield-shaped discs that lack a clear rim (immarginate). Müller also described the paraphyses as extremely thin, irregular, and interconnected, and the spores as colourless (hyaline) and divided by transverse septa; he knew only a single species at the time, Actinoplaca strigulacea (the type species).

Later work reinterpreted what makes Actinoplaca distinctive and reshaped its limits. Robert Lücking and co-authors explained that Müller established the genus for a single species, A. strigulacea, whose most striking feature is the production of globose structures that Müller called "sporodochia"; these are now understood to be hyphophores, and were among the first hyphophores ever described even though their function was not recognized at the time. Because the apothecia are closely attached to the thallus, Rolf Santesson later submerged the species in Echinoplaca, but Antonín Vězda and Josef Poelt revived Actinoplaca and briefly expanded it by adding a second species based on Tricharia vulgaris. Molecular analyses discussed by Lücking and colleagues, however, indicate that this broader concept does not form a natural group: the "second species" belongs in Gyalideopsis, while A. strigulacea instead groups with Echinoplaca gemmifera; both share a specialized, isidia-like hyphophore type, even though their thalli and apothecia otherwise resemble Echinoplaca. Although the exact relationships of this pair were not fully resolved (and may be distorted by convergent hyphophore features in the phylogenetic analyses), the authors retained Actinoplaca as a separate genus and transferred E. gemmifera into it, narrowing the genus back towards a concept centred on A. strigulacea and its close relatives.

== Species ==
- Actinoplaca balboana Sambo (1938)
- Actinoplaca gemmifera (Lücking) Lücking, Sérus. & Vězda (2005)
- Actinoplaca strigulacea Müll.Arg. (1891)

The former species A. vulgaris (Müll.Arg.) Vězda & Poelt (1987) has since been transferred to Gyalideopsis as Gyalideopsis vulgaris.
