= Vezdamyces =

Scientific classification
- Domain: Eukaryota
- Kingdom: Fungi
- Division: Ascomycota
- Class: Lecanoromycetes
- Order: Graphidales
- Family: Gomphillaceae
- Genus: Vezdamyces; Xavier-Leite, M.Cáceres & Lücking (2023)

Type species
- Vezdamyces vulgaris (Müll.Arg.) Xavier-Leite, M.Cáceres & Lücking (2023)

Species
- V. albopruinosus V. vulgaris

Genus of lichens

Vezdamyces is a small genus of lichen-forming fungi in the family Gomphillaceae. It comprises two species of leaf-dwelling lichens that grow in tropical forests.

== Taxonomy ==
The genus was established by Amanda Xavier-Leite, Marcela Cáceres, and Robert Lücking, and is named in honour of Antonín Vězda, a prominent 20th-century lichenologist who greatly scientific understanding of leaf-dwelling (foliicolous) lichens, particularly in the family Gomphillaceae.

The classification of the two lichens in this genus has been challenging for scientists, and the type species (V. vulgaris) has been placed in several different genera over time. It was first described in Lopadium (1881), then moved to Tricharia, later to Actinoplaca, and then to Gyalideopsis, before finally being recognised as its own distinct genus through modern genetic analysis.

== Description ==
These lichens form a continuous, finely warty layer on leaf surfaces, but unlike some related genera, they lack bristles on their main body. Their reproductive structures (apothecia) sit directly on or slightly above the surface and have a distinctive yellowish-green centre with a yellow or white-frosted rim.

A unique feature of the genus is their specialised reproductive structures (hyphophores), which appear as short white bristles coated with crystals. These structures produce chains of club-shaped to sperm-shaped cells (diahyphae), with tiny algal cells scattered between them. Under the microscope, each reproductive structure produces just a single large ascospore that is divided into multiple compartments both lengthwise and crosswise (muriform).

== Species ==
- Vezdamyces albopruinosus (Lücking) Xavier-Leite, M.Cáceres & Lücking (2023)
- Vezdamyces vulgaris (Müll.Arg.) Xavier-Leite, M.Cáceres & Lücking (2023)
