= Batistomyces =

Scientific classification
- Domain: Eukaryota
- Kingdom: Fungi
- Division: Ascomycota
- Class: Lecanoromycetes
- Order: Graphidales
- Family: Gomphillaceae
- Genus: Batistomyces; Xavier-Leite, M.Cáceres & Lücking (2023)

Type species
- Batistomyces hyalinus (Kalb & Vězda) Xavier-Leite, M.Cáceres & Lücking (2023)

Species
- B. hyalinus B. pallidus

Genus of lichens

Batistomyces is a small genus of fungi in the family Gomphillaceae. It has two species of leaf-dwelling (foliicolous) lichens. These microlichens form very thin layers on the surface of leaves, appearing to the naked eye as small, fuzzy dark patches due to their numerous short black bristles.

== Taxonomy ==
The genus was established by Amanda Xavier-Leite, Marcela Cáceres, and Robert Lücking in 2023. It is named in honour of Augusto Chaves Batista, a Brazilian mycologist known for his research on tropical fungi and lichens, particularly those in the family Gomphillaceae. The genus was created after molecular studies showed that these species were distinct from Tricharia, where they were previously classified. While they share some features with Tricharia species, Batistomyces can be distinguished by its uniquely dense arrangement of short, stiff black bristles on its surface.

== Description ==
These lichens form a continuous layer (thallus) on leaf surfaces, with a distinctive appearance characterised by numerous, densely packed, short black bristles (setae) that make them look somewhat like miniature dark fuzzy patches on the leaf. Their reproductive structures (apothecia) are translucent and either sit directly on the surface or are slightly elevated on very short stalks. These structures have a thin, prominent rim around their edge.

Under microscopic examination, the internal structure reveals colourless tissue layers. The spores they produce are divided into multiple compartments both lengthwise and crosswise (muriform). The genus also produces specialised reproductive structures called hyphophores, which are black and bristle-like. These structures bear distinctive chains of sausage-shaped cells (diahyphae) at their tips.

== Species ==
- Batistomyces hyalinus (Kalb & Vězda) Xavier-Leite, M.Cáceres & Lücking (2023)
- Batistomyces pallidus (Vězda) Xavier-Leite, M.Cáceres & Lücking (2023)
