= Calenia bullatinoides =

Scientific classification
- Domain: Eukaryota
- Kingdom: Fungi
- Division: Ascomycota
- Class: Lecanoromycetes
- Order: Graphidales
- Family: Gomphillaceae
- Genus: Calenia
- Species: C. bullatinoides

Binomial name
- Calenia bullatinoides Lücking (2001)

Species of lichen

Calenia bullatinoides is a foliicolous (leaf-dwelling) lichen species in the family Gomphillaceae. It was discovered in New South Wales, Australia, and has been observed in other locations including Costa Rica, Cocos Island, and Kenya. The thallus of this species forms dispersed or sometimes confluent patches that are slightly inflated due to a strong encrustation with calcium oxalate crystals. These patches are whitish to silvery grey, with a smooth to irregularly rough and wrinkled surface texture and a narrow, crystal-free, greenish margin.

== Description ==
The thallus of Calenia bullatinoides is marked by a slight inflation, a feature caused by the accumulation of calcium oxalate crystals, and for its smooth to irregularly rugose surface. Apothecia (fruiting bodies) are centrally located on each thallus patch, emerging from the thallus and are rounded with a disc colour ranging from yellowish grey to yellowish brown. The margin of the apothecia is thin yet prominent, and the proper margin is reduced, surrounded by a thick thalline margin abundant in algal cells. The photobiont of the lichen is chlorococcoid (a spherical green alga).

Paraphyses within the hymenium are richly branched and anastomosing, leading to ellipsoid-ovoid asci. Ascospores are cylindrical to oblong-ellipsoid, submuriform to muriform, and colourless, with approximately 15 transverse and 1–3 longitudinal septa (internal partitions) per segment.

Hyphophores, specialised asexual spore-producing organs formed on the crystalline thallus patches, are short, setiform (bristle-like), and have an apically darkened tip. This species is differentiated by its thallus morphology, the unique characteristic of having 2–4 submuriform to muriform ascospores per ascus, and its short, apically darkened hyphophores.

== Similar species ==
Calenia bullatinoides is closely related to Calenia solorinoides but can be distinguished by its thallus morphology, apothecial margin presence, and multi-spored asci. While C. submuralis also has more than one submuriform ascospore per ascus, its ascospores are smaller. Other species such as Gyalectidium ciliatum and Bullatina aspidota show superficial similarities but differ significantly in their hyphophores, asci, and thallus morphology.

== Habitat and distribution ==
Originally described from New South Wales, the lichen has also been recorded from Costa Rica and Cocos Island. In 2002, it was reported from a coastal rainforest in Shimba Hills in Kenya.
