= Verruciplaca =

Scientific classification
- Domain: Eukaryota
- Kingdom: Fungi
- Division: Ascomycota
- Class: Lecanoromycetes
- Order: Graphidales
- Family: Gomphillaceae
- Genus: Verruciplaca; Xavier-Leite, M.Cáceres & Lücking (2023)

Type species
- Verruciplaca verrucifera (Lücking) Xavier-Leite, Cáceres & Lücking (2023)

Species
- V. calcarea V. verrucifera

Genus of lichens

Verruciplaca is a small genus of fungi in the family Gomphillaceae. It comprises two species of leaf-dwelling lichens.

== Taxonomy ==
The genus Verruciplaca was established in 2023 by Amanda Xavier-Leite, Marcela Cáceres, and Robert Lücking. Molecular phylogenetics analyses showed that some species previously classified in Echinoplaca represented a distinct evolutionary lineage. The genus name comes from its most distinctive feature – the large warty bumps (verrucae) that cover its surface.

There are at least two additional distinct lineages within the genus that remain to be formally described as new species. While Verruciplaca appears similar to the related genus Sipmanidea, particularly in its general appearance and structure, genetic evidence shows they are separate evolutionary lines. The main distinguishing feature between these genera appears to be differences in their spores, though more research is needed to fully understand the relationship between these groups.

== Description ==
Verruciplaca lichens form either a continuous or scattered layer on leaf surfaces, characterised by coarse, warty bumps that are usually covered in a whitish to bluish frosting-like coating (pruina). They have distinctive white branching bristles that typically grow from a clear base layer. Their reproductive structures (apothecia) appear as orange spots on the surface, often with a white frosted edge made up of needle-shaped crystals.

A unique feature of the genus is its specialised reproductive structures (hyphophores), which are pale yellow and bristle-like. These structures produce two types of thread-like filaments (diahyphae) – thick and thin ones - with the thin ones ending in distinctive club-shaped or sperm-like segments. Under the microscope, their main reproductive structures typically produce eight spores per sac (ascus), with each spore divided into multiple compartments both lengthwise and crosswise.

== Species ==
- Verruciplaca calcarea (Lücking) Xavier-Leite, M.Cáceres & Lücking (2023)
- Verruciplaca verrucifera (Lücking) Xavier-Leite, Cáceres & Lücking (2023)
