= Ferraroa =

Scientific classification
- Domain: Eukaryota
- Kingdom: Fungi
- Division: Ascomycota
- Class: Lecanoromycetes
- Order: Graphidales
- Family: Gomphillaceae
- Genus: Ferraroa; Lücking, Sérus. & Vězda (2005)
- Species: F. hyalina

Binomial name
- Ferraroa hyalina (Lücking) Lücking, Sérus. & Vězda (2005)

Synonyms
- Gyalideopsis hyalina Lücking (1997)

Single-species lichen genus

Ferraroa is a single-species genus in the family Gomphillaceae. It is a monotypic genus, containing the single species Ferraroa hyalina, a foliicolous (leaf-dwelling) lichen. This species was originally described by Robert Lücking in 1997 as Gyalideopsis hyalina. The type specimen was collected from leaves of Inga oerstediana in Costa Rica. Lücking, Emmanuël Sérusiaux, and Antonín Vězda transferred the taxon to the newly circumscribed genus Ferraroa in 2005 after molecular phylogenetic analysis showed it to belong to a unique lineage. The generic name Ferraroa honours Argentinian lichenologist Lidia Itatí Ferraro, "for her many contributions to lichenology in southern South America, and to our knowledge of Gomphillaceae".
