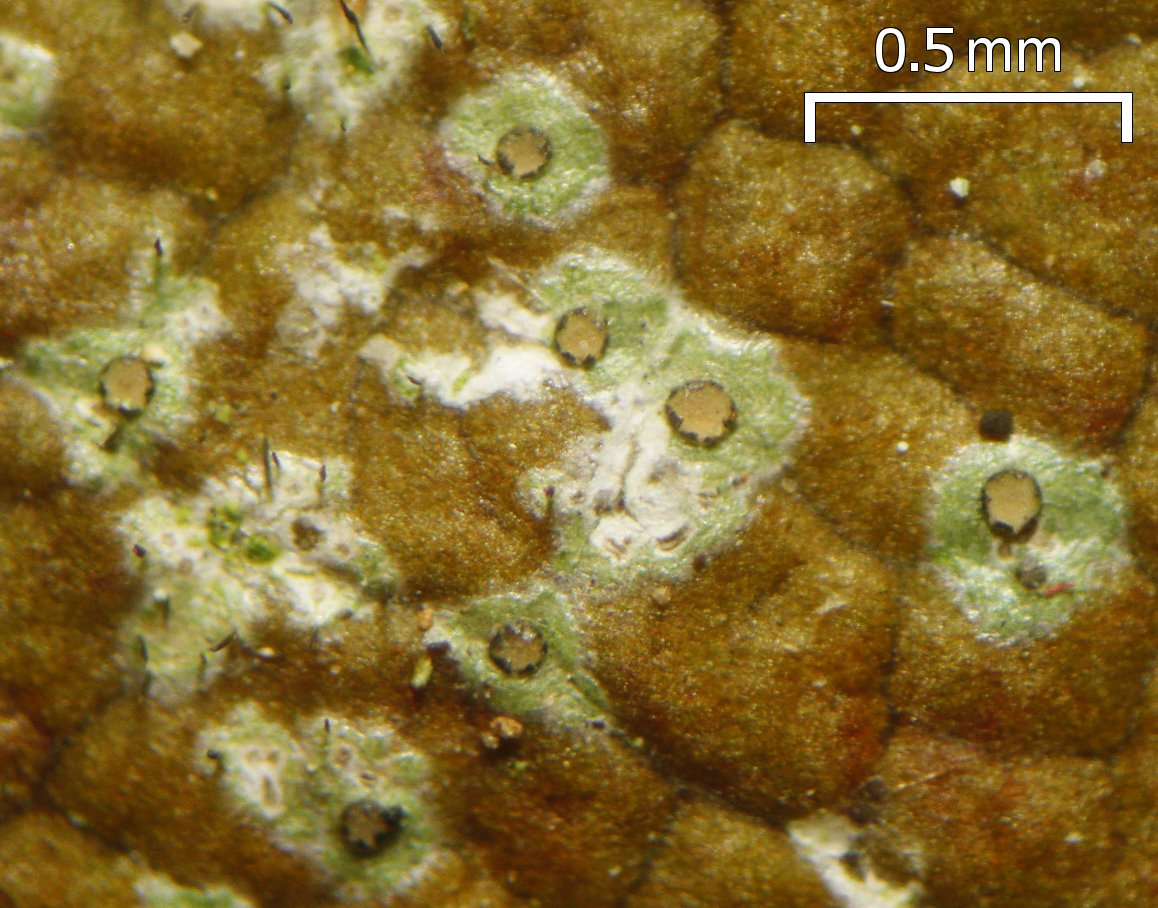
- Microxyphiomyces santessonii

Scientific classification
- Kingdom: Fungi
- Division: Ascomycota
- Class: Lecanoromycetes
- Order: Graphidales
- Family: Gomphillaceae
- Genus: Microxyphiomyces; Bat., Valle & Peres (1961)

Type species
- Microxyphiomyces vainioi (R.Sant.) Xavier-Leite, M.Cáceres & Lücking (2023)

= Microxyphiomyces =

Genus of lichen-forming fungi

Microxyphiomyces is a genus of lichen-forming fungi in the family Gomphillaceae. The genus was originally proposed in 1961 by Augusto Chaves Batista and colleagues, but was later merged into the genus Tricharia for much of the twentieth century before being reinstated in 2023 based on molecular evidence. These are minute lichens that grow exclusively on the surfaces of living leaves in tropical and subtropical forests, forming thin crusts decorated with fine black bristles and producing small disc-shaped reproductive structures. The genus has a pantropical distribution, with species recorded from the Neotropics, western Pacific, and East Asia.

== Taxonomy ==
Microxyphiomyces was circumscribed by Augusto Chaves Batista, R.C. Valle, and Generosa Emília Pontual Peres in 1961 for a foliicolous (leaf-dwelling) lichen that had previously been shuffled among several imperfect fungus genera. Their protologue designated M. manaosensis as the type species; that name is now treated as a synonym of M. vainioi, which therefore serves as the modern type species. A second, invalid generic name (Setomyces) was published almost simultaneously for the same material and is treated as a heterotypic synonym.

For much of the twentieth century the genus was folded into the widespread and morphologically variable Tricharia because its smooth thallus and delicate, sterile setae were considered minor variants within that assemblage. Phenotypic cladistic work first hinted that the "T. vainioi group" formed an independent lineage, and two-locus molecular phylogenies later confirmed that it is only distantly related to the core species of Tricharia. On that evidence, Xavier-Leite and colleagues reinstated Microxyphiomyces in 2023, transferred fourteen names into it, and restricted Tricharia to species with coarsely verrucose thalli and stout setae.

== Description ==
Microxyphiomyces species are minute, leaf-dwelling lichens that form a thin, continuous thallus closely appressed to the leaf surface. The thallus is smooth rather than warted and ranges from pale greenish to grey-green; it is thread through with fine, black, sterile bristles (setae) that emerge singly or in loose tufts and give the colony a subtle, bristly sheen. These setae are markedly slimmer and more flexible than those seen in Tricharia (in the strict sense), a difference that, together with the unbroken thallus surface, makes the genus recognisable in the field.

The fruit-bodies (apothecia) sit directly on the thallus. Most species develop small, biatorine discs—meaning the margin derives solely from fungal tissue—whose pale to orange-brown centres contrast with a thin, paler rim; in a few taxa the discs break through the thallus and become shallowly bowl-shaped (a chroodiscoid form). Setae often arise around or between apothecia but never grow from the disc itself. Internally, the hymenium produces eight colourless ascospores per ascus. Spores start with only a few cross-walls (septa) and mature through additional septation into short, brick-like chambers (muriform pattern); they are released as single-celled propagules that rely on wind or water splash for dispersal.

A second reproductive device, the hyphophore, is common in the genus. These structures look like hair-thin black pins that may remain simple, curve in a gentle hook, or branch sparsely toward the tip. Each hyphophore bears chains of tiny, bead-like cells (diahyphae) that break apart to function as vegetative diaspores. The three informal morphodemes (groupings based on shared physical features) recognised by Xavier-Leite and colleagues correspond to differing combinations of apothecial form and hyphophore architecture: Microxyphiomyces sensu stricto with simple hyphophores and biatorine apothecia; the M. lancicarpus complex with chroodiscoid apothecia; and the M. elegans group characterised by uniquely hooked or branched hyphophores.

== Habitat and distribution ==
All known members of Microxyphiomyces are obligately foliicolous: they colonise the surfaces of living, evergreen leaves in the shaded understory of humid tropical to subtropical forests. The smooth, tightly appressed thallus adheres directly to the cuticle, while the flexible black setae and pin-like hyphophores project into the thin, persistent boundary layer of moisture that forms on leaf blades. These features appear to be adaptations to the periodically wet yet well-aerated microclimate typical of intact rainforest canopies and leaf litter, and the genus has not been recorded on bark, wood or rock.

The genus has a broad pantropical distribution. Sequenced or type specimens come from the Neotropics (Costa Rica, Brazil, French Guiana and Paraguay), the western Pacific (Papua New Guinea) and the Palaeotropics of East Asia (Japan). Although no confirmed African collections have yet been reported, the occurrence pattern of related foliicolous Gomphillaceae suggests that suitable habitat is available and the genus is probably under-collected there. At present, the greatest species richness is documented from South America, where multiple morphodemes occur sympatrically on the same forest strata.

== Species ==
- Microxyphiomyces cuneatus (L.I.Ferraro & Vězda) Xavier-Leite, M.Cáceres & Lücking (2023)
- Microxyphiomyces demoulinii (Sérus.) Xavier-Leite, M.Cáceres & Lücking (2023)
- Microxyphiomyces elegans (Sérus.) Xavier-Leite, M.Cáceres & Lücking (2023)
- Microxyphiomyces kashiwadanii (G.Thor, Lücking & Tat. Matsumoto) Xavier-Leite, M.Cáceres & Lücking (2023)
- Microxyphiomyces lancicarpus (Kalb & Vězda) Xavier-Leite, M.Cáceres & Lücking (2023)
- Microxyphiomyces santessonianus (Kalb & Vězda) Xavier-Leite, M.Cáceres & Lücking (2023)
- Microxyphiomyces santessonii (D.Hawksw.) Xavier-Leite, M.Cáceres & Lücking (2023)
- Microxyphiomyces similis (Vězda) Xavier-Leite, M.Cáceres & Lücking (2023)
- Microxyphiomyces vainioi (R.Sant.) Xavier-Leite, M.Cáceres & Lücking (2023)
- Microxyphiomyces variratae (Lücking & Sipman) Xavier-Leite, M.Cáceres & Lücking (2023)
