= Bezerroplaca =

Scientific classification
- Domain: Eukaryota
- Kingdom: Fungi
- Division: Ascomycota
- Class: Lecanoromycetes
- Order: Graphidales
- Family: Gomphillaceae
- Genus: Bezerroplaca; Xavier-Leite, M.Cáceres & Lücking (2023)

Type species
- Bezerroplaca lucernifera (Kalb & Vězda) Xavier-Leite, M.Cáceres & Lücking (2023)

Species
- B. fusconitida B. incrustatociliata B. lucernifera B. pachyparaphysata B. streimannii

Genus of lichens

Bezerroplaca is a genus of lichen-forming fungi in the family Gomphillaceae. It has five species of tropical lichens that grow on living leaves.

== Taxonony ==
The genus Bezerroplaca was established in 2023 by Amanda Xavier-Leite, Marcela Cáceres, and Robert Lücking. It is named in honour of José Luiz Bezerra for his contributions to the study of leaf-dwelling lichens in Brazil. Five species are recognised in the genus. These species were previously classified in the genus Echinoplaca, but were separated based on their unique combination of characteristics, particularly their bell-shaped clusters of reproductive filaments and sperm-like end segments.

== Description ==
These tiny lichens form a continuous, slightly warty layer on leaf surfaces, dotted with scattered white bristles. One of their most distinctive features is their specialised reproductive structures (hyphophores), which are white bristles with darkened tips. These bristles produce unique bell-shaped bunches of thread-like filaments (diahyphae) that have distinctive sperm-shaped end segments.

Their main reproductive structures (apothecia) appear as flat, dark spots on the surface, ranging from brown to black in colour. Under the microscope, these structures show brown colouration in both their lower layers (hypothecium) and upper layers (epithecium), and produce spores that are divided into multiple compartments both lengthwise and crosswise (muriform spores).

== Species ==
- Bezerroplaca fusconitida (Lücking) Xavier-Leite, M.Cáceres & Lücking (2023)
- Bezerroplaca incrustatociliata (Sérus.) Xavier-Leite, M.Cáceres & Lücking (2023)
- Bezerroplaca lucernifera (Kalb & Vězda) Xavier-Leite, M.Cáceres & Lücking (2023)
- Bezerroplaca pachyparaphysata (R.Sant.) Xavier-Leite, M.Cáceres & Lücking (2023)
- Bezerroplaca streimannii (Sérus.) Xavier-Leite, M.Cáceres & Lücking (2023)
