= Aptrootidea =

Scientific classification
- Domain: Eukaryota
- Kingdom: Fungi
- Division: Ascomycota
- Class: Lecanoromycetes
- Order: Graphidales
- Family: Gomphillaceae
- Genus: Aptrootidea; Xavier-Leite, M.Cáceres & Lücking (2023)

Type species
- Aptrootidea marginata (Lücking) Xavier-Leite, M.Cáceres & Lücking (2023)

Species
- A. amapensis A. atrofusca A. atromuralis A. marginata A. triseptata A. wilsoniorum

Genus of lichens

Aptrootidea is a genus of fungi in the family Gomphillaceae. It has six species of leaf-dwelling (foliicolous) lichens.

== Taxonomy ==
The genus was established in 2023 by Amanda Xavier-Leite, Marcela Cáceres, and Robert Lücking, and is named in honour of André Aptroot, a prominent researcher in tropical lichen studies. The genus was created after molecular analyses showed that these species were distinct from the genus Echinoplaca where they were previously classified. While molecular analysis has only been performed on the type species, the other five species are provisionally included based on shared characteristics, though they might eventually be moved to a separate genus with further research.

== Description ==
Aptrootidea lichens are characterised by their growth pattern, which can be either continuous or scattered across the leaf surface. A distinctive feature of some species is the presence of small, dark bristles that grow from a transparent base layer (the prothallus). Their reproductive structures (apothecia) are flat or slightly raised, appearing as dark spots ranging from chocolate-brown to nearly black in colour.

When viewed under a microscope, these lichens reveal a complex internal structure. Their body is made up of loosely interwoven fungal threads (forming a hyphal excipulum), above which sits a pale, densely packed layer of cells (prosoplectenchymatous hypothecium) that supports the spore-producing region. The uppermost layer (epithecium) appears dark brown in colour. Within the reproductive structures, the fungi produce spores (ascospores) that can have different numbers of internal divisions (septa) depending on the species. Unlike some related lichens, no specialised stalked structures (hyphophores) have been observed in this genus.

== Species ==
- Aptrootidea amapensis (Bat. & Poroca) Xavier-Leite, M.Cáceres & Lücking (2023)
- Aptrootidea atrofusca (R.Sant.) Xavier-Leite, M.Cáceres & Lücking (2023)
- Aptrootidea atromuralis (Lücking) Xavier-Leite, M.Cáceres & Lücking (2023)
- Aptrootidea marginata (Lücking) Xavier-Leite, M.Cáceres & Lücking (2023)
- Aptrootidea triseptata (Lücking) Xavier-Leite, M.Cáceres & Lücking (2023)
- Aptrootidea wilsoniorum (Lücking) Xavier-Leite, M.Cáceres & Lücking (2023)
