= Calenia lueckingii =

Scientific classification
- Domain: Eukaryota
- Kingdom: Fungi
- Division: Ascomycota
- Class: Lecanoromycetes
- Order: Graphidales
- Family: Gomphillaceae
- Genus: Calenia
- Species: C. lueckingii

Binomial name
- Calenia lueckingii C.Hartmann (1996)

Species of lichen

Calenia lueckingii is a species of foliicolous (leaf-dwelling) lichen in the family Gomphillaceae. It was formally described as a new species in 1996 by Claudia Hartmann. The type specimen was collected by the author from the edge of Braulio Carrillo National Park (Heredia Province) in Costa Rica; there it was found growing on the leaves of Ardisia in a tropical wet transition rainforest. The species epithet honours German lichenologist Robert Lücking. In 2018, the lichen was recorded from Hainan, China.
