= Phyllogyalidea =

Scientific classification
- Domain: Eukaryota
- Kingdom: Fungi
- Division: Ascomycota
- Class: Lecanoromycetes
- Order: Graphidales
- Family: Gomphillaceae
- Genus: Phyllogyalidea; Lücking & Aptroot (2008)

Type species
- Phyllogyalidea epiphylla (Vězda) Lücking & Aptroot (2008)

Species
- P. epiphylla P. phyllophila

Lichen genus in the family Gomphillaceae

Phyllogyalidea is a genus of lichens in the family Gomphillaceae. It was circumscribed in 2008 by lichenologists Robert Lücking and André Aptroot, with Phyllogyalidea epiphylla designated as the type species. P. phyllophila was recorded from the Shakhe River valley (Krasnodar Territory, Western Transcaucasia) in 2016.
