= Aulaxinella =

Scientific classification
- Domain: Eukaryota
- Kingdom: Fungi
- Division: Ascomycota
- Class: Lecanoromycetes
- Order: Graphidales
- Family: Gomphillaceae
- Genus: Aulaxinella; Xavier-Leite, M.Cáceres & Lücking (2023)

Type species
- Aulaxinella minuta (R.Sant.) Xavier-Leite, M.Cáceres & Lücking (2023)

Species
- A. corticola A. minuta A. multiseptata

Genus of lichens

Aulaxinella is a genus of fungi in the family Gomphillaceae. It comprises three species that primarily grow on living leaves (foliicolous), though rarely some species can be found on tree bark (corticolous).

== Taxonomy ==
The genus was established in 2023 by Amanda Xavier-Leite, Marcela Cáceres, and Robert Lücking after molecular studies showed that the type species, A. minuta, was distinct from the related genus Aulaxina. The name Aulaxinella refers to its similarity to Aulaxina, with the diminutive ending indicating its generally smaller size.

== Description ==
Aulaxinella lichens form a continuous layer (thallus) on their substrate, with a distinctive dark brown border (prothallus) around the edges. Their reproductive structures (apothecia) appear crater-like, emerging from the surface with a prominent dark rim that lacks algal cells. The central part of these structures is brownish in colour.

A distinctive feature of the genus is its specialised reproductive structures called hyphophores, which appear in groups on patches of the lichen that lack algal cells. These structures are black and bristle-like with blunt tips. They produce unique branching threads (diahyphae) that emerge from their tips in 3–5 separate bunches, forming chains of small, sometimes divided segments.

== Species ==
- Aulaxinella corticola (Kalb & Vězda) Xavier-Leite, M.Cáceres & Lücking (2023)
- Aulaxinella minuta (R.Sant.) Xavier-Leite, M.Cáceres & Lücking (2023)
- Aulaxinella multiseptata (R.Sant.) Xavier-Leite, M.Cáceres & Lücking (2023)
