= Mesophelliopsis =

Scientific classification
- Kingdom: Fungi
- Division: Basidiomycota
- Class: Agaricomycetes
- Order: Agaricales
- Family: incertae sedis
- Genus: Mesophelliopsis; Bat. & A.F.Vital (1957)

Type species
- Mesophelliopsis pernambucensis Bat. & A.F.Vital (1957)

Genus of fungi

Mesophelliopsis is a genus of fungi in the order Agaricales. It is incertae sedis with respect to familial placement within the order. The genus is monotypic, containing the single species Mesophelliopsis pernambucensis, found in Brazil.
