= Rolueckia =

Scientific classification
- Kingdom: Fungi
- Division: Ascomycota
- Class: Lecanoromycetes
- Order: Graphidales
- Family: Gomphillaceae
- Genus: Rolueckia; Papong, Thammath. & Boonpr. (2008)

Type species
- Rolueckia conspersa (Stirt.) Papong, Thammath. & Boonpr. (2008)

Species
- R. aggregata; R. conspersa; R. siamensis

Genus of lichen-forming fungi

Rolueckia is a small genus of leaf-dwelling lichens in the family Gomphillaceae. It forms thin, pale green-grey films on the living leaves of tropical forest plants. Established in 2008 by Thai lichenologists, this genus is distinguished by its unique reproductive structures—tall, reddish-brown bristles called hyphophores that produce tiny rod-shaped propagules for asexual reproduction. The three recognized species share similar microscopic fruit bodies called apothecia that contain exceptionally small, few-segmented spores, but can be differentiated by their specific spore patterns and the presence or absence of sterile bristles. These specialized lichens grow exclusively in the humid, shaded understory of tropical rainforests where consistent moisture protects them from drying out.

== Taxonomy ==
Rolueckia was circumscribed in 2008 by the Thai lichenologists Khwanruan Papong, Achra Thammathaworn, and Kansri Boonpragob to accommodate the Calenia conspersa species complex, a group that had most recently been placed in the genus Caleniopsis but showed a distinctive asexual anatomy not seen elsewhere in the family Gomphillaceae, order Ostropales. The authors drew attention to the setiform hyphophores: stiff, reddish-brown bristles that widen into a minute club and shed countless rod-shaped propagules (diahyphae). Because these structures are much larger and morphologically simpler than the branched, prothallus-borne hyphophores of Caleniopsis, they considered the conspersa group generically distinct. Their diagnosis was further supported by a phenotype-based phylogenetic analysis that had already recovered the group as a separate, monophyletic lineage sister to Caleniopsis within Gomphillaceae.

The genus name honours the German lichenologist Robert Lücking for his extensive work on foliicolous (leaf-dwelling) lichens. Papong and co-workers designated Rolueckia conspersa as the type species, tracing its nomenclatural journey from Thelotrema conspersa (1878) through Calenia (1952) and Caleniopsis (2005) before settling in its present combination. Two additional taxa were assigned at the same time: R. aggregata, transferred from Calenia, and R. siamensis, described as new. All three species share the same immersed-erumpent, zeorine apothecia and a small, few-segmented ascospore design, yet differ in apothecial aggregation, septation pattern and the presence or absence of sterile setae.

== Description ==
Rolueckia forms a thin, crust-like film (the thallus) that grows directly on living leaves in moist tropical forests. This film is smooth, pale green-grey to whitish, and often edged by a narrow reddish-brown strip known as the prothallus, which marks where the lichen meets the leaf surface. Inside the thallus live microscopic green algae (Trebouxia-type photobionts) that supply food through photosynthesis. Sexual reproduction occurs in minute, round fruit-bodies (apothecia) that begin buried in the thallus and later break through it. Each apothecium is less than 0.2 mm across and encircled by a mixed fungal-and-thallus rim (described as zeorine). The spore-producing layer (hymenium) is colourless, as is the supporting tissue beneath (hypothecium). Within every club-shaped ascus eight colourless spores develop; these spores are exceptionally small (about 10–14 μm long) and are divided by one to three cross-walls (septa), a feature that helps distinguish species in the genus.

A conspicuous trait that separates Rolueckia from other members of the family Gomphillaceae is the presence of tall, hair-like asexual organs called hyphophores. These rise 0.3–0.5 mm above the thallus as stiff reddish-brown bristles that broaden into a tiny club at the tip. The club produces countless rod-shaped propagules (diahyphae) only 5–6 μm long; unlike ordinary fungal hyphae, these lack cross-walls and behave much like single-celled spores, allowing the lichen to spread without forming new apothecia. The internal tissues of the thallus and apothecia consist of tightly packed, lengthwise-oriented fungal cells (prosoplectenchyma), while delicate supporting filaments (paraphyses) branch and knit together above the asci. In some species, additional sterile bristles (setae) dot the surface, giving it a slightly fuzzy appearance. The combination of a leaf-dwelling crustose thallus, zeorine apothecia, club-tipped hyphophores with bacilliform diahyphae, and small, few-segmented spores defines Rolueckia and sets it apart from superficially similar genera.

== Habitat and distribution ==
Rolueckia species are strictly foliicolous – they colonise the living leaves of evergreen trees and shrubs rather than bark or rock. The thallus forms a thin, smooth film that adheres tightly to the lamina, a position that keeps the lichen in the permanently humid boundary layer around the leaf surface. Field observations place the genus in the shaded understory of lower-montane rain forest, where diffuse light, regular mist and stable temperatures prevent desiccation. For example, the type locality of R. siamensis lies in a lower-montane broad-leaf forest at about 1,003 metres elevation in western Thailand, and all additional Thai collections of the genus came from similarly moist, mid-elevation forest sites.

Although the group shares this very specific microhabitat, its geographical range is broadly tropical. Rolueckia conspersa is pantropical but infrequently recorded; the species appears sporadically across the world's humid tropical belts. R. aggregata is known only from the Neotropics and is considered rare even there, whereas R. siamensis is confined to South-East Asia and has been verified only from several national-park localities in Thailand. The distribution pattern therefore spans Central and South America, through to mainland South-East Asia, but always in warm, humid forests where intact canopy cover and persistent leaf wetness occur.

== Species ==
As of May 2025, Species Fungorum (in the Catalogue of Life) accepts three species of Rolueckia:

- Rolueckia aggregata (R.Sant.) Papong, Thammath. & Boonpr. (2008)
- Rolueckia conspersa (Stirt.) Papong, Thammath. & Boonpr. (2008)
- Rolueckia siamensis Papong, Thammath. & Boonpr. (2008)
