= Adelphomyces =

Scientific classification
- Kingdom: Fungi
- Division: Ascomycota
- Class: Lecanoromycetes
- Order: Graphidales
- Family: Gomphillaceae
- Genus: Adelphomyces; Xavier-Leite, M.Cáceres & Lücking (2023)

Type species
- Adelphomyces epithallinus (Lücking) Xavier-Leite, M.Cáceres & Lücking (2023)

Species
- A. cochlearifer A. epithallinus A. parvulus

Genus of lichens

Adelphomyces is a genus of lichenicolous (lichen-dwelling) fungi in the family Gomphillaceae. It comprises three species.

== Taxonomy ==
The genus was established by Amanda Xavier-Leite, Marcela Cáceres, and Robert Lücking to accommodate some species previously classified under Gyalideopsis, based on both molecular phylogenetics evidence and cladistic analyses, which demonstrated that Gyalideopsis as traditionally defined was polyphyletic. The name Adelphomyces refers to its parasitic nature, specifically growing on lichens of the same family (adelphoparasitism). These species are primarily found growing on other lichens, with two species parasitising members of Gomphillaceae and one species growing on Ectolechiaceae.

== Description ==
The genus can be identified by several key features of its reproductive structures. It produces small, cup-shaped spore-producing bodies (apothecia) that grow directly on the surface without stalks (sessile) and have a distinctive rim around the edge. The spores themselves are tiny and are divided into 2–4 cells by internal partitions (septa). Some species in the genus also produce specialised structures called hyphophores, which are black and bristle-like, with tips that widen out either into a beak-like or paddle-like shape. Another distinctive feature is their string-like fungal threads (diahyphae), which look like chains of small beads or droplets connected together.

== Species ==
- Adelphomyces cochlearifer (Lücking & Sérus.) Xavier-Leite, M.Cáceres & Lücking (2023)
- Adelphomyces epithallinus (Lücking) Xavier-Leite, M.Cáceres & Lücking (2023)
- Adelphomyces parvulus (Hafellner & Vězda) Xavier-Leite, M.Cáceres & Lücking (2023)
