= Sporocybomyces =

Scientific classification
- Kingdom: Fungi
- Division: Ascomycota
- Class: Lecanoromycetes
- Order: Graphidales
- Family: Gomphillaceae
- Genus: Sporocybomyces; H.Maia (1967)

Type species
- Sporocybomyces pulcher H.Maia (1967)

Species
- S. leucomuralis S. leucotrichoides S. macgregorii S. pulcher

Genus of lichens

Sporocybomyces is a genus of lichen-forming fungi in the family Gomphillaceae. It has four species. The genus was originally circumscribed by the lichenologist Heraldo da Silva Maia in 1967, with S. pulcher assigned as the type, and at the time, only species. The genus was resurrected for use in 2023 to accommodate the phylogenetically distinct Echinoplaca leucotrichoides clade, and three species were added.

== Description ==
The main body (thallus) of Sporocybomyces forms a continuous layer with a finely warty surface texture. Unlike some related lichens, it typically does not produce sterile hair-like projections (setae). The reproductive structures (apothecia) lie flat against the thallus surface and appear as small spots, similar to those found in the genus Echinoplaca. These structures produce large spores that are divided by both crosswise walls (septa) and, in some cases, additional walls that create a maze-like (muriform) internal structure.

The genus is distinguished by two unique types of specialised hyphal structures. It produces short, blunt, bristle-like projections called hyphophores that are white with darkened tips. It also features thread-like structures called diahyphae that terminate in distinctive segments that are either club-shaped or sausage-shaped and divided by multiple internal walls.

== Species ==
- Sporocybomyces leucomuralis (Lücking) Xavier-Leite, M.Cáceres & Lücking (2023)
- Sporocybomyces leucotrichoides (Vain.) Xavier-Leite, M.Cáceres & Lücking (2023)
- Sporocybomyces macgregorii (Vain.) Xavier-Leite, M.Cáceres & Lücking (2023)
- Sporocybomyces pulcher H.Maia (1967)
