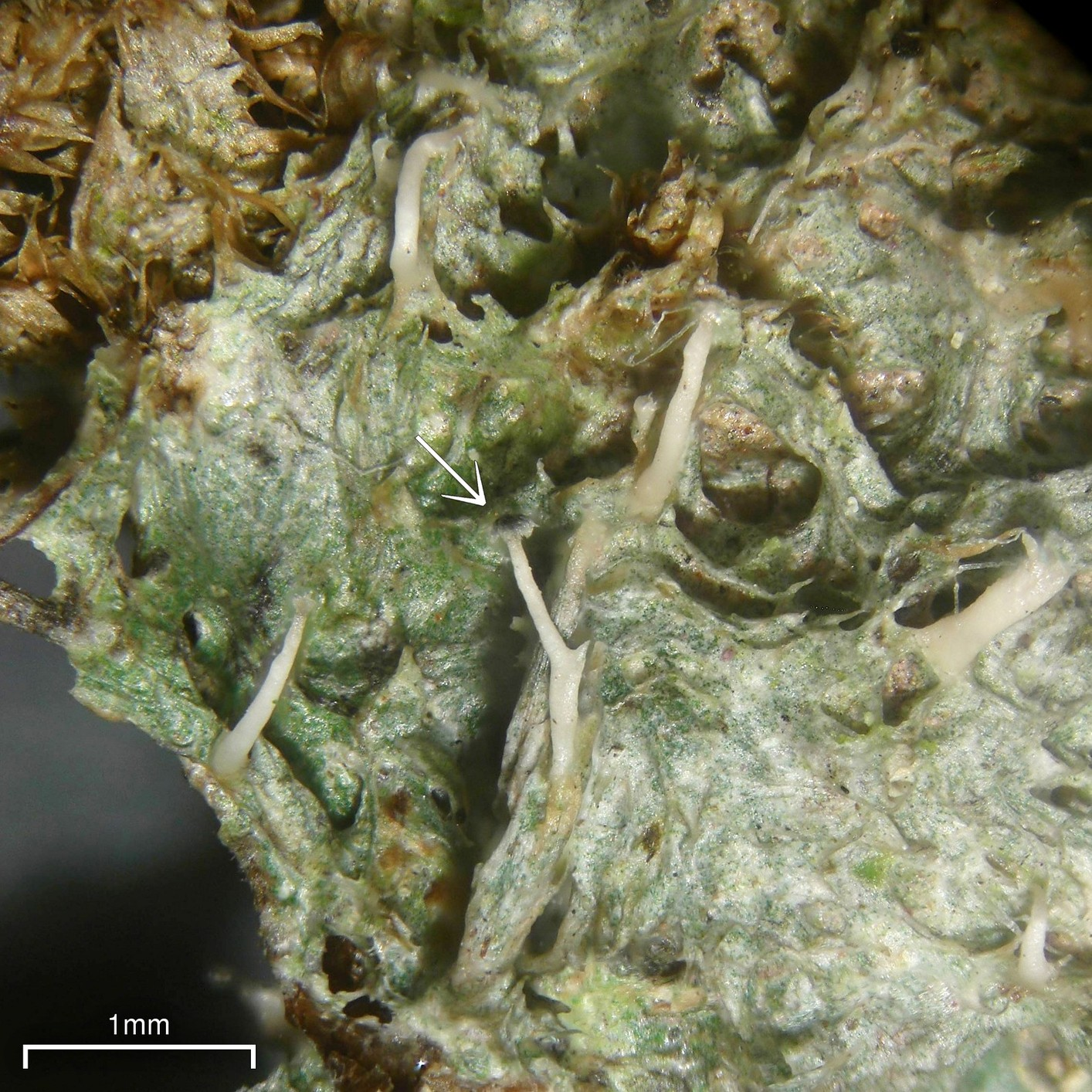
- Gomphillus americanus

Scientific classification
- Kingdom: Fungi
- Division: Ascomycota
- Class: Lecanoromycetes
- Order: Graphidales
- Family: Gomphillaceae
- Genus: Gomphillus; Nyl. (1855)

Type species
- Gomphillus calycioides (Delise ex Duby) Nyl. (1854)

Species
- G. americanus G. calycioides G. hyalinus G. morchelloides G. ophiosporus G. pedersenii

= Gomphillus =

Genus of lichen-forming fungi

Gomphillus is a genus of lichen-forming fungi in the family Gomphillaceae.

== Taxonomy ==
The genus was circumscribed by the Finnish lichenologist William Nylander in 1854, with G. calycioides assigned as the type species. The genus name originates from the Latin term gomphus, which itself derives from the Greek γόμφος, meaning 'bolt, nail, or peg'. It is combined with the diminutive suffix -illus.

== Description ==
Gomphillus lichens are characterised by their crustose thallus, which is very thin, semi-transparent, and sub-gelatinous when wet. The thallus can either spread irregularly across the substrate (effuse) or have well-defined edges. The primary photosynthetic partner (photobiont) in Gomphillus species is a chlorococcoid green alga, meaning the algal cells are spherical or nearly so.

The reproductive structures (ascomata) are apothecia, which are fruiting bodies that can appear irregularly spherical (globose) or often resemble a top shape. These structures are brown-black on the upper surface but gradually transition to pale or colourless at the lower portion. The apothecia lack a thalline margin (a rim derived from the lichen's body) but have a well-developed true exciple, a cup-like structure that extends below into a stalk-like extension. The exciple is pale brown at the upper edge and pale within, consisting of thin, interconnected hyphae embedded in a gelatinous matrix; it is not carbonised (hardened into a black, coal-like consistency). The uppermost layer of the apothecium (epithecium) is reddish-brown and smooth, lacking granules.

The internal structure of the apothecia (hamathecium) consists of numerous thin, interconnected filaments called paraphyses, each less than 1 μm wide, with tips that are not swollen. The asci, or spore-producing sacs, contain eight ascospores and are long and narrow—up to 50 times longer than they are wide. These asci are fissitunicate, meaning they have a specialised double-wall structure that aids in spore release, and they do not react to iodine staining (K/I–). The ascospores themselves are thread-like, extremely elongated, multi-septate (divided into many compartments), and colourless.

Gomphillus species also produce conidiomata, small structures for asexual reproduction, which appear as black on the upper surface and pale below. These structures release conidia, which are tiny, ellipsoidal cells that can disperse and form new colonies. In some related species outside the genus (extralimital species), specialised spore-producing structures called hyphophores are present. No lichen-specific secondary metabolites have been detected in Gomphillus species using thin-layer chromatography, a common method for identifying lichen substances.

== Habitat and distribution ==
The genus is found in the westernmost parts of Europe, ranging from Portugal to Norway, including the British Isles and Macaronesia. It is also present in eastern North America, tropical regions of the Americas, and Hawaii. It almost exclusively grows on bryophytes, including mosses, liverworts, and sometimes, other lichens.

== Species ==
As of December 2024, Species Fungorum (in the Catalogue of Life) accepts three species of Gomphillus, although more than these have been assigned to the genus.

- Gomphillus americanus Essl. (1975)
- Gomphillus calycioides (Delise ex Duby) Nyl. (1853)
- Gomphillus hyalinus (Pat.) Lücking, Kalb & Vězda (2007)
- Gomphillus morchelloides Lücking & Sérus. (2005)
- Gomphillus ophiosporus Kalb & Vězda (1988)
- Gomphillus pedersenii L.I.Ferraro & Lücking (2005) – Argentina
