= Diploschistella =

Scientific classification
- Domain: Eukaryota
- Kingdom: Fungi
- Division: Ascomycota
- Class: Lecanoromycetes
- Order: Graphidales
- Family: Gomphillaceae
- Genus: Diploschistella; Vain. (1926)

Type species
- Diploschistella urceolata Vain. (1926)

Species
- D. athalloides D. lithophila D. solorinelliformis D. trapperi D. urceolata

Genus of fungi

Diploschistella is a genus of fungi in the family Gomphillaceae.

== Species ==
As of July 2024, Species Fungorum (in the Catalogue of Life) accepts five species of Diploschistella:

- Diploschistella athalloides (Nyl.) Lücking, Knudsen & Fryday (2007)
- Diploschistella lithophila (G.Thor & Vězda) Lücking, Sérus. & Vězda (2005)
- Diploschistella solorinelliformis (Vězda) Lücking, Sérus. & Vězda (2005)
- Diploschistella trapperi (Kalb & Vězda) Lücking, Sérus. & Vězda (2005)
- Diploschistella urceolata Vain. (1926)
