= Hippocrepidea =

Scientific classification
- Domain: Eukaryota
- Kingdom: Fungi
- Division: Ascomycota
- Class: Lecanoromycetes
- Order: Graphidales
- Family: Gomphillaceae
- Genus: Hippocrepidea; Sérus. (1997)

Type species
- Hippocrepidea nigra Sérus. (1997)

Genus of fungi

Hippocrepidea is a genus of fungi in the family Gomphillaceae. This is a monotypic genus, containing the single species Hippocrepidea nigra.
