= Psorotheciopsis =

Scientific classification
- Domain: Eukaryota
- Kingdom: Fungi
- Division: Ascomycota
- Class: Lecanoromycetes
- Order: Graphidales
- Family: Gomphillaceae
- Genus: Psorotheciopsis; Rehm (1900)

Type species
- Psorotheciopsis decipiens Rehm (1900)

Genus of lichen-forming fungi

Psorotheciopsis is a genus of lichenized fungi in the family Gomphillaceae. It contains three species.

== Species ==
- Psorotheciopsis albomaculans (Rehm) R.Sant. (1952)
- Psorotheciopsis decipiens Rehm (1900)
- Psorotheciopsis patellarioides (Rehm) R.Sant. (1952)
