= Sipmanidea =

Scientific classification
- Kingdom: Fungi
- Division: Ascomycota
- Class: Lecanoromycetes
- Order: Graphidales
- Family: Gomphillaceae
- Genus: Sipmanidea; Xavier-Leite, M.Cáceres & Lücking (2023)

Type species
- Sipmanidea neotropica (Lücking) Xavier-Leite, M.Cáceres & Lücking (2023)

Species
- S. furcata S. neotropica

Genus of lichens

Sipmanidea is a small genus of fungi in the family Gomphillaceae. It comprises two species of leaf-dwelling lichens.

== Taxonomy ==
The genus was circumscribed in 2023 by Amanda Xavier-Leite, Marcela Cáceres, and Robert Lücking. The type species of the genus is Sipmanidea neotropica, which was originally described as a subspecies of Echinoplaca furcata. Molecular phylogenetics analysis revealed that species previously classified within Echinoplaca actually formed two distinct clades, leading to the establishment of Sipmanidea as a separate genus. The genus was named in honour of Harrie Sipman, a prominent tropical lichenologist known for his work on foliicolous lichens.

The genus differs from related genera in several ways, particularly in its apothecial morphology and the characteristics of its ascospores. S. neotropica is distinguished from related species by its calenioid (crater-shaped) apothecia, while other species such as S. furcata display more echinoplacoid apothecia with a slightly raised thalline margin.

== Description ==
Sipmanidea lichens are small organisms that grow on the surface of living leaves in tropical forests. Their most distinctive features can be observed at both macroscopic and microscopic levels. The main body (thallus) of these lichens appears as a rough, warty crust on the leaf surface. It often has a whitish, frosted appearance, similar to a light dusting of powder. One of the most characteristic features is the presence of delicate, white, branching hair-like structures (setae) that emerge from a clear or translucent base layer (prothallus) that spreads across the leaf surface.

The reproductive organs (apothecia) of Sipmanidea are orange in colour and either emerge from the surface (erumpent) or sit flat against it (adnate). These structures are often rimmed with a white, crystalline coating made up of tiny needle-shaped crystals. Under a microscope, the spores (ascospores) can be seen to have multiple compartments divided by both vertical and horizontal walls, creating a muriform or "brick-wall" pattern.

Microscopic features in the genus include specialised reproductive structures called hyphophores, which are pale yellow and shaped like bristles. Another distinctive feature is the presence of specialised fungal threads (diaphyphae) that come in two forms: thick and thin. The thin threads end in swollen segments that resemble sperm cells, a characteristic that helps distinguish this genus from its relatives.

When examined microscopically, these lichens reveal several distinct layers: a colourless outer layer (excipulum) made up of fungal threads; a clear supporting tissue (hypothecium) with densely packed, parallel fungal threads; and an upper layer (epithecium) that appears yellowish-brown and has a granular texture. These features, particularly the combination of branched setae, crystalline coating, and specialised reproductive structures, make Sipmanidea distinct from other closely related lichen genera.

== Species ==
- Sipmanidea furcata (Sérus.) Xavier-Leite, M.Cáceres & Lücking (2023)
- Sipmanidea neotropica (Lücking) Xavier-Leite, M.Cáceres & Lücking (2023)
