= Paragyalideopsis =

Scientific classification
- Kingdom: Fungi
- Division: Ascomycota
- Class: Lecanoromycetes
- Order: Graphidales
- Family: Gomphillaceae
- Genus: Paragyalideopsis; Etayo (2017)

Type species
- Paragyalideopsis floridae (Etayo & Diederich) Etayo (2017)

Genus of fungi

Paragyalideopsis is a genus of fungi in the family Gomphillaceae. One species is called Paragyalideopsis floridae, and occurs in Florida.

== Species ==
As of April 2023, Species Fungorum (in the Catalogue of Life) accept four species of Paragyalideopsis.

- Paragyalideopsis breussii Etayo (2017)
- Paragyalideopsis floridae (Etayo & Diederich) Etayo (2017)
- Paragyalideopsis minuta Etayo (2017)
- Paragyalideopsis stereocaulicola (Etayo) Etayo (2017)
