= Taitaia =

Scientific classification
- Kingdom: Fungi
- Division: Ascomycota
- Class: Lecanoromycetes
- Order: Graphidales
- Family: Gomphillaceae
- Genus: Taitaia; Suija, Kaasalainen, Kirika & Rikkinen (2018)
- Species: T. aurea

Binomial name
- Taitaia aurea Suija, Kaasalainen, Kirika & Rikkinen (2018)

Single-species lichen genus

Taitaia is a single-species fungal genus in the family Gomphillaceae. It was circumscribed in 2018 to contain the species Taitaia aurea, a lichenicolous (lichen-dwelling) fungus. This species is characterized by aggregated ascomata with yellow margins, and salmon-red discs that originate from a single base. It is known only from a few sites in Kenya's tropical lower-mountain forests, where it grows on thalli of the lichen Crocodia.

== Taxonomy ==
Taitaia aurea was first formally described by mycologists Ave Suija, Ulla Kaasalainen, Paul Kirika, and Jouko Rikkinen. The genus name Taitaia is derived from the Taita Hills in Kenya, where the species was first discovered. The species epithet aurea is a reference to the golden yellow colour of the margins of the fungal fruiting bodies. Molecular analysis showed Taitaia to be most closely related to the lichenised, saxicolous species Gyalidea fritzei, and both species form a clade that is sister to the lichenicolous Corticifraga peltigerae. Taitaia was later resolved as monophyletic in a 2022 molecular-phylogenetic revision of the family Gomphillaceae.

The type specimen was found in Taita-Taveta Province, near the summit of Vuria in a dense moist forest populated with Maesa lanceolata, Nuxia congesta and Dracaena afromontana. It was discovered growing on the thallus of the foliose lichen Crocodia cf. clathrata, which was itself growing on the stem of a woody vine.

== Description ==
Taitaia aurea is a lichenicolous fungus, meaning it lives symbiotically with lichens. The fungus forms apothecioid ascomata, or fungal fruiting bodies, that break through the host lichen's thallus (its vegetative body). These ascomata can group together, sometimes ten or more budding from a single base. They start off closed and then open with the edges rolling outwards to reveal a salmon-red disc. The margin of the ascoma is golden yellow, earning the species its 'aurea' name.

The hymenium, or fertile layer of the ascoma, comprises unitunicate, non-amyloid asci (sac-like structures in which spores are formed), and simple, septate paraphyses. The ascospores produced by Taitaia aurea are fusiform (spindle-shaped) and contain a single septum.

== Habitat and distribution ==
The fungus is obligately lichenicolous, implying it exclusively grows on lichens, in this case, on the thalli of Crocodia cf. clathrata. The ascomata can burst through the host thallus without causing any discernible harm to the mycobiont (the fungal component of the lichen) or the photobiont (the photosynthetic component).

At the time of its publication, Taitaia aurea was known only from two locations in Kenya, both within tropical lower-mountain forests.

== Ecology ==
Inside the host lichen, the vegetative hyphae (filamentous structures) of Taitaia aurea can weave between the medullary hyphae of the host. They are slightly narrower than those of the host and can be traced for some distance. The ascomata of Taitaia aurea are closely associated with the internal cephalodia of the host, structures containing a nitrogen-fixing cyanobacterium called Nostoc. While the fungus's vegetative hyphae are seen on the surfaces of the cephalodia, they do not appear to penetrate these structures.
