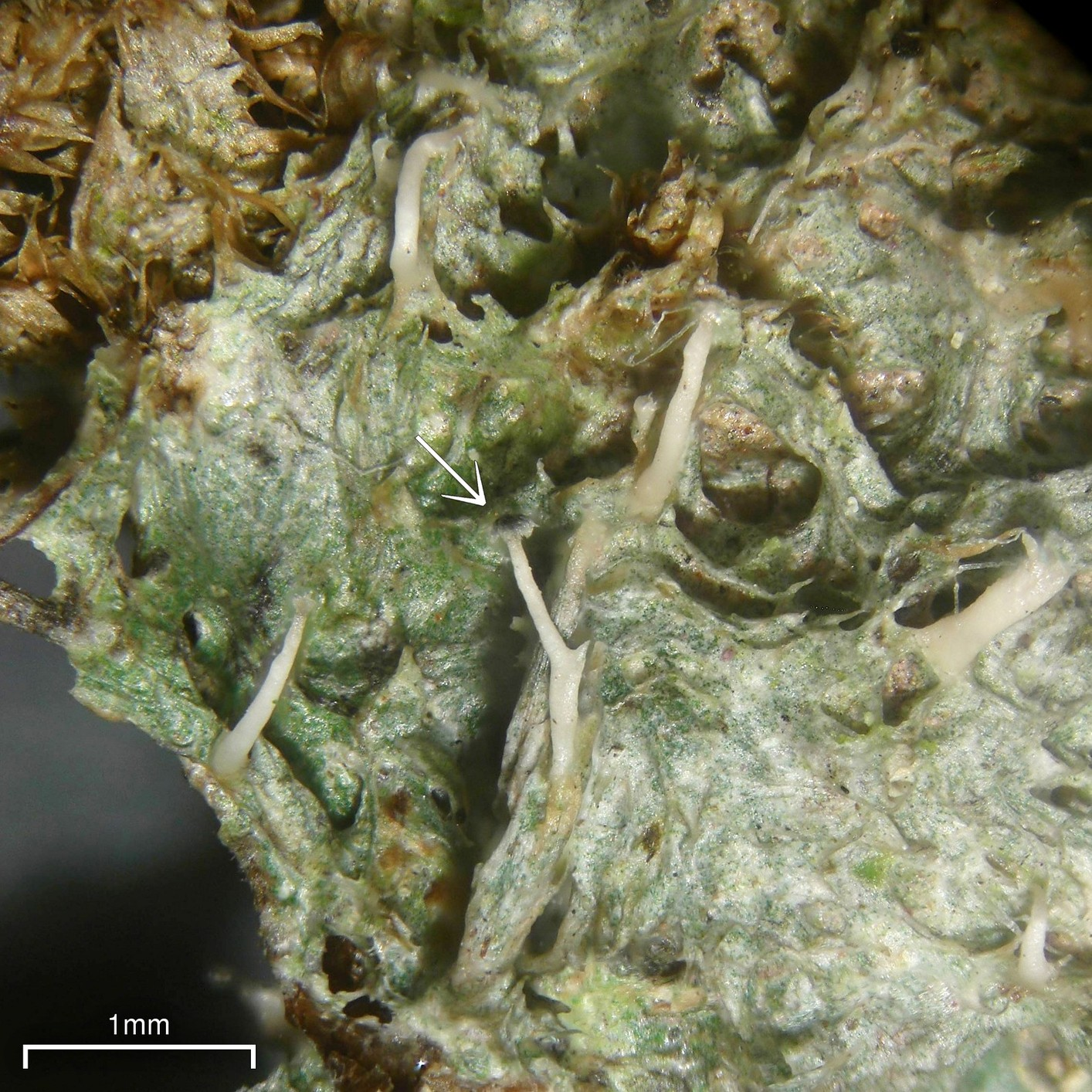
- Gomphillus americanus

Scientific classification
- Kingdom: Fungi
- Division: Ascomycota
- Class: Lecanoromycetes
- Order: Graphidales
- Family: Gomphillaceae; Walt.Watson (1929)

Type genus
- Gomphillus Nyl. (1855)

Synonyms
- Gomphillaceae Walt.Watson ex Hafellner (1984)

= Gomphillaceae =

Family of mostly lichen-forming fungi

The Gomphillaceae are a family of mostly lichen-forming fungi in the order Graphidales. They occur mainly in tropical regions, where many species are adapted to humid rainforests and grow directly on leaves rather than on bark or rock. The family contains about 46 genera and more than 800 species, although the true total may be higher because genetic work has revealed extensive cryptic diversity. Many members reproduce using specialised structures and produce few or none of the lichen products that are typical of other lichen groups. A major molecular phylogenetics-led reorganisation in 2023 formalised this revised classification, recognising and establishing 17 genera as new or reinstated.

== Taxonomy ==
The Gomphillaceae has undergone considerable taxonomic revision as molecular analysis techniques have improved scientists' understanding of relationships between species. As of 2024, the family includes approximately 440 accepted species, of which 422 are lichenised (form a symbiotic relationship with algae) and 18 are lichenicolous or fungicolous (grow on other lichens or fungi).

Before DNA-based approaches became common in this group, a major step in defining Gomphillaceae was the 1987 revision by Antonín Vězda and Josef Poelt. They noted that earlier classifications had often scattered many of these foliicolous lichens across other families, particularly Asterothyriaceae, reflecting the lack of a coherent morphology-based framework for the group. Building on the then-recent recognition of the family, they expanded Gomphillaceae from a single-genus concept centred on Gomphillus to a broader assemblage that also included Aulaxina, Calenia, Echinoplaca, Gyalectidium, Gyalideopsis, Tricharia, Actinoplaca, and the newly described genera Bullatina and Caleniopsis. They emphasized shared anatomical traits (including two-layered, "splitting" asci) and the presence of hyphophores, distinctive asexual structures bearing tufts of specialised hyphae and sometimes incorporating algal cells, as practical characters for separating genera. Their paper provided an emended family diagnosis and a key to the genera with brief generic accounts and species lists, giving a morphology-based baseline.

Recent molecular phylogenetics studies (analysis of DNA sequences to determine evolutionary relationships) have led to a major reorganisation of the family's classification. The research identified 46 distinct genera, including 19 newly recognised lineages. This represents a significant expansion from the previous understanding of the family's diversity. A challenge in classifying members of this family is that only about 27% of known species have had their DNA sequenced. To address this, researchers have used a technique called "phylogenetic binning", which uses physical characteristics to predict where unsequenced species fit within the phylogenetic tree based on their similarities to sequenced relatives. The actual number of species in the family may be significantly higher than currently recognised, possibly exceeding 800 species. This is because detailed examination often reveals that what appears to be a single species may actually be several distinct but closely related species (known as cryptic species).

Recent (2024) sequencing work has filled one of the most persistent gaps in the family tree, with a two-gene phylogeny for the enigmatic Paratricharia paradoxa. The analysis showed that Paratricharia is sister to Caleniopsis, with the pair forming the earliest branch of a broadened Aulaxina clade that also contains Aulaxina and Aulaxinella. This placement corroborates earlier morphology-based predictions and removes Paratricharia from any close relationship with Tricharia in the strict sense or the independently evolved "black-setae" lineages Microxyphiomyces and Santricharia. Because the study emphasised apothecial architecture as a better indicator of deep relationships than the presence of sterile black bristles, several "setae-bearing" genera are now recognised as the result of convergent evolution rather than shared ancestry.

A global multilocus phylogeny published in 2025 greatly expanded sampling across the family, analysing 2,207 sequences from 1,256 specimens from major tropical biodiversity hotspots. Using an integrative species-delimitation approach, the study recovered 473 putative species, of which only 104 corresponded to previously described names; 213 represented cryptic or near-cryptic lineages and 100 were phenotypically distinct new species. The authors estimated total family richness at about 1,861–2,356 species worldwide, indicating that the currently named species represent only part of Gomphillaceae diversity. The same study also recovered three major lineages within a broadly circumscribed Gomphillaceae, corresponding to the former Solorinellaceae, Asterothyriaceae, and Gomphillaceae sensu stricto, although formal recognition of these clades at subfamily rank was deferred to a later paper.

== Description ==
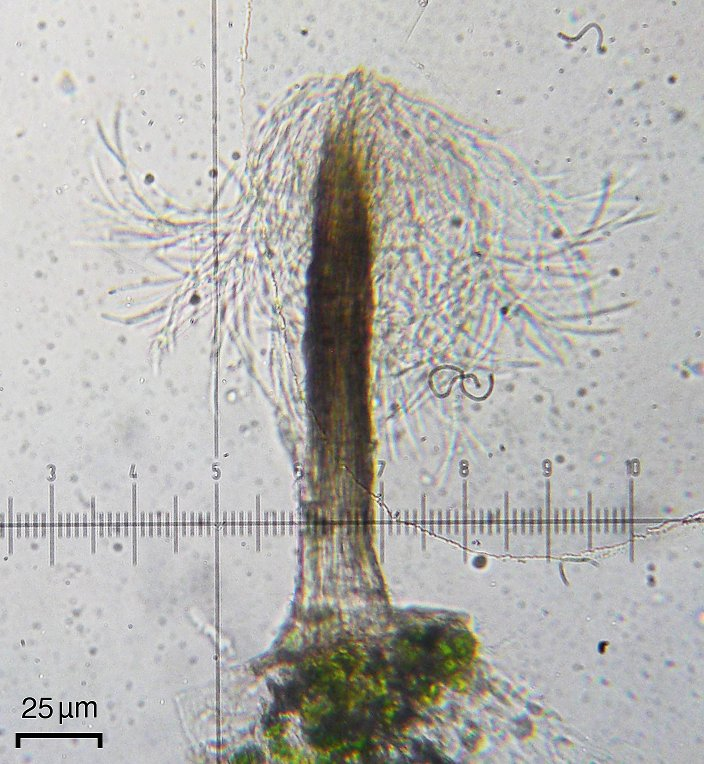
Microscopic view of a hyphophore from Tricharia santessonii

The family Gomphillaceae is characterized by its crust-like thallus, which is the outer layer of the lichen body. These lichens contain chlorococcoid photobionts, which are symbiotic algae that help the lichen to produce food through photosynthesis. The reproductive structures of Gomphillaceae lichens, known as ascomata, can be apothecioid or lirellate in form. Apothecia occur in a few forms, including biatorine or zeorine to sometimes lecideine.

The internal structure of hymenium (the fertile, spore-producing part of the lichen), called the hamathecium, consists primarily of branched and interwoven paraphyses. The asci, or spore-producing sacs, are annelasceous and feature a distinctive apical tholus and ring structure. They can be clavate, oblong, or fusiform in shape and do not exhibit any amyloid properties. These asci typically produce eight ascospores, although some may produce fewer, ranging from one to four spores. The ascospores are hyaline (transparent), and have thin walls and distinct distosepta. They can be ellipsoid or oblong in shape, and their internal divisions (septa) can be transverse or muriform.

Gomphillaceae lichens also produce conidiomata, which are asexual reproductive structures. These are mostly hyphophores, and the conidia are formed as branched hyphae, called diahyphae, within gelatinous masses. The conidia are typically septate, often taking on a moniliform or bead-like appearance, and are also hyaline. In terms of secondary chemistry, Gomphillaceae lichens generally lack any notable substances.

== Habitat and distribution ==
The family is most diverse in tropical regions, where many species grow on living leaves in wet forests. A 2025 global study found that most Gomphillaceae species have much more restricted distributions than had previously been assumed: most were confined to a single territory or floristic realm, and only three species - Echinoplaca epiphylla, Gyalectidium imperfectum, and Sporocybomyces leucotrichoides - were recovered across the three major tropical lichenogeographical regions.

Biogeographical analyses in the 2025 global phylogeny favoured long-distance dispersal and founder event speciation over ancient Gondwanan vicariance. The family appears most likely to have originated in the Neotropics, and many of the inferred intercontinental dispersal events took place during the Miocene.

== Genera ==
According to a recent (2024) compilation of fungal classification, the Gomphillaceae comprise 44 genera and about 340 species. The following list indicates the genus name, the taxonomic authority, year of publication, and the number of species:

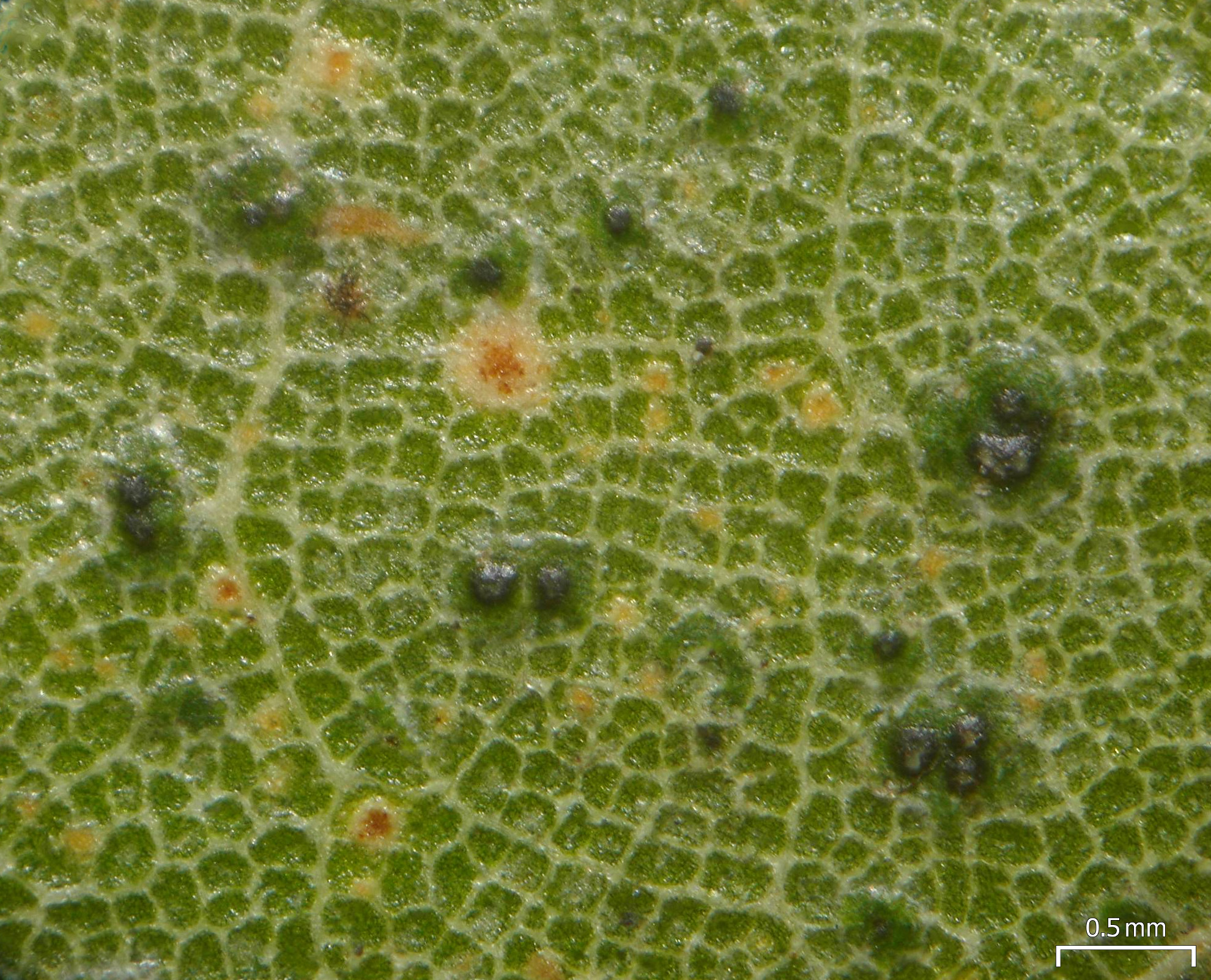
Asterothyrium decipiens

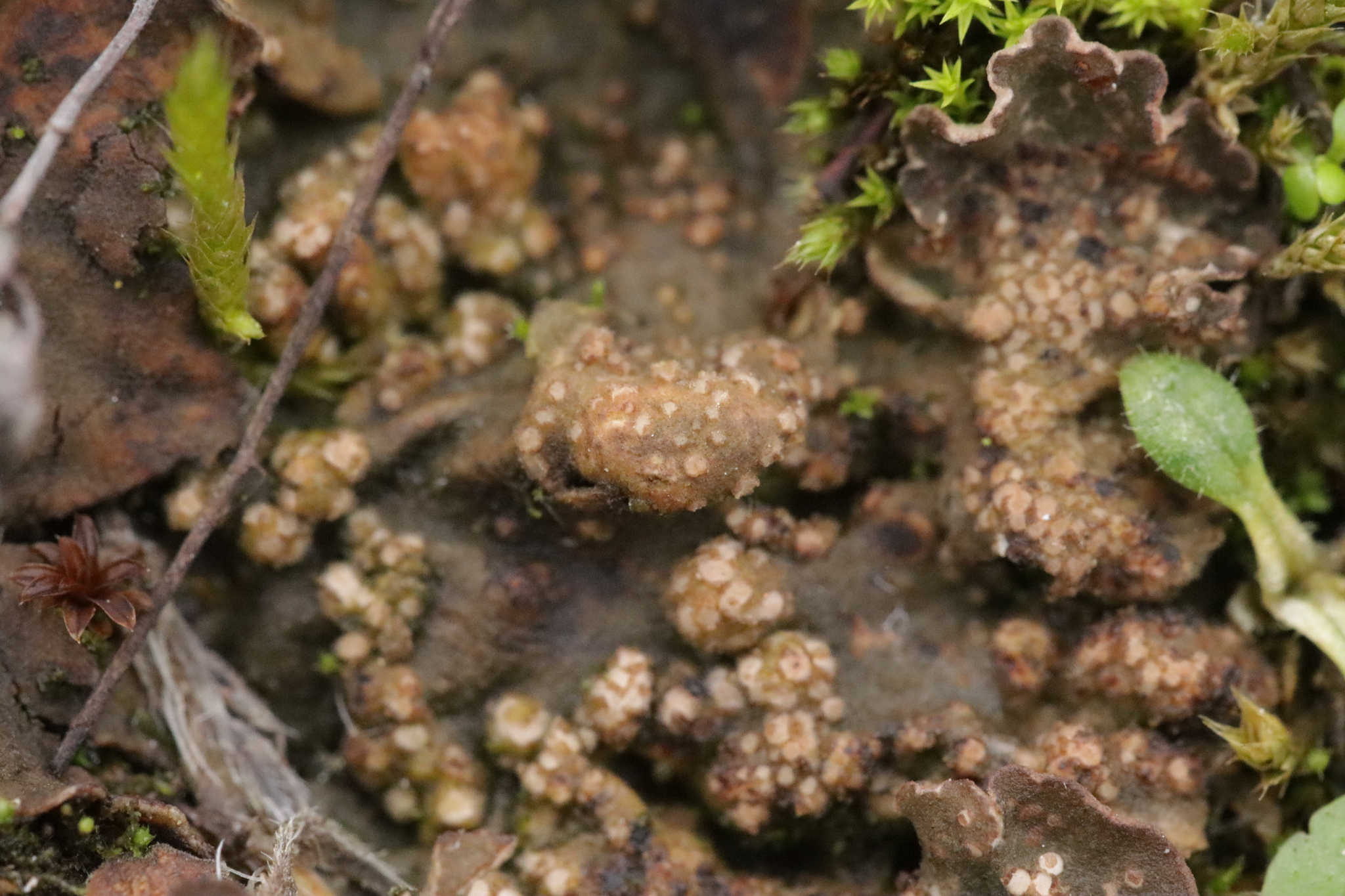
Corticifraga fuckelii

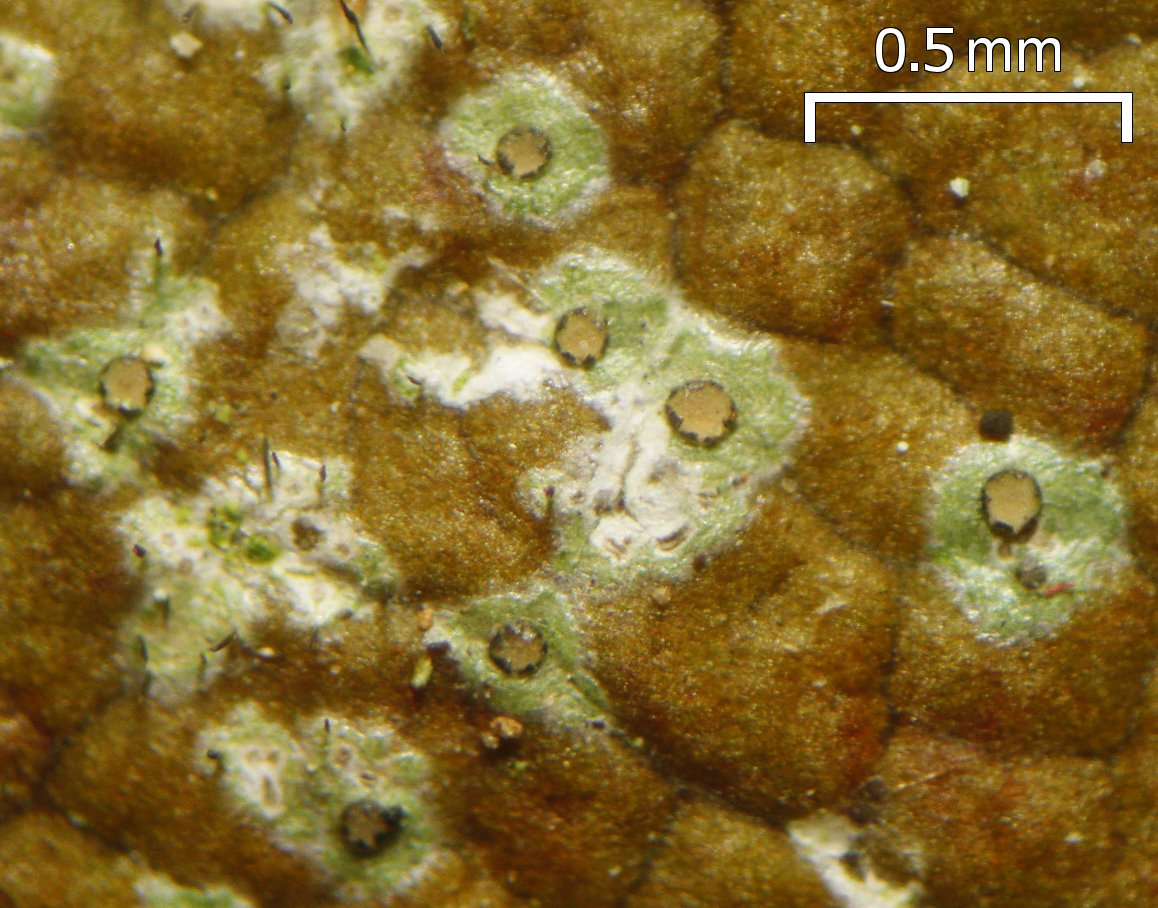
Microxyphiomyces santessonii

- Actinoplaca Müll.Arg. (1891) – 2 spp.
- Adelphomyces Xavier-Leite, M.Cáceres & Lücking (2023) – 3 spp.
- Aderkomyces Bat. (1961) – 30 spp.
- Aplanocalenia Lücking, Sérus. & Vězda (2005) – 1 sp.
- Aptrootidea Xavier-Leite, M.Cáceres & Lücking (2023) – 6 spp.
- Arthotheliopsis Vain. (1896) – 5 spp.
- Asterothyrium Müll.Arg. (1890) – 12 spp.
- Aulaxina Fée (1825) – 4 spp.
- Aulaxinella Xavier-Leite, M.Cáceres & Lücking (2023) – 3 spp.
- Batistomyces Xavier-Leite, M.Cáceres & Lücking (2023) – 2 spp.
- Bezerroplaca Xavier-Leite, M.Cáceres & Lücking (2023) – 5 spp.
- Calenia Müll.Arg. (1890) – 20 spp.
- Caleniella Xavier-Leite, M.Cáceres & Lücking (2023) – 2 spp.
- Caleniopsis Vězda & Poelt (1987) – 2 spp.
- Cladosterigma Pat. (1892) – 2 spp.
- Corticifraga D.Hawksw. & R.Sant. (1990) – 9 spp.
- Diploschistella Vain. (1926) – 5 spp.
- Echinoplaca Fée (1825) – 20 spp.
- Ferraroa Lücking, Sérus. & Vězda (2005) – 1 sp.
- Gomphillus Nyl. (1855) – 4 spp.
- Gyalectidium Müll.Arg. (1881) – 40 spp.
- Gyalidea Lettau ex Vězda (1996) – 30 spp.
- Gyalideopsis Vězda (1972) – 50 spp.
- Hippocrepidea Sérus. (1997) – 1 sp.
- Jamesiella Lücking, Sérus. & Vězda (2005) – 4 spp.
- Lithogyalideopsis Lücking, Sérus. & Vězda (2005) – 4 spp.
- Microxyphiomyces Bat., Valle & Peres (1961) – 15 spp.
- Monocalenia Xavier-Leite, M.Cáceres & Lücking (2023) – 1 sp.
- Paragyalideopsis Etayo (2017) – 4 spp.
- Paratricharia Lücking (1997) – 1 spp.
- Phyllogyalidea Lücking & Aptroot (2008) – 2 spp.
- Psathyromyces Bat. & Peres (1964) – 4 spp.
- Pseudocalenia Xavier-Leite, M.Cáceres & Lücking (2023) – 1 sp.
- Psorotheciopsis Rehm (1900) – 7 spp.
- Rolueckia Papong, Thammath. & Boonpr. (2008) – 3 spp.
- Roselviria Xavier-Leite, M.Cáceres & Lücking (2023) – 2 spp.
- Santricharia Xavier-Leite, M.Cáceres & Lücking (2023) – 1 sp.
- Sipmanidea Xavier-Leite, M.Cáceres & Lücking (2023) – 2 spp.
- Spinomyces Bat. & Peres ex Xavier-Leite, M.Cáceres & Lücking (2023) – 9 spp.
- Sporocybomyces H.Maia (1967) – 4 spp.
- Taitaia Suija, Kaasalainen, Kirika & Rikkinen (2018) – 1 spp.
- Tricharia Fée (1825) – ca. 30 spp.
- Verruciplaca Xavier-Leite, M.Cáceres & Lücking (2023) – 2 spp.
- Vezdamyces Xavier-Leite, M.Cáceres & Lücking (2023) – 2 spp.
