= Batistiaceae =

Scientific classification
- Kingdom: Fungi
- Division: Ascomycota
- Class: incertae sedis
- Order: incertae sedis
- Family: Batistiaceae; Samuels & K.F.Rodrigues (1989)

Type genus
- Batistia Cif. (1958)

Family of fungi

The Batistiaceae are a family of fungi in the division Ascomycota. The family was described by Gary Samuels and Katia Rodrigues in 1989 to contain the genus Batistia and its sole species Batistia annulipes. The anarph form of this fungus has been named Acrostroma annellosynnema. Batistia annulipes was originally described from French Guiana, and was later found in other locations in South America and in Panama.

== See also ==
- List of Ascomycota families incertae sedis
