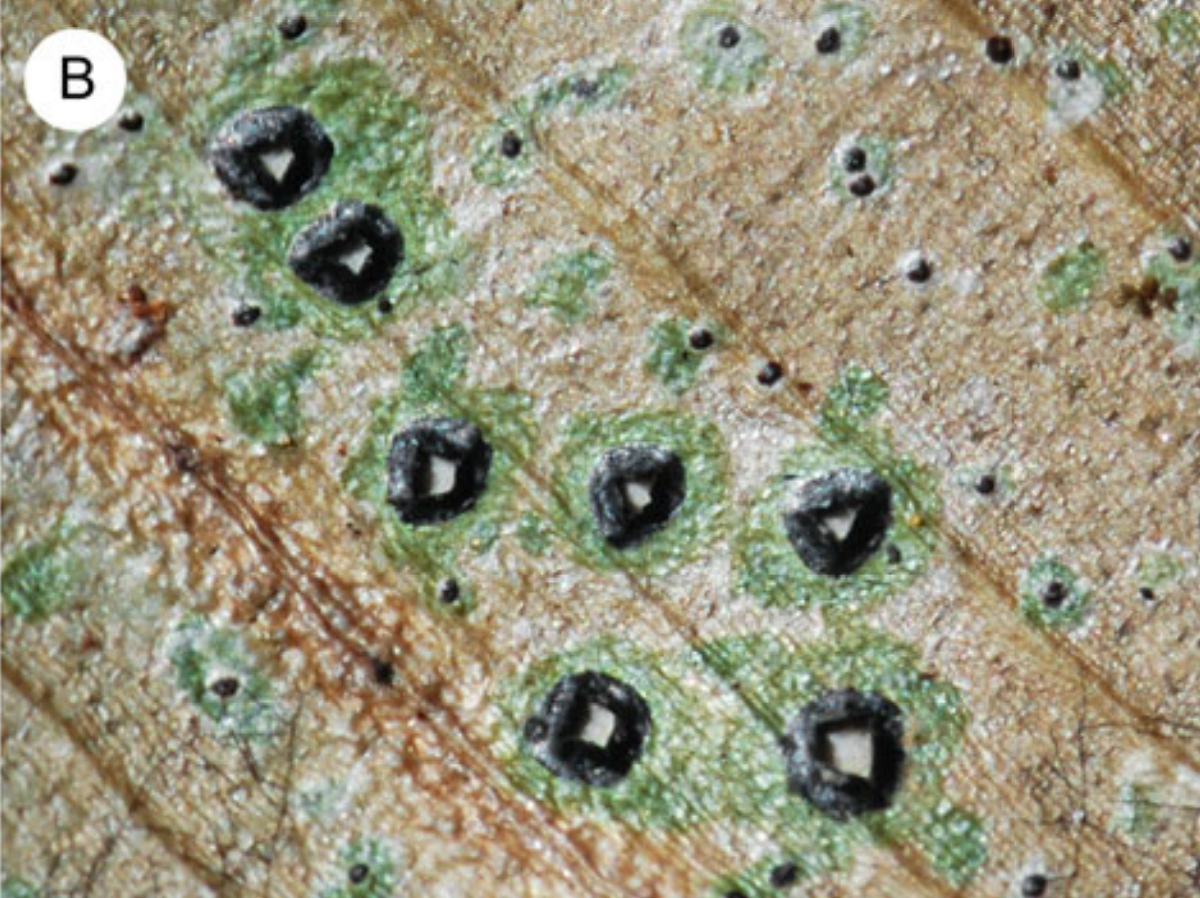
- Aulaxina submuralis

Scientific classification
- Kingdom: Fungi
- Division: Ascomycota
- Class: Lecanoromycetes
- Order: Graphidales
- Family: Gomphillaceae
- Genus: Aulaxina; Fée (1825)

Type species
- Aulaxina opegraphina Fée (1825)

Species
- See text

= Aulaxina =

Genus of lichen-forming fungi

Aulaxina is a genus of lichen-forming fungi in the family Gomphillaceae. Species of Aulaxina are found predominantly in humid tropical forests across Africa, Asia, and the Americas, where they grow on the surface of living leaves, a foliicolous lifestyle. The genus is recognised by its distinctive blackish fruiting bodies, which open in a star-like or slit-like pattern, and by the small dark hairs and club-shaped reproductive structures that dot the thallus surface. The exact number of species in the genus is uncertain, as different taxonomic databases currently disagree on which names are accepted, and the boundaries of several species remain to be clarified.

== Taxonomy ==
The genus was circumscribed in 1825 by the French lichenologist Antoine Laurent Apollinaire Fée, who treated Aulaxina opegraphina as the type species. In the protologue, he illustrated the lichen on a leaf fragment and described the thallus as thin and membranous, with many small thalli. He also drew a magnified detail to show the triangular apothecia, which he described as opening at the top and occurring only in very small numbers, borne on grooved striate, rounded (orbicular) thalli.

Molecular phylogenetics analyses using mitochondrial (mtSSU) and nuclear (nrLSU) ribosomal markers recover Aulaxina (in the strict sense, or sensu stricto) in an "Aulaxina clade" together with Aulaxinella; in that analysis, the sister group to this clade is a lineage formed by Paratricharia and Caleniopsis. In Gomphillaceae, apothecial characters tend to be more conserved than thallus traits and can therefore be more informative for placing taxa within larger clades.

== Description ==
Aulaxina comprises thin, crustose lichens that grow on the surface of living leaves in humid tropical forests. The thallus forms small, greyish to whitish patches on a delicate, algae-free prothallus. From this arise minute, erect, black thallus hairs, typically up to about 0.2 mm high, which are sterile and lack algal cells. The photobiont is a unicellular, chlorococcoid green alga arranged in a single layer within the thallus.

The fruiting bodies (apothecia) are blackish and variable in outline, ranging from rounded or angular to elongate, lirellate and sometimes forked, and can resemble the lirellae of some species in the Opegraphaceae or Graphidaceae. In young apothecia the dark lateral exciple completely covers the disc, which later opens in a star-like or slit-like fashion to expose the hymenial surface. The apothecia are usually sessile with a somewhat constricted base. In vertical section, the lateral exciple is dark brown to black and often carbonised, while the hymenium is non-amyloid and traversed by numerous slender paraphyses that are richly branched and anastomosing – that is, forming an interconnected network. The asci each contain one or a few colourless, thin-walled ascospores that are transversely septate to muriform (divided by internal cross-walls), enclosed in a gelatinous outer layer that can make their edges appear indistinct when viewed in water mounts.

Species of Aulaxina also produce dark hyphophores, asexual reproductive structures that occur among the thallus hairs. These consist of very small, rod- to club-shaped black stalks, straight or slightly curved, arising mainly from the prothallus and terminating in a small head of densely packed, hyaline hyphae. When moistened, the outer hyphae swell and separate into chains or short segments that function as diaspores of the fungal partner. Differences in the form of the hyphophores and their propagules are useful for distinguishing species within the genus.

== Species ==
As of February 2026, Species Fungorum (in the Catalogue of Life) accepts eight species of Aulaxina, although several more than this have been published:

- Aulaxina africana (Vain.) Zahlbr. (1922) (= Opegrapha africana, MycoBank)
- Aulaxina aggregata Lücking & Kalb (2002)
- Aulaxina dictyospora R.Sant. (1952)
- Aulaxina epiphylla (Zahlbr.) R.Sant. (1952) (= Dictyographa epiphylla, MycoBank)
- Aulaxina insularis Vain (1921)
- Aulaxina intermedia Lücking (1997)
- Aulaxina microphana (Vain.) R.Sant. (1952) (= Bilimbia microphana, MycoBank)
- Aulaxina opegraphina Fée (1825)
- Aulaxina quadrangula (Stirt.) R.Sant. (1952)
- Aulaxina submuralis Kalb & Vězda (1988) – Brazil
- Aulaxina uniseptata R.Sant. (1952)
- Aulaxina unispor Sérus. (1978)
- Aulaxina velata Müll.Arg. (1890) (= Opegrapha velata, MycoBank)

Some species once classified in this genus have since been reclassified in Aulaxinella:

- Aulaxina corticola Kalb & Vězda (1988) = Aulaxinella corticola
- Aulaxina minuta R.Sant. (1952) = Aulaxinella minuta
- Aulaxina multiseptata R.Sant. (1952) = Aulaxinella multiseptata
