= Santricharia =

Scientific classification
- Kingdom: Fungi
- Division: Ascomycota
- Class: Lecanoromycetes
- Order: Graphidales
- Family: Gomphillaceae
- Genus: Santricharia; Xavier-Leite, M.Cáceres & Lücking (2023)
- Species: S. farinosa

Binomial name
- Santricharia farinosa (R.Sant.) Xavier-Leite, M.Cáceres & Lücking (2023)

Synonyms
- Tricharia farinosa R.Sant. (1952)

Genus of lichens

Santricharia is a fungal genus in the family Gomphillaceae. It is a monospecific genus, comprising the single species Santricharia farinosa, a leaf-dwelling lichen.

== Taxonomy ==
Santricharia was circumscribed by Amanda Xavier-Leite, Marcela Cáceres, and Robert Lücking in 2023. It contains a single species formerly placed in the genus Tricharia. Molecular analysis showed this species to be unrelated to Tricharia, but closely related to Rubrotricha, a genus with which it shares little apomorphy. The genus name honours the Swedish lichenologist Rolf Santesson, who originally described the type species in 1952.

== Description ==
Santricharia is a foliicolous (leaf-dwelling) lichen that forms a continuous thallus with a coarsely warted texture. The thallus is often accompanied by numerous black, sterile bristle-like structures (setae), giving it a distinctive appearance. A dark brown prothallus, a marginal layer of fungal tissue, is usually present at the edges of the thallus.

The reproductive structures, or apothecia, are either closely attached to the substrate (adnate) or slightly raised (broadly sessile). They belong to the lecideine type, meaning they lack a distinct thalline margin. Both the disc and the proper margin of the apothecia are covered in a thick, dark brown pruina, a powdery or granular coating. The excipulum, the protective layer surrounding the apothecium, consists of a dense, interwoven network of fungal hyphae (prosoplectenchyma) and is dark brown in colour. The hypothecium, the supportive tissue beneath the hymenium, shares the same interwoven structure but remains colourless. The epithecium, the uppermost layer of the hymenium, is also dark brown and has a granular texture.

The ascospores are muriform, meaning they are divided by multiple internal walls, creating a structure similar to a brick pattern. In addition to sexual reproduction, Santricharia also produces specialised asexual structures known as hyphophores, which appear as black, bristle-like projections. These structures bear diahyphae, chains of sausage-shaped fungal segments that detach and contribute to asexual reproduction.
