= Augusto Chaves Batista =

Brazilian mycologist (1916–1967)

Augusto Chaves Batista (15 June 1916 – 30 November 1967) was a Brazilian mycologist. He published more than 600 research papers, either alone or in collaboration with others. At the time of his death at the age of 51, Batista was the director of the Instituto de Micologia of the Federal University of Pernambuco.

== Eponymous taxa ==
Several taxa have been named in his honor, including Batistia, published by Raffaele Ciferri, a frequent collaborator.

- Antennulariella batistae
- Batistaella
- Batistamnus
- Batistia
- Batistiaceae
- Batistina
- Batistinula
- Batistomyces
- Batistopsora
- Batistospora
- Candida batistae
- Capnobatista
- Capnodium batistae
- Catenulaster batistae
- Collybia batistae
- Cyclotheca batistae
- Enterographa batistae
- Russula batistae

== See also ==
- Category:Taxa named by Augusto Chaves Batista
- List of mycologists
