= Calenia =

Scientific classification
- Domain: Eukaryota
- Kingdom: Fungi
- Division: Ascomycota
- Class: Lecanoromycetes
- Order: Graphidales
- Family: Gomphillaceae
- Genus: Calenia; Müll.Arg. (1890)

Type species
- Calenia depressa Müll.Arg. (1890)

Genus of lichens

Calenia is a genus of lichen-forming fungi within the family Gomphillaceae.

== Species ==
As of July 2024, Species Fungorum (in the Catalogue of Life) accepts 19 species of Calenia.

- Calenia atlantica M.Cáceres & Lücking (2008)
- Calenia bullatinoides Lücking (2001)
- Calenia chroodisciformis Lücking (2008)
- Calenia corticola (Henssen) L.I.Ferraro, Lücking & Sérus. (2001)
- Calenia depressa Müll.Arg. (1890)
- Calenia echinoplacoides Lücking (2008)
- Calenia flava Lücking, Sérus. & Sipman (2000)
- Calenia flavescens Z.F.Jia (2020) – China
- Calenia fumosa Lücking (2008)
- Calenia graphidea Vain. (1921)
- Calenia leptocarpa Vain. (1921)
- Calenia lueckingii C.Hartmann (1996) – Costa Rica
- Calenia obtecta Lücking (2008)
- Calenia pernambucensis M.Cáceres & Lücking (2008)
- Calenia phyllogena (Müll.Arg.) R.Sant. (1952)
- Calenia pseudographidea Lücking (2008)
- Calenia subdepressa Lücking (1997)
- Calenia surinamensis van den Boom & Sipman (2016)
- Calenia thelotremella Vain. (1921)
- Calenia verrucosa Z.F.Jia (2020) – China
