= Rolf Santesson =

Swedish lichenologist

- Born: Trollhättan, Sweden
- Died: Uppsala, Sweden
- Scientific career
- Fields: Lichenology
- Author abbrev. (botany): R.Sant.

Rolf Santesson (1916–2013) was a Swedish lichenologist and university lecturer. He was awarded the Acharius Medal in 1992 for his lifetime contributions to lichenology.

== Early life and education ==
Santesson was born in 1916 in Trollhättan, Sweden. He was already collecting lichens as a student, investigating the lichen flora of the table mountains of Halleberg and Hunneberg near his home. He entered the University of Uppsala in the 1930s to study botany. It was here he met the flamboyant Professor of Plant Ecology and lichen taxonomist Gustaf Einar Du Rietz, with whom he undertook studies on crustose lichens found on shoreline rocks of Swedish lakes. This work led to a lifelong interest in marine lichens. He earned a B.Sc. in 1938, followed by an M.Sc. in 1939.

That same year, joined by zoologist Christian Olrog, Santesson embarked on what was supposed to be an eight-month research excursion in Patagonia (southern South America). Because of the outbreak of war, which made sea travel unsafe, it instead lasted almost two years. Santesson was able to make comprehensive collections with detailed field note-books. Olrog wrote a book in Swedish about their trip called Destination Eldslandet (1943), which tracked the adventures of the expedition. After his return Santesson worked on taxonomic treatments of the material he collected from South America, which resulted in the revision of several genera, including Menegazzia, Cladina, Dolichocarpus, Xanthopeltis, and calicioid lichens. His work on Menegazzia has been called "an important and basic landmark in South American lichenology".

== Career ==
In 1946 he moved to Uppsala, where he worked from 1946 to 1950 as an assistant teacher, and from 1953 to 1958 as associate professor at the University of Uppsala. From 1937 to 1946 he was assistant at the Swedish Museum of Natural History in Stockholm. Between 1938 and 1954 he edited and distributed the exsiccata Lichenes Austroamericani ex herbario Regnelliano. In 1952, Santesson became a Ph.D., defending a doctoral dissertation on foliicolous lichens.

From 1973 to 1981, Santesson was professor and director of the Botanical Department at Stockholm's Swedish Museum of Natural History. After his retirement in 1982, Santesson continued working at the Botanical Museum in Uppsala, where he researched lichen parasites as well as helped compile several editions of the book series Lichens of Sweden and Norway. Santesson undertook major lichen-collecting expeditions throughout the world, including Europe (British Isles, France, Madeira, Portugal, Switzerland, Spain); North America (United States; Mexico) Tenerife; Iceland; Africa (Kenya and Tanzania); South America (Patagonia; Peru); and Asia (China; Far East of Russia). Between 1984 and 2008 he distributed the exsiccata series Fungi lichenicoli exsiccati.

== Recognition ==
Santesson has been recognized for his intuitive approach in assessing phylogenetic relationships amongst lichens. As Robert Lücking has noted, "he was the first to predict that species with different ascospores but otherwise similar characters, so-called sporomorphs, form closely related series." Although this concept had been largely neglected by other taxonomists, his theory was validated decades later with the use of molecular phylogenetics in the genus Thelotrema.

Santesson was awarded the Acharius Medal in 1992 for his lifetime contributions to lichenology. He had a Festschrift dedicated to him for his 80th birthday in 1997. He was a member of the Royal Swedish Academy of Sciences and an Honorary Member of the British Lichen Society.

=== Eponymy ===
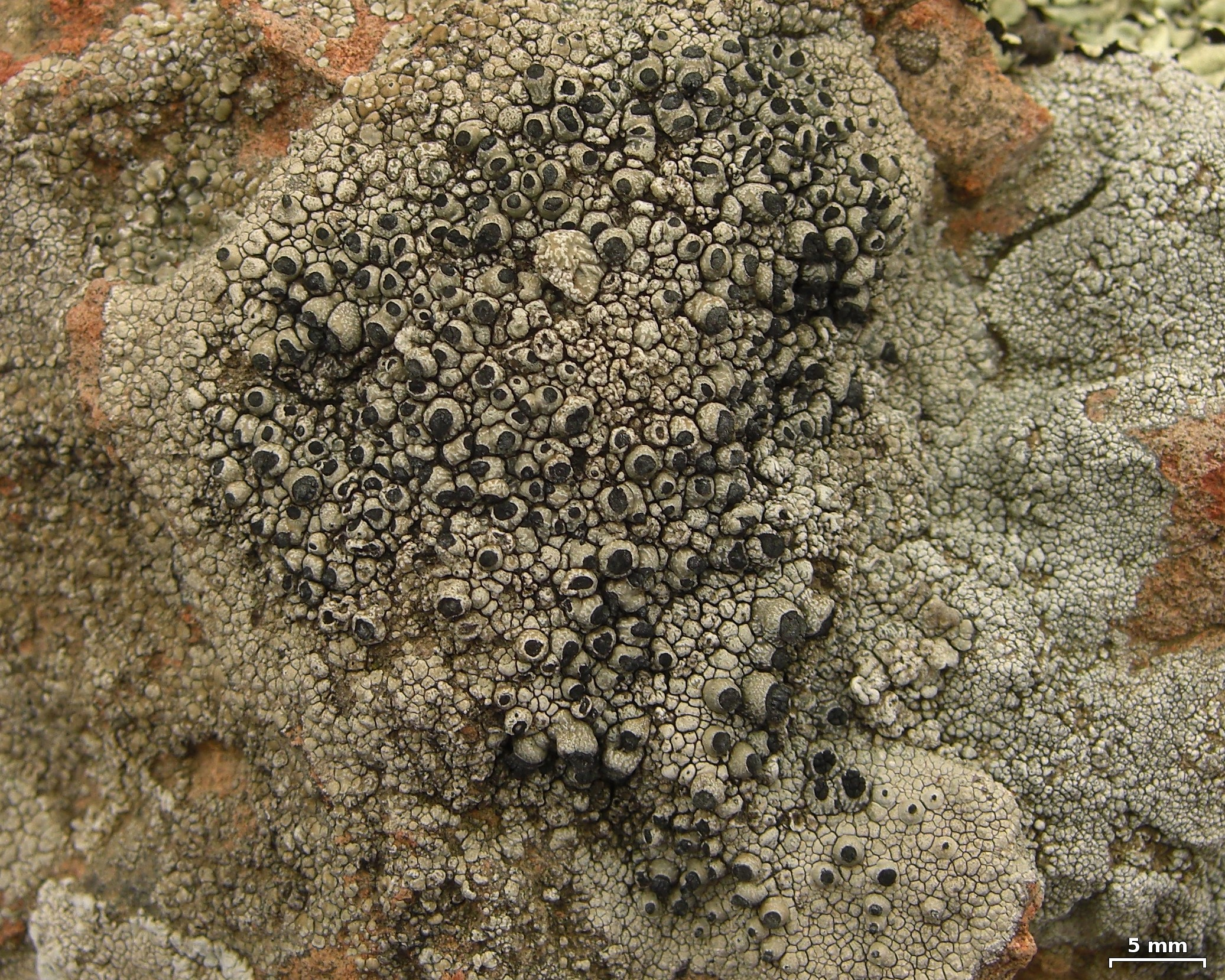
Thelomma santessonii is one of many lichens named after Santesson.

Santesson has had five genera named in his honour:

- Rolfidium Moberg (1986)
- Santessonia Hale & G.Vobig (1978)
- Santessoniella Henssen (1997)
- Santessoniolichen Tomas. & Cif. (1952)
- Santricharia Xavier-Leite, M.Cáceres & Lücking (2023)

Many species have been named after Santesson, including the following: Arthonia santessoniana Wedin & Hafellner (1998); Arthonia santessonii Matzer (1996); Ascochyta santessonii Alstrup & D.Hawksw. (1990); Bachmanniomyces santessonii Etayo (2010); Capronia santessoniana Etayo (2010); Cecidiomyces santessonii U.Braun & Zhurb. (2012); Chroodiscus santessonii Lücking (1991); Collema santessonii Degel. (1974); Corticifraga santessonii Zhurb. & Zavarzin (2007); Fellhanera santessonii Barillas & Lücking (1992); Halecania santessonii M.P.Andreev (2010); Hobsonia santessonii Lowen & D.Hawksw. (1986); Karschia santessonii Hafellner (1979); Laurera santessonii Letr.-Gal. (1958); Lecidea santessonii Hertel (1997); Lettauia santessonii Ihlen & Tønsberg (1996); Micropeltopsis santessonii P.M.Kirk & Spooner (1990); Nectriella santessonii Lowen & D.Hawksw. (1986); Odontotrema santessonii Zhurb., Etayo & Diederich (2002); Opegrapha santessonii Sérus. (1985); Pannaria rolfii Elvebakk (2012); Pannaria santessonii Elvebakk 2011); Pannaria santessonii Swinscow & Krog (1986); Peltula santessonii Swinscow & Krog (1979); Physcia rolfii Moberg (1990); Porina santessonii Makhija, Adaw. & Patw. (1995); Pronectria rolfiana Etayo (2010); Protothelenella santessonii H.Mayrhofer (1987); Pseudocyphellaria santessonii D.J.Galloway (1986); Pyrenidium santessonii Lücking (1998); Rhizocarpon santessonii Timdal (1986); Sticta santessonii D.J.Galloway (1994); Stirtonia santessonii Makhija & Patw. (1987); Taeniolella rolfii Diederich & Zhurb. (1997); Taeniolella santessonii Etayo & Heuchert (2010); Thelomma santessonii Tibell (1976); Thelotrema santessonii Hale (1973); Tremella santessonii Diederich (1994); Tricharia santessoniana Kalb & Vězda (1988); Tricharia santessonii D.Hawksw. (1972); Usnea santessonii Räsänen (1932); Verrucaria santessonii Erichsen (1941); Vouauxiomyces santessonii D.Hawksw. (1981); Xanthoparmelia santessonii T.H.Nash & Elix (1995); and Zwackhiomyces rolfii Etayo (2010).

== Selected publications ==
Santesson had more than 70 scientific publications. Some of his major works are listed below:

- Santesson, R. (1939). Über die Zonationsverhältnisse der lakustrinen Flechten einiger Seen im Anebodagebiet. Meddelanden från Lunds universitets limnologiska institution (in German). Vol. 1. pp. 1–70.
- —————— (1939). "Amphibious pyrenolichens". Arkiv för Botanik. 29A (10): 1–67.
- —————— (1942). "The South American Menegazziae". Arkiv för Botanik. 30A (11): 1–35.
- —————— (1952). Foliicolous lichens. I. A revision of the taxonomy of the obligately foliicolous, lichenized fungi. Symbolae Botanicae Upsalienses. Vol. 12. pp. 1–590.
- —————— (1984). The Lichens of Sweden and Norway. Stockholm and Uppsala: Swedish Museum of Natural History. ISBN 9789186510008.
- —————— (1993). The Lichens and Lichenicolous Fungi of Sweden and Norway. Lund: SBT-förlaget. ISBN 978-9197125581.
- Santesson, R.; Moberg, R.; Nordin, A.; Tønsberg, T.; Vitikainen, O. (2004). Lichen-forming & Lichenicolous Fungi of Fennoscandia. Uppsala: Museum of Evolution, University of Uppsala. ISBN 978-9197286367.

== See also ==
- Category:Taxa named by Rolf Santesson
