= Caleniopsis =

Scientific classification
- Domain: Eukaryota
- Kingdom: Fungi
- Division: Ascomycota
- Class: Lecanoromycetes
- Order: Graphidales
- Family: Gomphillaceae
- Genus: Caleniopsis; Vèzda & Poelt

Type species
- Caleniopsis laevigata (Müll. Arg.) Vězda & Poelt

Genus of fungi

Caleniopsis is a genus of fungi in the family Gomphillaceae.
