= Antonín Vězda =

Czech lichenologist

- Born: 25 November 1920; Brno, Czechoslovakia
- Died: 10 November 2008 (aged 87); Brno, Czech Republic
- Education: Masaryk University; Czechoslovak Academy of Sciences
- Awards: Acharius Medal (1992)
- Scientific career
- Fields: Lichenology
- Workplaces: Czechoslovak Academy of Sciences
- Author abbrev. (botany): Vězda

Antonín (Toni) Vězda (25 November 1920 – 10 November 2008) was a Czech lichenologist. After completing a university education that was postponed by World War II, Vězda taught botany at the Czech University of Life Sciences. In 1958, he was dismissed from his university position as a result of the restrictions placed on academic freedoms by the communist regime in power. He eventually was hired as a lichen researcher by the Czechoslovak Academy of Sciences, who allowed him to work from his apartment, which served also as an office and herbarium.

Vězda was a productive worker, publishing nearly 400 scientific papers between 1948 and 2008, most solitarily, describing hundreds of new taxa, and building up a herbarium collection of more than 300,000 specimens. He was praised for his series of exsiccates – sets of dried herbarium specimens – assembled with both local species as well as samples sent to him from colleagues throughout the world. Known as an outstanding taxonomist, he was awarded an Acharius Medal in 1992 for his lifetime contributions to lichenology. Two genera and twenty-four species have been named in honour of Vězda.

== Biography ==
Vězda was born in Brno on 25 November 1920. His father, a printer, was interested in horticulture and mycology, which may have helped spur an early interest in natural history. Vězda qualified to enter university in 1940, but the German occupation of Czechoslovakia during World War II made it impossible for him to study. In 1945 he became an assistant to Alois Zlatník (dendrologist in the Faculty of Agriculture and Forestry at the Czech University of Life Sciences Prague) and at the same time began study of natural history at Masaryk University in Brno. He earned two diplomas, in science and in forestry, from this institution in 1947. In 1951 he completed a diploma in forestry engineering at the Agricultural University as a forest engineer, and started teaching forest botany at this institution. Vězda, like many other academics at that time, was dismissed from university for political reasons in 1958, as they were considered untrustworthy by the communist regime in power. With his academic freedoms thus restricted, he worked as a forester. After studying at the Botanical Institute of the Czechoslovak Academy of Sciences in Průhonice near Prague, he became a researcher in lichenology for this institution starting in 1963 – this was a job he was allowed to do at home. His three-room apartment in Brno became his office, herbarium, and home. His address, Tábor 28A, eventually became well known to lichenologists over the world, many of whom who knew him only through correspondence or by sending him specimens to study. In 1967 Vězda earned a Candidate of Sciences degree after defending a dissertation on the family Gyalectaceae. This dissertation launched his international career, and, despite the isolation imposed by the communist regime, he continued corresponding with prominent lichenologists worldwide, some of whom visited him, or sent him collections for analysis. It was in this way that he met Josef Poelt, with whom he developed a long-lasting friendship.

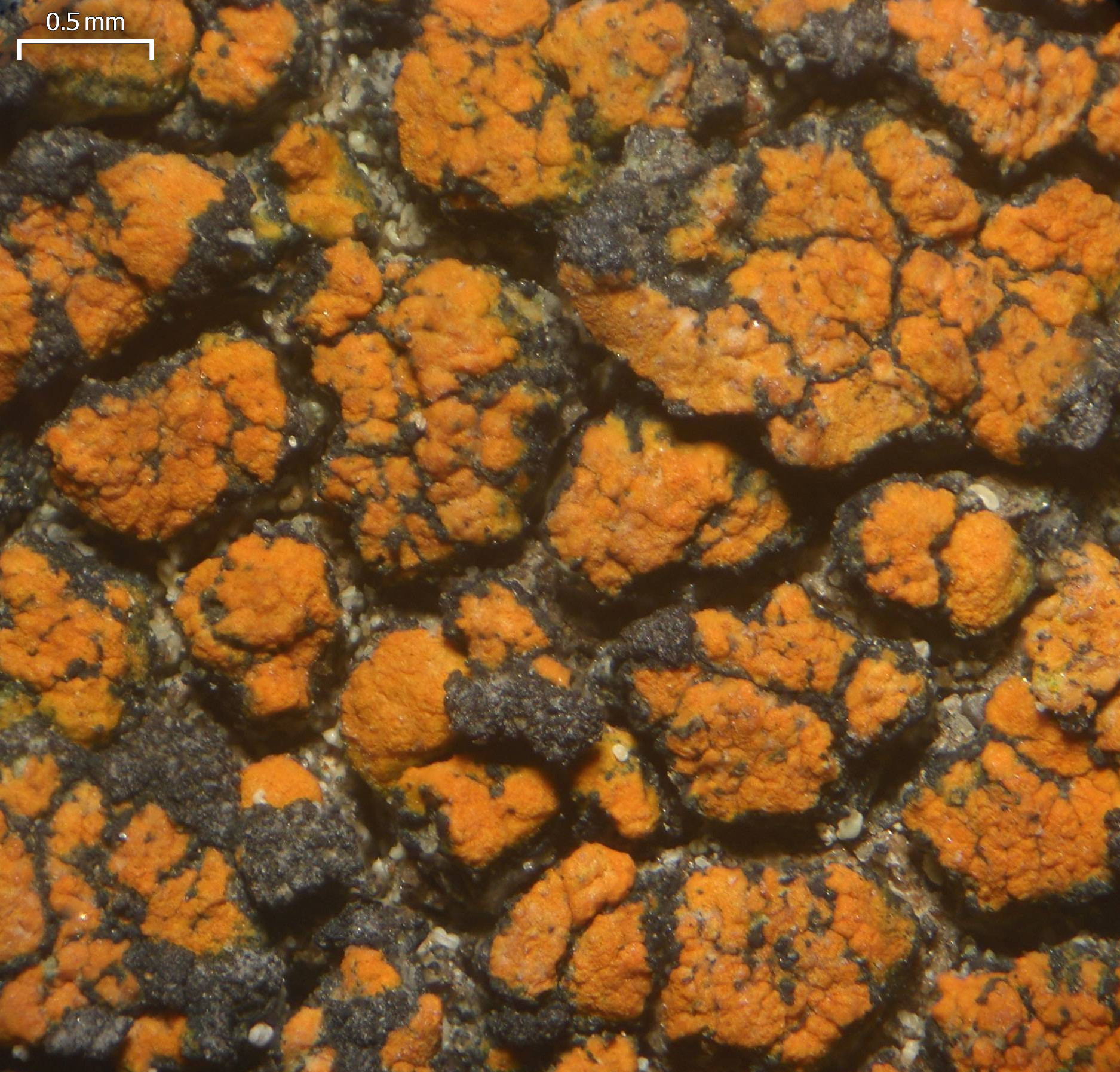
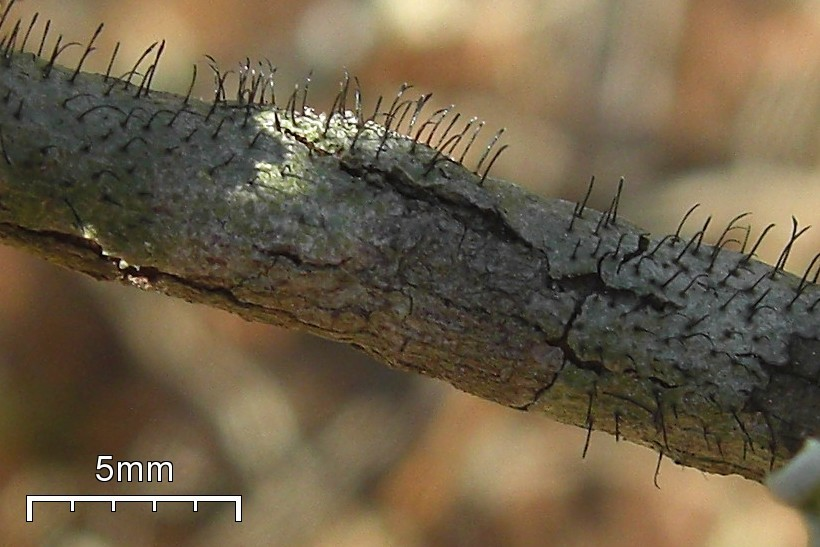
Two of the many lichen species that Vězda has introduced as new to science are Caloplaca adnexa Vězda (1977) (top) and Gyalideopsis buckii Lücking, Sérus. & Vězda (2005) (bottom)

Vězda was a passionate collector of lichens. During the time of the Iron Curtain, his travels had to be limited to Eastern Europe and the Caucasus; even there he could often only collect disguised as a tourist. It was only later, after retirement, that he visited many regions in Western and Southern Europe and overseas areas, including the Canary Islands, Dominica, New Zealand, Malaysia, and Seychelles. Vězda created several extensive works of exsiccata (a collection or series of dried herbarium specimens). His exsiccata collection titled Lichenes Bohemoslovakiae exsiccati (1957–1959) contained many species from his home country, while Lichenes selecti exsiccati became one of the largest exsiccata ever issued, with around 2500 specimens; he was praised by colleagues and herbaria curators worldwide for this collection. His exsiccata series Lichenes Rariores Exsiccati (1992–2003) contained nearly 500 specimens with material gathered by 72 collectors.

Known as one of the best lichen taxonomists, Vězda had a prolific output as a scientist, publishing 376 scientific papers between 1948 and 2008. About 70% of these papers were published solitarily; when he did have co-authors, they were most often Josef Poelt, William W. Malcolm, and Klaus Kalb. He named 478 taxa, including 2 families (Protothelenellaceae Vězda, H.Mayrhofer & Poelt, and Solorinellaceae Vězda & Poelt), 38 genera, and 399 species, and several taxa at various other ranks. He also proposed 282 new combinations. In the year before his death, Vězda published a summary of the new species he and coauthors described between 1958 and 2007. He developed an early interest in the family Gyalectaceae, including the genera Bacidia and Micarea. The first species he described was Gyalecta cernohorskyi in 1958. Vězda has been credited with introducing the lichen term hyphophore in a 1973 publication, referring to a microscopic spore-producing structure found in tropical foliicolous lichens.

Vězda was active as a lichenologist well into his 80s. In addition to his collection of about 10,000 reprints and 500 books about lichens, his personal herbarium amassed more than 300,000 specimens; these collections are now kept at the Institute of Botany of the Czech Academy of Sciences. Antonín Vězda died in Brno on 10 November 2008, at the age of 87.

== Recognition ==
Vězda was one of the first recipients of the prestigious Acharius Medal in 1992, awarded for lifetime contributions to lichenology. A Festschrift was dedicated to him in 1995 in the journal Scripta Lichenologica, on the occasion of his 75th birthday. The same year, he won the Holuby memorial medal from the Slovak Botanical Society. An exsiccate issued in 2010, containing "little, fine, special lichens and lichenicolous fungi", was dedicated to him by Hungarian lichenologist Edit Farkas. He became an honorary member of the British Lichen Society, the Societa Lichenologica Italiana, the Czech Botanical Society, and the Czech Scientific Society for Mycology.

Vězda has been used as an example of someone most closely approaching the ideal "universal lichen taxonomist", which is "characterised by a broad knowledge in lichen taxonomy, prolificacy and efficiency in publishing their studies, usually in sole authorship, and distribution of knowledge via exsiccata rather than teaching or having students". The National Museum in Prague, which holds his extensive collections of exsiccate material, calls him "possibly the best-known Czech lichenologist". Robert Lücking, a former mentee of Vězda, suggested that he may have been "the most eminent lichen taxonomist of the past century".

=== Eponymy ===
Three genera have been named to honour Antonín Vězda: Vezdaea Tscherm.-Woess & Poelt (1976), Zevadia J.C.David & D.Hawksw. (1995), and Vezdamyces Xavier-Leite, M.Cáceres & Lücking (2023). Vězda has also had many species named after him, including: Asterothyrium vezdae Flakus & Lücking (2008); Bacidia vezdae Coppins & P.James (1978); Bacidia vezdana Lücking (1992); Badimia vezdana Lücking, Farkas & V.Wirth (2011); Belonia vezdana Malcolm & Coppins (1997); Buellia vezdana P.Scholz & Knoph (1995); Byssolecania vezdae Kalb & Lücking (2000); Byssoloma vezdanum Sérus. (1978); Chromatochlamys vezdae H.Mayrhofer & Poelt (1985); Cliostomum vezdae Kantvilas & Elix (1995); Dimerella vezdana Lücking (1999); Enterographa vezdae Sparrius (2004); Gyalideopsis vezdae Kalb (1983); Laurera vezdae Makhija & Patw. (1988); Lecidea vezdae V.Wirth (1974); Linhartia vezdana Lücking (1995); Ocellularia vezdana Frisch (2006); Porina vezdae Lücking (1991); Rinodina vezdae H.Mayrhofer (1984); Stigmidium vezdae Matzer (1996); Thelotrema antoninii Purvis & P.James (1995); Topeliopsis vezdae Kalb (2001); Tricharia vezdae W.R.Buck (1980); and Echinoplaca vezdana Lücking & Kalb (2001).

== Selected publications ==
A complete listing of Vězda's scientific publications up to 2006 is given in a series of publications by Černohorský (1980), Pišút (1990) and (2001), and Krahulec and Palice (2006). Some of his major works include:

- Vězda, Antonín (1975). "Foliikole Flechten aus Tanzania (Ost-Afrika)". Folia Geobotanica et Phytotaxonomica. 10 (4): 383–432. doi:10.1007/BF02854975.
- Poelt, Josef; Vězda, Antonín (1977). Bestimmungsschlussel europaischer Flechten (in German). Berlin: J. Cramer. ISBN 978-3768201599.
- Vězda, Antonín (1986). "Neue Gattungen der Familie Lecideaceae s. lat. (Lichenes)". Folia Geobotanica & Phytotaxonomica. 21 (2): 199–219. doi:10.1007/BF02854668. JSTOR 4180678.
- Kalb, K.; Vězda, A. (1988). Neue oder bemerkenswerte Arten der Flechtenfamilie Gomphillaceae in der Neotropis [New or otherwise interesting species of the lichen family Gomphillaceae in the Neotropics]. Bibliotheca Lichenologica (in German). Vol. 29. Lubrecht & Kramer. pp. 1–80. ISBN 978-3443580087.
- Lücking, Robert; Vězda, Antonín (1998). "Taxonomic studies in foliicolous species of the genus Porina (lichenized Ascomycotina: Trichotheliaceae)—II. The Porina epiphylla group". Willdenowia. 28 (1/2): 181–225. doi:10.3372/wi.28.2818. JSTOR 3997034.
- Lücking, Robert; Sérusiaux, Emmanuël; Vězda, Antonín (2005). "Phylogeny and systematics of the lichen family Gomphillaceae (Ostropales) inferred from cladistic analysis of phenotype data". The Lichenologist. 37 (2): 123–170. doi:10.1017/S0024282905014660. hdl:2268/175274.

== See also ==
- Category:Taxa named by Antonín Vězda
