= Foliicolous lichen =

Lichens that grow on plant leaves

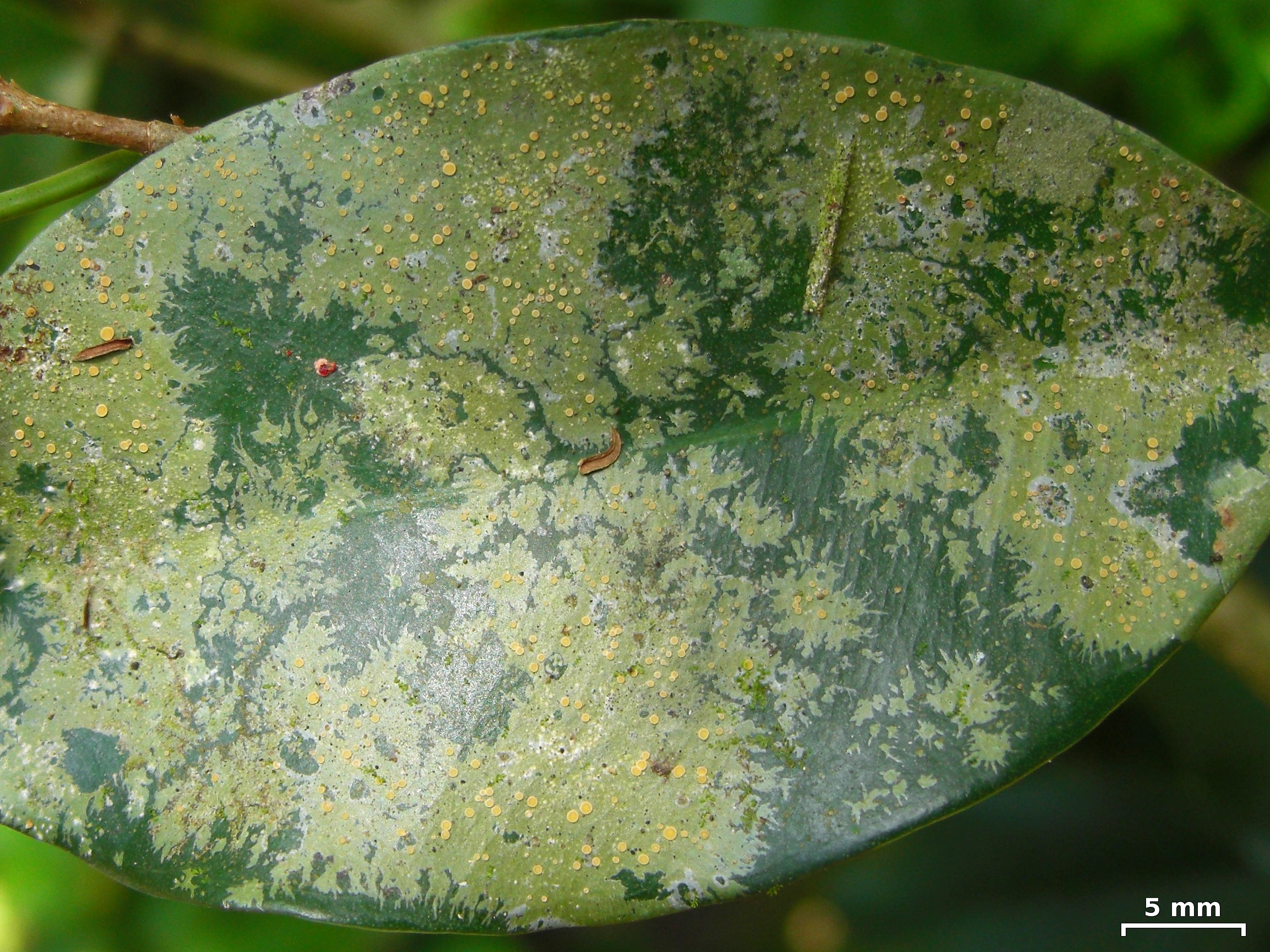
Foliicolous lichens seen in the Peruvian Amazon

A foliicolous lichen is a lichen which grows on the surfaces of living leaves of vascular plants, usually inhabiting the upper surface (epiphyllous) but sometimes also the lower surface (hypophyllous). Foliicolous lichens largely occur in tropical environments and of the over 800 foliicolous lichens accepted (as of 2008) over 600 of these are known from the tropics. Unlike most lichens which are common in humid but cool and temperate climates, these tropical lichens are more suited to the higher temperatures and lower light levels present beneath the rainforest canopy, where they are involved in the nutrient cycle and water retention. Chlorophyta are common photosynthetic partner phycobionts of epiphyllous lichens.

== See also ==
- Foliicolous
- Epiphytic fungus
- Parasitic plant
- Epilith
