= Phaeodothiopsis =

Scientific classification
- Kingdom: Fungi
- Division: Ascomycota
- Class: incertae sedis
- Order: incertae sedis
- Family: incertae sedis
- Genus: Phaeodothiopsis; Theiss. & Syd.

Type species
- Phaeodothiopsis zollingeri (Mont. & Berk.) Theiss. & Syd.

Genus of fungi

Phaeodothiopsis is a genus of fungi in the Ascomycota phylum. The relationship of this taxon to other taxa within the phylum is unknown (incertae sedis), and it has not yet been placed with certainty into any class, order, or family.

== See also ==
- List of Ascomycota genera incertae sedis
