= Cystodium =

Cystodium may refer to:

- Cystodium (plant), a genus of ferns
- Cystodium (fungus), a genus of fungi
