= Hapsidascus =

Scientific classification
- Kingdom: Fungi
- Division: Ascomycota
- Class: incertae sedis
- Order: incertae sedis
- Family: incertae sedis
- Genus: Hapsidascus; Kohlm. & Volkm.-Kohlm. (1991)

Type species
- Hapsidascus hadrus Kohlm. & Volkm.-Kohlm. (1991)

Species
- H. hadrus H. junci

Genus of fungi

Hapsidascus is a fungal genus in the division Ascomycota. The relationship of this taxon to other taxa within the phylum is unknown (incertae sedis), and it has not yet been placed with certainty into any class, order, or family.

== See also ==
- List of Ascomycota genera incertae sedis
