= Hirudinaria =

Hirudinaria is the scientific name of two genera of organisms and may refer to:

- Hirudinaria (annelid), a genus of leeches in the family Cylicobdellidae
- Hirudinaria (fungus), a genus of fungi
