= Marisolaris =

Scientific classification
- Kingdom: Fungi
- Division: Ascomycota
- Class: incertae sedis
- Order: incertae sedis
- Family: incertae sedis
- Genus: Marisolaris; Jørgen Koch & E.B.G. Jones

Type species
- Marisolaris ansata Jørg. Koch & E.B.G. Jones

Genus of fungi

Marisolaris is a genus of fungi in the Ascomycota phylum. The relationship of this taxon to other taxa within the phylum is unknown (incertae sedis), and it has not yet been placed with certainty into any class, order, or family. This is a monotypic genus, containing the single species Marisolaris ansata.

== See also ==
- List of Ascomycota genera incertae sedis
