= Ascosorus =

Scientific classification
- Kingdom: Fungi
- Division: Ascomycota
- Class: incertae sedis
- Order: incertae sedis
- Family: incertae sedis
- Genus: Ascosorus; Henn. & Ruhland

Type species
- Ascosorus floridanus (Ellis & G. Martin) Henn. & Ruhland

Genus of fungi

Ascosorus is a genus of fungi in the Ascomycota phylum. The relationship of this taxon to other taxa within the phylum is unknown (incertae sedis), and it has not yet been placed with certainty into any class, order, or family. This is a monotypic genus, containing the single species Ascosorus floridanus.

== See also ==
- List of Ascomycota genera incertae sedis
