= Moorella =

Moorella may refer to:

- Moorella (bacterium), a bacterial genus belonging to the phylum Bacillota
- Moorella (fungus), a genus of fungi within the phylum Ascomycota
- Moorella (wasp), a wasp genus in the family Encyrtidae
