= Trichoplacia =

Scientific classification
- Kingdom: Fungi
- Division: Ascomycota
- Class: incertae sedis
- Order: incertae sedis
- Family: incertae sedis
- Genus: Trichoplacia A.Massal. (1853)
- Species: T. microscopica

Binomial name
- Trichoplacia microscopica (Mont.) A.Massal. (1853)

Genus of fungi

Trichoplacia is a fungal genus in the division Ascomycota. The relationship of this taxon to other taxa within the phylum is unknown (incertae sedis), and it has not yet been placed with certainty into any class, order, or family. This is a monotypic genus, containing the single species Trichoplacia microscopica.

== See also ==
- List of Ascomycota genera incertae sedis
