= Clypeolum =

Clypeolum is the scientific name of two genera of organisms and may refer to:

- Clypeolum (fungus), a genus of fungi
- Clypeolum (gastropod), a genus of snails in the family Neritidae
