= Roeslerina =

Scientific classification
- Kingdom: Fungi
- Division: Ascomycota
- Class: incertae sedis
- Order: incertae sedis
- Family: incertae sedis
- Genus: Roeslerina; Redhead

Type species
- Roeslerina radicella Redhead

Genus of fungi

Roeslerina is a genus of fungi in the Ascomycota phylum. The relationship of this taxon to other taxa within the phylum is unknown (incertae sedis), and it has not yet been placed with certainty into any class, order, or family.

The genus was circumscribed by Scott Alan Redhead in Canad. J. Bot. vol.62 on page 2514 in 1984 (published in 1985).

The genus name of Roeslerina was named as a diminutive form of Roesleria which in turn was named in honour of Leonard Roesler (1839–1910), who was a German-Austrian chemist and oenologist, he was Professor at the Technical University of Karlsruhe in 1867.

== Species ==
As accepted by Species Fungorum;

- Roeslerina media Y.J. Yao & Spooner (1999)
- Roeslerina microspora Redhead (1985)
- Roeslerina radicella Redhead (1985)

== See also ==
- List of Ascomycota genera incertae sedis
