= Harmandiana =

Scientific classification
- Kingdom: Fungi
- Division: Ascomycota
- Class: incertae sedis
- Order: incertae sedis
- Family: incertae sedis
- Genus: Harmandiana de Lesd. (1914)

Type species
- Harmandiana vouauxii B.de Lesd. (1914)

Genus of fungi

Harmandiana is a fungal genus in the division Ascomycota. The relationship of this taxon to other taxa within the phylum is unknown (incertae sedis), and it has not yet been placed with certainty into any class, order, or family. This is a monotypic genus, containing the single species Harmandiana vouauxii.

The genus name of Harmandiana is in honour of Julien Herbert Auguste Jules Harmand (1844-1915), who was a French clergyman and botanist (Mycology and Lichenology).

The genus was circumscribed by Maurice Léopold Joseph Bouly de Lesdain in Rech. Lich. Dunkerque Suppl. on pages 57–149 in 1914.

== See also ==
- List of Ascomycota genera incertae sedis
