= Biflua =

Scientific classification
- Kingdom: Fungi
- Division: Ascomycota
- Class: incertae sedis
- Order: incertae sedis
- Family: incertae sedis
- Genus: Biflua; Jørgen Koch & E.B.G. Jones

Type species
- Biflua physasca Jørg. Koch & E.B.G. Jones

Genus of fungi

Biflua is a genus of fungi in the Ascomycota phylum. The relationship of this taxon to other taxa within the phylum is unknown (incertae sedis), and it has not yet been placed with certainty into any class, order, or family. This is a monotypic genus, containing the single species Biflua physasca.

== See also ==
- List of Ascomycota genera incertae sedis
