= Antimanoa =

Scientific classification
- Kingdom: Fungi
- Division: Ascomycota
- Class: incertae sedis
- Order: incertae sedis
- Family: incertae sedis
- Genus: Antimanoa; Syd. (1930)
- Species: A. grisleae

Binomial name
- Antimanoa grisleae Syd. (1930)

Genus of fungi

Antimanoa is a fungal genus in the division Ascomycota. The relationship of this taxon to other taxa within the division is unknown (incertae sedis), and it has not yet been placed with certainty into any class, order, or family. This is a monotypic genus, containing the single species Antimanoa grisleae, originally collected from Venezuela. The genus and species were described as new to science in 1930 by German mycologist Hans Sydow.

== See also ==
- List of Ascomycota genera incertae sedis
