= Carnia (fungus) =

Scientific classification
- Kingdom: Fungi
- Division: Ascomycota
- Class: incertae sedis
- Order: incertae sedis
- Family: incertae sedis
- Genus: Carnia; Bat. (1960)

Type species
- Carnia tabebuiae Bat. & Peres (1960)

Genus of fungi

Carnia is a genus of fungi in the division Ascomycota. The relationship of this taxon to other taxa within the phylum is unknown (incertae sedis), and it has not yet been placed with certainty into any class, order, or family. A monotypic genus, Carnia contains the single species Carnia tabebuiae, described as new to science in 1960.

== See also ==
- List of Ascomycota genera incertae sedis
