= Allophoron =

Scientific classification
- Kingdom: Fungi
- Division: Ascomycota
- Class: incertae sedis
- Order: incertae sedis
- Family: incertae sedis
- Genus: Allophoron; Nádv. (1942)
- Species: A. farinosum

Binomial name
- Allophoron farinosum Nádv. (1942)

Single-species fungal genus

Allophoron is a fungal genus in the division Ascomycota. The relationship of this taxon to other taxa within the division is unknown (incertae sedis), and it has not yet been placed with certainty into any class, order, or family. This is a monotypic genus, containing the single lichen species Allophoron farinosum, found in Colombia. The genus and species were described as new in 1942 by Czech lichenologist Josef Nádvorník. Allophoron has been reported from tropical regions, but A. farinosum is known only from the type collection made in a Quercus humboldtii forest near Bogotá, and has not been rediscovered despite subsequent studies of that lichen biota; its habitat has also declined because of logging and urban expansion.

== See also ==
- List of Ascomycota genera incertae sedis
