= Ludwigomyces =

Scientific classification
- Kingdom: Fungi
- Division: Ascomycota
- Class: incertae sedis
- Order: incertae sedis
- Family: incertae sedis
- Genus: Ludwigomyces; Kirschst.

Type species
- Ludwigomyces parasiticus

Genus of fungi

Ludwigomyces is a genus of fungi in the Ascomycota phylum. The relationship of this taxon to other taxa within the phylum is unknown (incertae sedis), and it has not yet been placed with certainty into any class, order, or family. This is a monotypic genus, containing the single species Ludwigomyces parasiticus.

The genus name of Ludwigomyces is in honour of Alfred Ludwig (1879–1964), who was a German botanist (Mycology), teacher (Biology, Chemistry and Physics) in Forbach (city in Lothringen).

The genus was circumscribed by Wilhelm Kirschstein in Ann. Mycol. vol.37 on page 139 in 1939.

== See also ==
- List of Ascomycota genera incertae sedis
