= Cyanopyrenia =

Scientific classification
- Kingdom: Fungi
- Division: Ascomycota
- Class: incertae sedis
- Order: incertae sedis
- Family: incertae sedis
- Genus: Cyanopyrenia; Harada

Type species
- Cyanopyrenia japonica H. Harada

Genus of fungi

Cyanopyrenia is a genus of fungi in the Ascomycota phylum. The relationship of this taxon to other taxa within the phylum is unknown (incertae sedis), and it has not yet been placed with certainty into any class, order, or family. This is a monotypic genus, containing the single species Cyanopyrenia japonica.

== See also ==
- List of Ascomycota genera incertae sedis
