= Hymenobia =

Scientific classification
- Domain: Eukaryota
- Kingdom: Fungi
- Division: Ascomycota
- Class: incertae sedis
- Genus: Hymenobia; Nyl. (1854)
- Species: H. insidiosa

Binomial name
- Hymenobia insidiosa Nyl. (1854)

Monotypic genus of fungi

Hymenobia is a fungal genus in the division Ascomycota. The relationship of this taxon to other taxa within the phylum is unknown (incertae sedis), and it has not yet been placed with certainty into any class, order, or family. This is a monotypic genus, containing the single species Hymenobia aporea.

== See also ==
- List of Ascomycota genera incertae sedis
