= Heuflera =

Scientific classification
- Kingdom: Fungi
- Division: Ascomycota
- Class: incertae sedis
- Order: incertae sedis
- Family: incertae sedis
- Genus: Heuflera; Bail (1860)

Type species
- Heuflera betulae Bail (1860)

Genus of fungi

Heuflera is a fungal genus in the division Ascomycota.

The genus name of Heuflera is in honour of Ludwig Samuel Joseph David Alexander von Heufler (1817–1885), who was an Austrian baron and cryptogamist.

The genus was circumscribed by Carl Adolf Emmo Theodor Bail in Österr. Bot. Z. vol.10 on page 110 in 1860.

The relationship of this taxon to other taxa within the phylum is unknown (incertae sedis), and it has not yet been placed with certainty into any class, order, or family. This is a monotypic genus, containing the single species Heuflera betulae.

== See also ==
- List of Ascomycota genera incertae sedis
