= Gyrophthorus =

Scientific classification
- Kingdom: Fungi
- Division: Ascomycota
- Class: incertae sedis
- Order: incertae sedis
- Family: incertae sedis
- Genus: Gyrophthorus; Hafellner & Sancho (1990)

Type species
- Gyrophthorus perforans Hafellner & Sancho (1990)

Species
- G. crustulosae G. gracilis G. perforans

Genus of fungi

Gyrophthorus is a genus of lichenicolous (lichen-dwelling) fungi in the phylum Ascomycota. The relationship of this taxon to other taxa within the phylum is unknown (incertae sedis), and it has not yet been placed with certainty into any class, order, or family. The genus was circumscribed in 1990 by Josef Hafellner and Leopoldo Sancho, with Gyrophthorus perforans assigned as the type species.

== Species ==
- Gyrophthorus crustulosae (Creveld) Hafellner & Sancho (1990)
- Gyrophthorus gracilis Nik.Hoffm. & Hafellner (2000)
- Gyrophthorus perforans Hafellner & Sancho (1990)

All three Gyrophthorus species are parasitic on lichens from genus Umbilicaria.

== See also ==
- List of Ascomycota genera incertae sedis
