= Milospium =

Scientific classification
- Kingdom: Fungi
- Division: Ascomycota
- Subdivision: Pezizomycotina
- Class: incertae sedis
- Order: incertae sedis
- Family: incertae sedis
- Genus: Milospium; D.Hawksw. (1975)

Type species
- Milospium graphideorum

Species
- M. deslooveri M. graphideorum M. lacoizquetae M. planorbis

Genus of lichen-forming fungi

Milospium is a fungal genus of uncertain placement in the Ascomycota. It comprises three species of lichenicolous (lichen-dwelling) fungi, and one lichen-forming hyphomycete.

== Taxonomy ==
The genus was circumscribed by David Leslie Hawksworth in 1975, with M. graphideorum as the type, and only species. The genus name is an anagram of Spilomium, a genus name that was considered for use but could not be used for nomenclatural reasons.

== Description ==
Milospium was originally described as a genus of fungi that grows parasitically on lichens (lichenicolous). The fungus forms spreading (effuse) colonies that appear dark brown to black to the naked eye. Its fungal threads (mycelium) grow either on the surface of the host lichen or slightly penetrate into it. The genus lacks several structures common to other fungi, including a dense fungal mass (stroma), bristle-like structures (setae), and specialiszed feeding structures (hyphopodia).

The spore-producing structures (conidiophores) are relatively simple, ranging from very small to moderately sized, and typically grow as individual stalks rather than in clusters. These conidiophores are usually unbranched, though rare branching may occur, and appear curved or winding. They can range in colour from transparent (hyaline) to light brown.

The cells that actually produce the spores (conidiogenous cells) are integrated into the conidiophores at their tips. These cells produce only one spore at a time (monoblastic) and are determinate, meaning they stop growing after producing spores. Like the conidiophores, they can be transparent to pale brown and range from cylindrical to ellipsoid in shape.

The spores (conidia) are produced individually and are dry rather than slimy. They develop at both the tips and sides of the conidiogenous cells (acropleurogenous). The spores have a distinctive shape: while roughly spherical to ellipsoid overall, they feature rounded lobes and folds. They have thick, smooth walls and range in colour from olive-brown to dark brown.

== Species ==
- Milospium deslooveri Diederich & Sérus. (1999)
- Milospium graphideorum (Nyl.) D.Hawksw. (1975) – host: Dirina massiliensis
- Milospium lacoizquetae Etayo & Diederich (1996) – host: Cladonia
- Milospium planorbis Aptroot & Sipman (2001)

Milospium planorbis, known only from the type locality in Hong Kong, is, according to the authors, "certainly a lichenized hyphomycete because of the distribution of the conidiomata over the thallus". However, in 2015 Hawksworth and colleagues noted "Several other lichenicolous fungi have been placed in Milospilum by subsequent authors, but most of these have spores with septae and differently thickened walls and are unlikely to be revealed as congeneric by molecular data".

== See also ==
- List of Ascomycota genera incertae sedis
