= Igneocumulus =

Scientific classification
- Kingdom: Fungi
- Division: Ascomycota
- Class: incertae sedis
- Order: incertae sedis
- Family: incertae sedis
- Genus: Igneocumulus; A.W.Ramaley (2003)

Type species
- Igneocumulus yuccae A.W.Ramaley (2003)

Genus of fungi

Igneocumulus is a fungal genus in the division Ascomycota. The relationship of this taxon to other taxa within the phylum is unknown (incertae sedis), and it has not yet been placed with certainty into any class, order, or family. This is a monotypic genus, containing the single species Igneocumulus yuccae.

== See also ==
- List of Ascomycota genera incertae sedis
