= Frigidispora =

Scientific classification
- Kingdom: Fungi
- Division: Ascomycota
- Class: incertae sedis
- Order: incertae sedis
- Family: incertae sedis
- Genus: Frigidispora; K.D.Hyde & Goh (1999)

Type species
- Frigidispora colnensis K.D.Hyde & Goh (1999)

Genus of fungi

Frigidispora is a fungal genus in the Ascomycota division. The relationship of this taxon to other taxa within the phylum is unknown (incertae sedis), and it has not yet been placed with certainty into any class, order, or family. The genus is monotypic, containing the single aquatic anamorphic species Frigidispora colnensis, described in 1999 from the United Kingdom.

== See also ==
- List of Ascomycota genera incertae sedis
