= Telioclipeum =

Scientific classification
- Kingdom: Fungi
- Division: Ascomycota
- Class: incertae sedis
- Order: incertae sedis
- Family: incertae sedis
- Genus: Telioclipeum; Viégas (1962)

Type species
- Telioclipeum lavrense Viégas (1962)

Genus of fungi

Telioclipeum is a fungal genus in the division Ascomycota. The relationship of this taxon to other taxa within the phylum is unknown (incertae sedis), and it has not yet been placed with certainty into any class, order, or family. This is a monotypic genus, containing the single species Telioclipeum lavrense.

== See also ==
- List of Ascomycota genera incertae sedis
