= Apiotypa =

Scientific classification
- Kingdom: Fungi
- Division: Ascomycota
- Class: incertae sedis
- Genus: Apiotypa; Petr.

Type species
- Apiotypa philippinensis Petr.

Genus of fungi

Apiotypa is a genus of fungi in the Ascomycota phylum. The relationship of this taxon to other taxa within the phylum is unknown (incertae sedis), and it has not yet been placed with certainty into any class, order, or family. This is a monotypic genus, containing the single species Apiotypa philippinensis.

== See also ==
- List of Ascomycota genera incertae sedis
