= Dryinosphaera =

Scientific classification
- Kingdom: Fungi
- Division: Ascomycota
- Class: incertae sedis
- Order: incertae sedis
- Family: incertae sedis
- Genus: Dryinosphaera; Dumort. Eiona Kohlm.

Genus of fungi

Dryinosphaera is a genus of fungi in the Ascomycota phylum. The relationship of this taxon to other taxa within the phylum is unknown (incertae sedis), and it has not yet been placed with certainty into any class, order, or family.

== See also ==
- List of Ascomycota genera incertae sedis
