= Lichenopeziza =

Scientific classification
- Domain: Eukaryota
- Kingdom: Fungi
- Division: Ascomycota
- Class: incertae sedis
- Order: incertae sedis
- Family: incertae sedis
- Genus: Lichenopeziza; Zukal, 1884

Type species
- Lichenopeziza bryophile Zukal, 1884

Genus of fungi

Lichenopeziza is a genus of fungi in the Ascomycota phylum. The relationship of this taxon to other taxa within the phylum is unknown (incertae sedis), and it has not yet been placed with certainty into any class, order, or family. This is a monotypic genus, containing the single species Lichenopeziza bryophile.

== See also ==
- List of Ascomycota genera incertae sedis
