= Cerastoma =

Scientific classification
- Kingdom: Fungi
- Division: Ascomycota
- Class: Sordariomycetes
- Order: Coronophorales
- Family: Ceratostomataceae
- Genus: Cerastoma; Quél.

Genus of fungi

Cerastoma is a genus of fungi in the family Ceratostomataceae.

== See also ==
- List of Ascomycota genera incertae sedis
