= Leptascospora =

Scientific classification
- Kingdom: Fungi
- Division: Ascomycota
- Class: Sordariomycetes
- Order: Meliolales
- Family: Meliolaceae
- Genus: Leptascospora; Speg.

Type species
- Leptascospora uredinis (Racib.) Speg.

Genus of fungi

Leptascospora is a genus of fungi within the Meliolaceae family. This is a monotypic genus, containing the single species Leptascospora uredinis.
