= Dactylosporium =

Scientific classification
- Kingdom: Fungi
- Division: Ascomycota
- Subdivision: Pezizomycotina
- Genus: Dactylosporium; Harz, 1871

Genus of fungi

Dactylosporium is a genus of fungi belonging to the subdivision Pezizomycotina, unknown family.

Species:

- Dactylosporium brevipes
- Dactylosporium coronatum
- Dactylosporium hibisci
- Dactylosporium leptosporum
- Dactylosporium macropus
- Dactylosporium occultum
