= Asterophoma =

Scientific classification
- Kingdom: Fungi
- Division: Ascomycota
- Class: Eurotiomycetes
- Order: Mycocaliciales
- Family: Mycocaliciaceae
- Genus: Asterophoma; D. Hawksw.

Type species
- Asterophoma mazaediicola D. Hawksw.

Genus of fungi

Asterophoma is a genus of fungi in the family Mycocaliciaceae. This is a monotypic genus, containing the single species Asterophoma mazaediicola.
