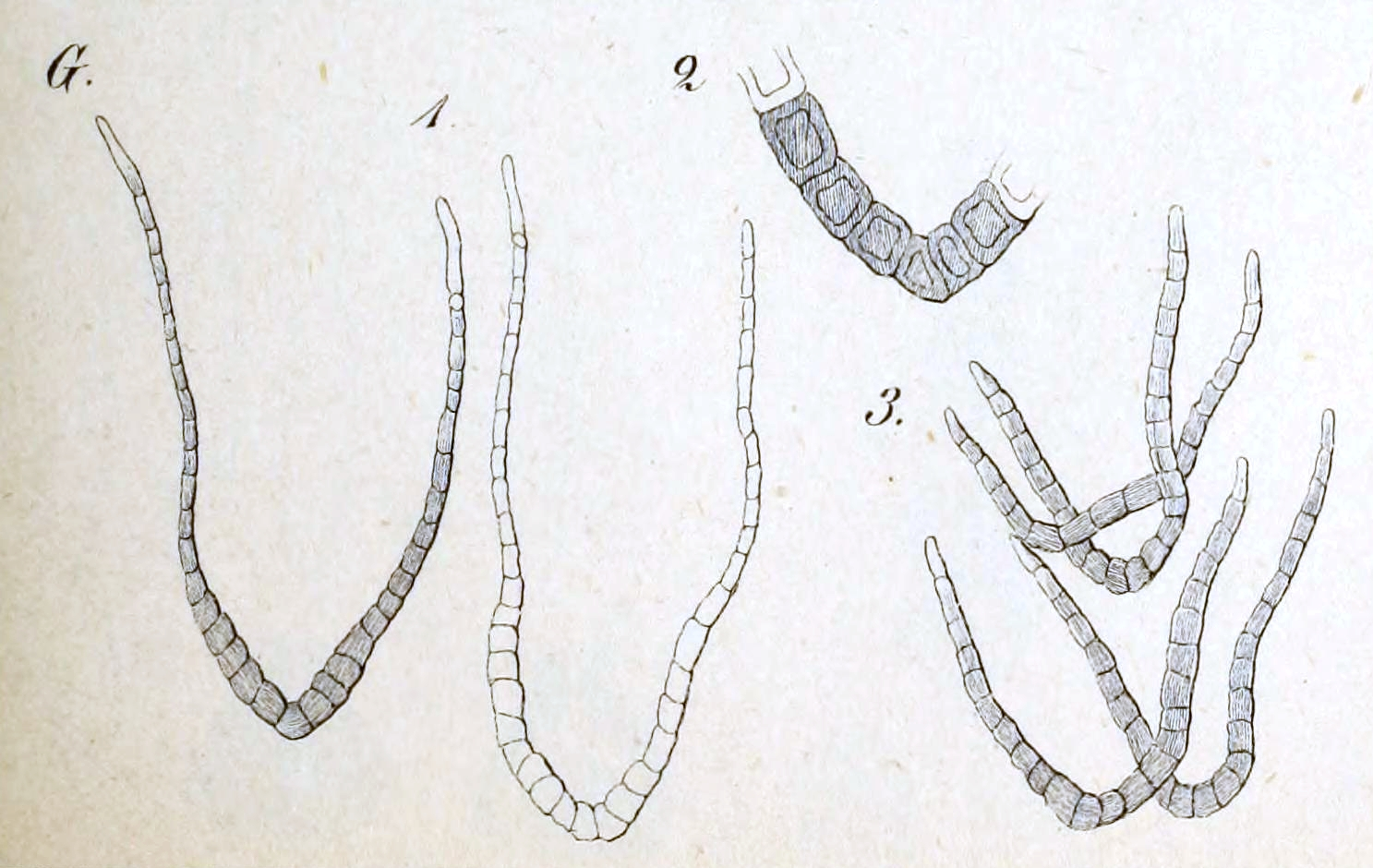
- Hirudinaria mespili

Scientific classification
- Kingdom: Fungi
- Division: Ascomycota
- Clade: Saccharomyceta
- Subdivision: Pezizomycotina
- Genus: Hirudinaria; Cesati, 1856

Synonyms
- Hippocrepidium Saccardo, 1874

= Hirudinaria (fungus) =

Genus of fungi

Hirudinaria is an accepted genus of fungi in the phylum Ascomycota (order and family incertae sedis). Species are recorded from southern Europe.

== Species ==
The Global Biodiversity Information Facility lists:

1. Hirudinaria arundinariae Hara
2. Hirudinaria macrospora Ces.
3. Hirudinaria mespili Ces.

== See also ==
- List of Ascomycota genera incertae sedis
- Hirudinaria: a genus of leeches
