= Moorella (fungus) =

Scientific classification
- Kingdom: Fungi
- Division: Ascomycota
- Class: incertae sedis
- Order: incertae sedis
- Family: incertae sedis
- Genus: Moorella; P.Rag.Rao & D.Rao

Genus of fungi

Moorella is a genus of saprophytic fungi within the Ascomycota (it has been originally classified within the former taxa Dematiaceae, Helicosporae). It is named Moorella in honour of mycologist Royall T. Moore, because of his contributions to Helicosporae.

Moorella speciosa is the type species of this genus, an anamorph fungus that has been collected growing on dead bark in Nizamabad, India.

GBIF also lists;

- Moorella heterospora P.N.Singh & S.K.Singh
- Moorella monocephala Matsush.
