= Dryosphaera =

Scientific classification
- Kingdom: Fungi
- Division: Ascomycota
- Class: Sordariomycetes
- Informal group: Sordariomycetes incertae sedis
- Genus: Dryosphaera; Jørg.Koch & E.B.G.Jones (1989)

Type species
- Dryosphaera navigans Jørg.Koch & E.B.G.Jones (1989)

Species
- D. navigans D. tenuis D. tropicalis

Genus of fungi

Dryosphaera is a genus of fungi in the class Sordariomycetes. The relationship of this taxon to other taxa within the class is unknown (incertae sedis).
