= List of Ascomycota genera incertae sedis =

This is a list of genera in the fungal division Ascomycota with uncertain taxonomic placement (incertae sedis). These genera have not yet been assigned to any class, order, or family. The compendium is based on the 2021 work "Outline of Fungi and fungus-like taxa", which lists 1148 Ascomycota genera incertae sedis.

== A ==
- Abropelta B.Sutton – 1 sp.
- Acarellina Bat. & H.Maia – 1 sp.
- Acaroconium Kocourk. & D.Hawksw. – 1 sp.
- Acarocybe Syd. – 3 spp.
- Acarocybella M.B.Ellis – 1 sp.
- Acarocybellina Subram. – 1 sp.
- Acarocybiopsis J.Mena, A.Hern.-Gut. & Mercado – 1 sp.
- Acaropeltis Petr. – 1 sp.
- Achoropeltis Syd. – 1 sp.
- Acleistia Bayl.Ell. – 1 sp.
- Acontium Morgan – 4 spp.
- Acrodictyella W.A.Baker & Partr. – 1 sp.
- Acrodictyopsis P.M.Kirk – 1 sp.
- Acrodontiella U.Braun & Scheuer – 1 sp.
- Acrophragmis Kiffer & Reisinger – 4 spp.
- Acrospeira Berk. & Broome – 1 sp.
- Acrostaurus Deighton & Piroz. – 1 sp.
- Actinocladium Ehrenb. – 6 spp.
- Actinotexis Arx – 1 sp.
- Actinothecium Ces. – 5 spp.
- Actinothyrium Kunze – 10 spp.
- Acumispora Matsush. – 5 spp.
- Agaricodochium X.J.Liu – 1 sp.
- Agarwalomyces R.K.Verma & Kamal – 1 sp.
- Agrabeeja Subram. – 1 sp.
- Agyriella Sacc. – 2 spp.
- Agyriellopsis Höhn. – 3 spp.
- Ahmadia Syd. – 1 sp.
- Ajrekarella Kamat & Kalani – 1 sp.
- Alatosessilispora K.Ando & Tubaki – 1 sp.
- Alciphila Harmaja – 1 sp.
- Algonquinia R.F.Castañeda & W.B.Kendr. – 1 sp.
- Allophoron Nádv. – 1 sp.
- Allothyriella Bat., Cif. & Nascim. – 3 spp.
- Allothyrina Bat. & J.L.Bezerra – 1 sp.
- Allothyriopsis Bat., Cif. & H.Maia – 1 sp.
- Alpakesa Subram. & K.Ramakr. – 4 spp.
- Alpakesiopsis Abbas, B.Sutton, Ghaffar & A.Abbas – 1 sp.
- Alveariospora Meir.Silva, R.F.Castañeda, O.L.Pereira & R.W.Barreto – 1 sp.
- Alveophoma Alcalde – 1 sp.
- Alysidiopsis B.Sutton – 5 spp.
- Amallospora Penz. – 1 sp.
- Amblyosporium Fresen. – 4 spp.
- Ameroconium U.Braun & Zhurb. – 1 sp.
- Amerodiscosiella M.L.Farr – 1 sp.
- Amerodiscosiellina Bat. & Cavalc. – 1 sp.
- Amerosporiopsis Petr. – 2 spp.
- Amerosympodula Matsush. – 1 sp.
- Amoenodochium Peláez & R.F.Castañeda – 1 sp.
- Amoenomyces R.F.Castañeda, Saikawa & Hennebert – 1 sp.
- Amphichaetella Höhn. – 1 sp.
- Amphophialis R.F.Castañeda, W.B.Kendr. & Guarro – 1 sp.
- Amphoropycnium Bat. – 1 sp.
- Ampullicephala R.F.Castañeda, Minter & M.Stadler – 1 sp.
- Ampulliferina B.Sutton – 2 spp.
- Amylogalla Suija, Motiej. & Kantvilas – 1 sp.
- Anabahusakala Carmo, J.S.Monteiro, Gusmão & R.F.Castañeda – 1 sp.
- Anacraspedodidymum C.R.Silva, R.F.Castañeda & Gusmão – 2 spp.
- Anaexserticlava Santa Izabel, R.F.Castañeda & Gusmão – 1 sp.
- Anaphysmene Bubák – 2 spp.
- Anarhyma M.H.Pei & Z.W.Yuan – 1 sp.
- Anaselenosporella Heredia, R.F.Castañeda & R.M.Arias – 2 spp.
- Anaseptoidium R.F.Castañeda, Heredia & R.M.Arias – 1 sp.
- Anasporidesmiella K.Zhang, R.F.Castañeda, Heredia & Jian Ma – 2 spp.*
- Anaverticicladus P.O.Costa, Malosso & R.F.Castañeda – 1 sp.
- Ancoraspora Mig.Rodr. – 1 sp.
- Ancorasporella J.Mena, Mercado & Heredia – 1 sp.
- Angiopomopsis Höhn. – 1 sp.
- Angulimaya Subram. & Lodha – 1 sp.
- Angulospora Sv.Nilsson – 1 sp.
- Annellodentimyces Matsush. – 1 sp.
- Annellodochium Deighton – 1 sp.
- Annellophorella Subram. – 5 spp.
- Annellospermosporella P.R.Johnst. – 1 sp.
- Antennatula Fr. ex F.Strauss – 10 spp.
- Anthracoderma Speg. – 3 spp.
- Antimanoa Syd. – 1 sp.
- Antromyces Fresen. – 4 spp.
- Anulohypha Cif. – 1 sp.
- Anungitopsis R.F.Castañeda & W.B.Kendr. – 7 spp.
- Aoria Cif. – 1 sp.
- Aphanofalx B.Sutton – 2 spp.
- Apiocarpella Syd. & P.Syd. – 8 spp.
- Apiotypa Petr. – 1 sp.
- Apogloeum Petr. – 1 sp.
- Apomelasmia Grove – 8 spp.
- Aporellula B.Sutton – 2 spp.
- Aposporella Thaxt. – 1 sp.
- Apostrasseria Nag Raj – 2 spp.
- Arachnophora Hennebert – 11 sp.
- Arachnospora R.F.Castañeda, Minter & Camino – 1 sp.
- Arborillus Munt.-Cvetk. & Gómez-Bolea – 1 sp.
- Arborispora K.Ando – 4 spp.
- Arcuadendron Sigler & J.W.Carmich. – 2 spp.
- Ardhachandra Subram. & Sudha – 3 spp.
- Argentinomyces Peña & Arambarri – 1 sp.
- Argopericonia B.Sutton & Pascoe – 2 spp.
- Aristastoma Tehon – 1 sp.
- Arthopyreniomyces Cif. & Tomas. – 1 sp.
- Arthrobotryum Ces. – 5 spp.
- Arthromoniliphora S.S.Silva, Gusmão & R.F.Castañeda – 1 sp.
- Arthrosporium Sacc. – 2 spp.
- Arthrowallemia R.F.Castañeda, Dania García & Guarro – 2 spp.
- Articulophora C.J.K.Wang & B.Sutton – 1 sp.
- Artocarpomyces Subram. – 1 sp.*
- Ascochytopsis Henn. – 5 spp.
- Ascochytulina Petr. – 3 spp.
- Ascocorticiellum (Hauerslev) Jülich & B.de Vries (1982) – 1 sp.
- Ascofascicula Matsush. – 6 spp.
- Ascomauritiana V.M.Ranghoo & K.D.Hyde – 1 sp.
- Ascosubramania Rajendran – 1 sp.
- Ascoxyta Lib. – 1 sp.
- Ashtaangam Subram. – 1 sp.
- Aspilaima Bat. & H.Maia – 1 sp.
- Astelechia Cif. – 2 spp.
- Asterinothyriella Bat. & Cif. – 3 spp.
- Asterinothyrium Bat., Cif. & H.Maia – 1 sp.
- Asteroconium Syd. & P.Syd. – 2 spp.
- Asteromyces F.Moreau & V.Moreau – 1 sp.
- Asterophoma D.Hawksw. – 1 sp.
- Asteroscutula Petr. – 1 sp.
- Asterostomopora Bat. & H.Maia – 1 sp.
- Asterostomopsis Bat., Cif. & H.Maia – 1 sp.
- Asterostomula Theiss. – 4 spp.
- Asterostomulina Bat., J.L.Bezerra & H.Maia – 1 sp.
- Astomella Thirum. – 1 sp.
- Astronatelia Bat. & H.Maia – 1 sp.
- Atractilina Dearn. & Barthol. – 2 spp.
- Atractobolus Tode – 1 sp.
- Atrosetaphiale Matsush. – 1 sp.
- Atrosynnema J.W.Xia, X.G.Zhang & Z.Li – 1 sp.
- Aurosphaeria Sun J.Lee, Strobel, Eisenman, Geary, P.N.Vargas & S.A.Strobel – 1 sp.
- Avesicladiella W.P.Wu, B.Sutton & Gange – 2 spp.
- Avettaea Petr. & Syd. – 3 spp.

Top of page

== B ==
- Bacillopeltis Bat. – 1 sp.
- Bactridium Kunze – 15 spp.
- Bactrodesmiella M.B.Ellis – 2 spp.
- Baculospora Zukal – 1 sp.
- Badarisama Kunwar, J.B.Manandhar & J.B.Sinclair – 1 sp.
- Bahuchashaka Subram. – 1 sp.
- Bahugada K.A.Reddy & Vasant Rao – 2 spp.
- Bahukalasa Subram. & Chandrash. – 1 sp.
- Balaniopsis P.M.Kirk – 4 spp.
- Balanium Wallr. – 1 sp.
- Barbarosporina Ķirulis – 1 sp.
- Barnettella D.Rao & P.Rag. Rao – 1 sp.
- Basauxia Subram. – 1 sp.
- Batistina Peres – 1 sp.
- Batistospora J.L.Bezerra & M.M.P. Herrera – 1 sp.
- Beauveriphora Matsush. – 1 sp.
- Beccopycnidium F.Stevens – 1 sp.
- Beejadwaya Subram. – 1 sp.
- Belemnospora P.M.Kirk – 7 spp.
- Bellulicauda B.Sutton – 2 spp.
- Beltramono Rashmi Dubey, A.K.Pandey bis & Manohar. – 1 sp.
- Beltraniomyces Manohar., D.K.Agarwal & Rao – 1 sp.
- Beniowskia Racib. – 4 spp.
- Benjpalia Subram. & Bhat – 1 sp.
- Berggrenia Cooke – 2 spp.
- Bhadradriella Nagaraju, Kunwar & Manohar. – 1 sp.
- Bhadradriomyces Sureshk., Manohar. & Kunwar – 1 sp.
- Bharatheeya D'Souza & Bhat – 3 spp.
- Bhatia W.A.Baker & Morgan-Jones – 2 spp.
- Biatoridium J.Lahm ex Körb. (1860) – 4 spp.
- Bibanasiella R.F.Castañeda & W.B.Kendr. – 1 sp.
- Bicoloromyces Heuchert, U.Braun & D.Hawksw. – 1 sp.
- Biflagellospora Matsush. – 1 sp.
- Biflagellosporella Matsush. – 1 sp.
- Biflua Jørgen Koch & E.B.G.Jones – 1 sp.
- Bimeris Petr. – 1 sp.
- Bioconiosporium Bat. & J.L.Bezerra – 2 spp.
- Biophomopsis Petr. – 3 spp.
- Bisbyopeltis Bat. & A.F.Vital – 1 sp.
- Bispora Corda – 31 spp.
- Bisseomyces R.F.Castañeda – 1 sp.
- Blastocatena Subram. & Bhat – 2 spp.
- Blastodictys M.B.Ellis – 1 sp.
- Blastofusarioides Matsush. – 1 sp.
- Blastophorella Boedijn – 1 sp.
- Blastophragma Subram. – 4 spp.
- Blastophragmia Jian Ma, L.G.Ma, X.G.Zhang & R.F.Castañeda – 1 sp.*
- Blennoria Moug. & Fr. – 4 spp.
- Blennoriopsis Petr. – 1 sp.
- Bleptosporium Steyaert – 4 spp.
- Blodgettia Harv. – 2 spp.
- Bostrichonema Ces. – 4 spp.
- Botryoderma Papendorf & H.P.Upadhyay – 4 spp.
- Botryodiplodina Dias & Sousa da Câmara – 1 sp.
- Botryomonilia Goos & Piroz. – 1 sp.
- Botryostroma Höhn. – 2 spp.
- Brachycephala J.S.Monteiro, Gusmão & R.F.Castañeda – 1 sp.
- Brachydesmiella G.Arnaud ex S.Hughes – 8 spp.
- Brachysporiellina Subram. & Bhat – 2 spp.
- Brachysporiopsis Yanna, W.H.Ho & K.D.Hyde – 1 sp.
- Braunomyces V.A. Melnik & Crous – 1 sp.
- Brefeldiopycnis Petr. & Cif. – 1 sp.
- Brencklea Petrak – 1 sp.
- Brevicatenospora R.F.Castañeda, Minter & Saikawa – 1 sp.
- Briosia Cavara – 6 spp.
- Brycekendrickia Nag Raj – 1 sp.
- Brykendrickia Rajn. K.Verma, Prasher, Rajeshk., Sushma, A.K.Gautam & R.F.Castañeda – 1 sp.*
- Bryophytomyces Cif. – 1 sp.
- Bulbilopycnis Matsush. – 1 sp.
- Bulbocatenospora R.F.Castañeda & Iturr. – 1 sp.
- Bullaserpens Bat., J.L.Bezerra & Cavalc. – 1 sp.

Top of page

== C ==
- Cacumisporium Preuss – 9 spp.
- Caeruleoconidia Zhurb. & Pino-Bodas – 2 spp.
- Calcarispora Marvanová & Marvan – 1 sp.
- Calceispora Matsush. – 2 spp.
- Callistospora Petr. – 1 sp.
- Calocline Syd. – 1 sp.
- Calongeomyces D.Hawksw. & Etayo – 1 sp.
- Camaroglobulus Speer – 1 sp.
- Camaropycnis E.K.Cash – 1 sp.
- Camarosporellum Tassi – 1 sp.
- Camarosporiopsis Abbas, B.Sutton & Ghaffar – 1 sp.
- Camposporidium Nawawi & Kuthub. – 3 spp.
- Candelabrum Beverw. – 7 spp.
- Candelosynnema K.D.Hyde & Seifert – 1 sp.
- Capitorostrum Bat. – 1 sp.
- Capnocheirides J.L.Crane & S.Hughes – 1 sp.
- Capnofrasera S.Hughes – 1 sp.
- Capsicumyces Gamundí, Aramb. & Giaiotti – 1 sp.
- Carnegieispora Etayo & F.Berger – 1 sp.
- Carnia Bat. – 1 sp.
- Carrismyces R.F.Castañeda & Heredia – 1 sp.
- Casaresia Gonz.Frag. – 1 sp.
- Castanedaea W.A.Baker & Partr. – 1 sp.
- Catenocuneiphora Matsush. – 1 sp.
- Catenophora Luttr. – 3 spp.
- Catenophoropsis Nag Raj & W.B.Kendr. – 1 sp.
- Catenosubulispora Matsush. – 1 sp.
- Catenosynnema Kodsueb, K.D.Hyde & W.H.Ho – 1 sp.
- Catenulaster Bat. & C.A.A.Costa – 1 sp.
- Catinopeltis Bat. & C.A.A.Costa – 1 sp.
- Cecidiomyces U.Braun & Zhurb. – 1 sp.
- Ceeveesubramaniomyces J.Pratibha, K.D.Hyde & Bhat – 1 sp.
- Cerastoma Quél.
- Ceratocladium Corda – 2 spp.
- Ceratophorum Sacc. – 2 spp.
- Ceratopycnis Höhn. – 2 spp.
- Ceratosporella Höhn. – 19 spp.
- Ceratosporium Schwein. – 11 spp.
- Ceuthodiplospora Died. – 1 sp.
- Ceuthosira Petr. – 1 sp.
- Ceuthosporella Petr. & Syd. – 1 sp.
- Chaetendophragmia Matsush. – 7 spp.
- Chaetoblastophorum Morgan-Jones – 1 sp.
- Chaetochalara B.Sutton & Piroz. – 7 spp.
- Chaetocytostroma Petr. – 1 sp.
- Chaetodiplis Clem. – 1 sp.
- Chaetodiplodina Speg. – 2 spp.
- Chaetopeltaster Katum. – 1 sp.
- Chaetophiophoma Speg. – 1 sp.
- Chaetoplaca Syd. & P.Syd. – 1 sp.
- Chaetopsis Grev. – 7 spp.
- Chaetopyrena Pass. – 2 spp.
- Chaetoseptoria Tehon. – 1 sp.
- Chalarodendron C.J.K.Wang & B.Sutton – 1 sp.
- Chalarodes McKenzie – 2 spp.
- Chantransiopsis Thaxt. – 3 spp.
- Characonidia Bat. & Cavalc. – 1 sp.
- Charomyces Seifert – 2 spp.
- Chasakopama Manohar., Bagyan., N.K.Rao & Kunwar – 1 sp.
- Cheilaria Lib. – 1 sp.
- Cheiroidea W.A.Baker & Morgan-Jones – 1 sp.
- Cheiromycella Höhn. – 3 spp.
- Cheiromyceopsis Mercado & J.Mena – 1 sp.
- Cheiromyces Berk. & M.A.Curtis – 6 spp.
- Cheiropolyschema Matsush. – 2 spp.
- Chiastospora Riess – 1 sp.
- Chithramia Nag Raj – 1 sp.
- Chlamydopsis Hol.-Jech. & R.F.Castañeda – 1 sp.
- Choanatiara DiCosmo – 2 spp.
- Choreospora Constant. & R.Sant. – 1 sp.
- Chrysachne Cif. – 2 spp.
- Chrysalidopsis Steyaert – 1 sp.
- Chryseidea Onofri – 1 sp.
- Ciferria Gonz.Frag. – 1 sp.
- Ciferrina Petr. – 1 sp.
- Ciferriopeltis Bat. & H.Maia – 1 sp.
- Ciferrioxyphium Bat. & H.Maia – 2 spp.
- Ciliochora Höhn. – 2 spp.
- Ciliophora Petr. – 2 spp.
- Ciliophorella Petr. – 2 spp.
- Ciliosporella Petr. – 2 spp.
- Circinoconiopsis A.Hern.-Gut. – 1 sp.
- Circinoconis Boedijn – 1 sp.
- Cissococcomyces Brain – 1 sp.
- Civisubramaniania Vittal & Dorai – 2 spp.
- Cladoconidium Bandoni & Tubaki – 1 sp.
- Cladoniicola Diederich, van den Boom & Aptroot – 2 spp.
- Cladosphaera Dumort. – 1 sp.
- Cladosporiopsis S.C.Ren & X.G.Zhang – 1 sp.
- Clasteropycnis Bat. & Cavalc. – 1 sp.
- Clathroconium Samson & H.C.Evans – 2 spp.
- Clathroporinopsis
- Clauzadeomyces Diederich – 1 sp.
- Clavariana Nawawi – 1 sp.
- Cleistocystis Sousa da Câmara – 1 sp.
- Cleistonium Speer – 1 sp.
- Cleistophoma Petr. & Syd. – 2 spp.
- Clypeochorella Petr. – 1 sp.
- Clypeolum Speg. – 8 spp.
- Clypeopatella Petr. – 1 sp.
- Clypeophialophora Bat. & Peres – 1 sp.
- Clypeopycnis Petr. – 3 spp.
- Clypeoseptoria F.Stevens & P.A.Young – 3 spp.
- Clypeostagonospora Punith. – 1 sp.
- Coccogloeum Petr. – 1 sp.
- Codonmyces Calat. & Etayo – 1 sp.
- Colemaniella Agnihothr. – 1 sp.
- Coleodictyospora Charles – 2 spp.
- Coleoseptoria Petr. – 1 sp.
- Colispora Marvanová – 3 spp.
- Colletoconis de Hoog & Aa – 1 sp.
- Colletosporium Link – 1 sp.
- Collostroma Petr. – 1 sp.
- Columnodomus Petr. – 1 sp.
- Columnothyrium Bubák – 1 sp.
- Comatospora Piroz. & Shoemaker – 1 sp.
- Comocephalum Syd. – 1 sp.
- Complexipes C.Walker – 2 spp.
- Condylospora Nawawi – 4 spp.
- Coniambigua Etayo & Diederich – 1 sp.
- Conioscyphopsis Goh & K.D.Hyde – 1 sp.
- Coniothyrina Syd. – 1 sp.
- Conjunctospora Udagawa & Uchiy. – 1 sp.
- Conostoma Bat. & J.L.Bezerra – 2 spp.
- Conostroma Moesz – 3 spp.
- Consetiella Hol.-Jech. & Mercado – 1 sp.
- Copromyces N.Lundq. – 1 sp.*
- Coremiella Bubák & K.Krieg. – 1 sp.
- Cornucopiella Höhn. – 2 spp.
- Cornutostilbe Seifert – 1 sp.
- Coronospora M.B.Ellis – 4 spp.
- Corynecercospora V.K.Pal, M.Akhtar, N.Ahmad, Kamal & D.K.Agarwal – 1 sp.
- Coryneliella Har. & P.Karst. – 1 sp.
- Corynesporella Munjal & H.S.Gill – 11 spp.
- Corynesporina Subram. – 1 sp.
- Corynesporopsis P.M.Kirk – 16 spp.
- Costanetoa Bat. & J.L.Bezerra – 1 sp.
- Crandallia Ellis & Sacc. – 4 spp.
- Craneomyces Morgan-Jones, R.C.Sinclair & Eicker – 1 sp.
- Craspedodidimella F.R.Barbosa, R.F.Castañeda & Gusmão – 1 sp.
- Creodiplodina Petr. – 1 sp.
- Creonecte Petr. – 1 sp.
- Creoseptoria Petr. – 1 sp.
- Creothyriella Bat. & C.A.A.Costa – 1 sp.
- Cribropeltis Tehon – 1 sp.
- Crinigera I.Schmidt – 1 sp.
- Crousobrauniella Sh.Kumar, Raghv. Singh, D.P.Singh & Kamal – 1 sp.
- Crustodiplodina Punith. – 1 sp.
- Cryptoceuthospora Petr. – 2 spp.
- Cryptocoryneopsis B.Sutton – 1 sp.
- Cryptosporium Kunze – 25 spp.
- Cryptumbellata Udagawa & Uchiy. – 1 sp.
- Ctenosporium R.Kirschner – 1 sp.
- Cubasina R.F.Castañeda – 2 spp.
- Culicidospora R.H.Petersen – 2 spp.
- Culicinomyces Couch, Romney & B.Rao – 3 spp.
- Curucispora Matsush. – 3 spp.
- Curvulariopsis M.B.Ellis – 1 sp.
- Cyanopatella Petr. – 1 sp.
- Cyanopyrenia Harada – 1 sp.
- Cyclomarsonina Petr. – 1 sp.
- Cylindrogloeum Petr. – 1 sp.
- Cylindromyces Manohar., D.K.Agarwal & N.K.Rao – 1 sp.*
- Cylindrothyrium Maire – 1 sp.
- Cylindroxyphium Bat. & Cif. – 1 sp.
- Cyrtidium Vain – 1 sp.
- Cyrtidula Minks – ca. 5 spp.
- Cyrtopsis Vain. – 1 sp.
- Cystodium Fée – 1 sp.
- Cystotricha Berk. & Broome – 1 sp.
- Cytodiscula Petr. – 1 sp.
- Cytogloeum Petr. – 1 sp.
- Cytonaema Höhn. – 2 spp.
- Cytoplacosphaeria Petr. – 2 spp.
- Cytosphaera Died. – 2 spp.
- Cytosporella Sacc. – 32 spp.
- Cyttariella Palm – 1 sp.

Top of page

== D ==
- Dactylifera Alcorn – 1 sp.
- Dactylosporium Harz – 2 spp.
- Dasysticta Speg. – 2 spp.
- Davisiella Petr. – 2 spp.
- Deichmannia Alstrup & D.Hawksw. – 1 sp.
- Delortia Pat. & Gaillard – 3 spp.
- Dendrodomus Bubák – 1 sp.
- Dendrographiella Agnihothr. – 1 sp.
- Dendrographium Massee – 8 spp.
- Dendrospora Ingold – 10 spp.
- Dendrosporium Plakidas & Edgerton ex J.L.Crane – 2 spp.
- Dendryphiosphaera Lunghini & Rambelli – 4 spp.
- Dennisographium Rifai – 2 spp.
- Dentocircinomyces R.F.Castañeda & W.B.Kendr. – 1 sp.
- Descalsia A.Roldán & Honrubia – 1 sp.
- Desertella Mouch. – 2 spp.
- Desmidiospora Thaxt. – 3 spp.
- Dexhowardia J.J.Taylor – 1 sp.
- Diaboliumbilicus I.Hino & Katum. – 1 sp.
- Diademospora B.E.Söderstr. & Bååth – 1 sp.
- Diarimella B.Sutton – 3 spp.
- Dichelostroma Bat. & Peres – 1 sp.
- Dicholobodigitus G.P.White & Illman – 1 sp.
- Dichotomophthoropsis M.B.Ellis – 2 spp.
- Dichotophora Whitton, K.D.Hyde & McKenzie – 2 spp.
- Dictyoceratosporella Y.R.Ma & X.G.Zhang – 3 spp.
- Dictyophrynella Bat. & Cavalc. – 1 sp.
- Dictyopolyschema M.B.Ellis – 1 sp.
- Dictyorostrella U.Braun – 1 sp.
- Dictyospiropes M.B.Ellis – 1 sp.
- Dictyotrichocladium Fiuza, Gusmão & R.F.Castañeda – 1 sp.
- Didymochaetina Bat. & J.L.Bezerra – 1 sp.
- Didymopsis Sacc. & Marchal – 5 spp.
- Didymosporina Höhn. – 1 sp.
- Diedickea Syd. & P.Syd. – 3 spp.
- Digicatenosporium S.M.Leão, Gusmão & R.F.Castañeda – 1 sp.
- Digitodochium Tubaki & Kubono – 1 sp.
- Digitopodium U.Braun, Heuchert & K.Schub. – 1 sp.
- Digitoramispora R.F.Castañeda & W.B.Kendr. – 4 spp.
- Dimastigosporium Faurel & Schotter – 2 spp.
- Diplocladiella G.Arnaud ex M.B.Ellis – 8 spp.
- Diplodinis Clem. – 1 sp.
- Diplodinula Tassi – 1 sp.
- Diploplenodomus Died. – 2 spp.
- Diplosporonema Höhn. – 1 sp.
- Diplozythiella Died. – 1 sp.
- Dipyrgis Clem. – 1 sp.
- Discogloeum Petr. – 1 sp.
- Discomycetoidea Matsush. – 1 sp.
- Discosiellina Subram. & K.R.C.Reddy – 1 sp.
- Discosporina Höhn. – 1 sp.
- Discotheciella Syd. & P.Syd – 1 sp.
- Discozythia Petr. – 1 sp.
- Dissitimurus E.G.Simmons, McGinnis & Rinaldi – 1 sp.
- Distobactrodesmium Z.Niu, K.Zhang & R.F.Castañeda – 1 sp.*
- Distophragmia R.F.Castañeda, S.M.Leão & Gusmão – 1 sp.
- Ditangifibula G.C.Adams – 1 sp.
- Domingoella Petr. & Cif. – 4 spp.
- Dothideodiplodia Murashk. – 1 sp.
- Dothioropsis Riedl – 1 sp.
- Drepanospora Berk. & M.A.Curtis – 1 sp.
- Drudeola Kuntze – 1 sp.
- Drumopama Subram. – 1 sp.
- Dryinosphaera Dumort. Eiona Kohlm. - ? spp.
- Dryosphaera Jørg.Koch & E.B.G.Jones – 3 spp.
- Dualomyces Matsush. – 2 spp.
- Dwayabeeja Subram. – 3 spp.
- Dwayaloma Subram. – 1 sp.
- Dwayalomella Brisson, Piroz. & Pauzé – 1 sp.
- Dwibahubeeja N.Srivast., A.K.Srivast. & Kamal – 1 sp.
- Dwibeeja Subram. – 1 sp.
- Dwiroopella Subram. & Muthumary – 1 sp.

Top of page

== E ==
- Ebollia Minter & Caine – 1 sp.
- Echinocatena R.Campb. & B.Sutton – 1 sp.
- Echinochondrium Samson & Aa – 1 sp.
- Echinoconidiophorum Pereira-Carv. & Dianese – 1 sp.
- Effetia Bartoli, Maggi & Persiani – 1 sp.*
- Eiona Kohlm. – 1 sp.
- Elachopeltella Bat. & Cavalc. – 2 spp.
- Elattopycnis Bat. & Cavalc. – 1 sp.
- Elegantimyces Goh, C.K.M.Tsui & K.D.Hyde – 1
- Ellisembiopsis T.S.Santa Izabel & Gusmão – 2 spp.
- Ellismarsporium R.F.Castañeda & X.G.Zhang – 7 spp.
- Elotespora R.F.Castañeda & Heredia – 1 sp.
- Embryonispora G.Z.Zhao – 1 sp.
- Enantioptera Descals – 2 spp.
- Endobotrya Berk. & M.A.Curtis – 1 sp.
- Endobotryella Höhn. – 1 sp.
- Endocolium Syd. – 1 sp.
- Endoconospora Gjaerum – 2 spp.
- Endocoryneum Petr. – 3 spp.
- Endogenospora R.F.Castañeda, O.Morillo & Minter – 1 sp.
- Endomelanconium Petr. – 4 spp.
- Endophragmiella B.Sutton – ca. 80 spp.*
- Endophragmiopsis M.B.Ellis – 2 spp.
- Endoplacodium Petr. – 1 sp.
- Endoramularia Petr. – 1 sp.
- Endosporoideus W.H.Ho, Yanna, K.D.Hyde & Goh – 1 sp.
- Endozythia Petr. – 1 sp.
- Enerthidium Syd. – 1 sp.
- Engelhardtiella A.Funk – 1 sp.
- Enridescalsia R.F.Castañeda & Guarro – 1 sp.
- Enthallopycnidium F.Stevens – 1 sp.
- Entoderma Hanula, Andreadis & M.Blackw. – 1 sp.
- Epaphroconidia Calat. & V.Atienza – 1 sp.
- Ephelidium C.W.Dodge & E.D.Rudolph – 1 sp.
- Epiclinium Fr. – 2 spp.
- Epicoccospora Budathoki & S.K.Singh – 2 spp.
- Episporogoniella U.Braun – 1 sp.
- Epistigme Syd. – 2 spp.
- Epithyrium (Sacc. spp. Trotter – 2 spp.
- Eriocercospora Deighton – 3 spp.
- Eriospora Berk. & Broome – 1 sp.
- Erispora Pat. – 1 sp.
- Esteya J.Y.Liou, J.Y.Shih & Tzean – 1 sp.
- Evanidomus Caball. – 1 sp.
- Everhartia Sacc. & Ellis – 6 spp.
- Everniicola D.Hawksw. – 1 sp.
- Eversia J.L.Crane & Schokn. – 2 spp.
- Excipularia Sacc. – 2 spp.
- Exophoma Weedon – 1 sp.
- Exosporella Höhn. – 1 sp.
- Exosporodiella Ganie, Azam & A.H.Wani – 1 sp.

Top of page

== F ==
- Fairmaniella Petr. & Syd. – 1 sp.
- Farriolla Norman – 1 sp.
- Favostroma B.Sutton & E.M. Davison – 1 sp.
- Feltgeniomyces Diederich – 4 spp.
- Fenestroconidia Calat. & Etayo – 1 sp.
- Fissuricella Pore, D'Amatao & Ajello – 1 sp.
- Flabellocladia Nawawi – 2 spp.
- Flabellospora Alas. – 6 spp.
- Flosculomyces B.Sutton – 2 spp.
- Frigidispora K.D.Hyde & Goh – 1 sp.
- Fujimyces Minter & Caine – 2 spp.
- Fuligomyces Morgan-Jones & Kamal – 4 spp.
- Fumagopsis Speg. – 2 spp.
- Furcaspora Bonar – 2 spp.
- Fusamen (Sacc.) P.Karst. – 2 spp.
- Fuscophialis B.Sutton – 4 spp.
- Fusticeps J.Webster & R.A.Davey – 5 spp.

Top of page

== G ==
- Gaeumanniella Petr. – 1 sp.
- Gallaicolichen Serux. & Lücking – 1 sp.
- Gampsonema Nag Raj – 1 sp.
- Gangliophora Subram. – 1 sp.
- Gangliostilbe Subram. & Vittal – 5 spp.
- Garnaudia Borowska – 3 spp.
- Gaubaea Petr. – 2 spp.
- Gelatinocrinis Matsush. – 1 sp.
- Gelatinopycnis Dyko & B.Sutton – 1 sp.
- Geminoarcus K.Ando – 3 spp.
- Gemmulina Descals & Marvanová – 1 sp.
- Geohypha (Fr.) Hennebert – 1 sp.*
- Gilmaniella G.L.Barron – 9 spp.
- Glaphyriopsis B.Sutton & Pascoe – 2 spp.
- Glioannellodochium Matsush. – 1 sp.
- Glioblastocladium Matsush. – 1 sp.
- Globoconidiopsis G.F.Sepúlveda, Pereira-Carv. & Dianese – 1 sp.
- Globoconidium G.F.Sepúlveda, Pereira-Carv. & Dianese – 1 sp.
- Gloeocoryneum Weindlm. – 3 spp.
- Gloeodes Colby – 1 sp.
- Gloeosporiella Cavara – 1 sp.
- Gloiosphaera Höhn. – 2 spp.
- Glutinium Fr. – 2 spp.
- Goidanichiella G.L.Barron ex W.Gams – 5 spp.
- Gonatobotryum Sacc. – 4 spp.
- Goniopila Marvanová & Descals – 1 sp.
- Goosiella Morgan-Jones, Kamal & R.K.Verma – 1 sp.
- Goosiomyces N.K.Rao & Manohar. – 2 spp.
- Grallomyces F.Stevens – 1 sp.
- Graphiothecium Fuckel – 6 spp.
- Groveolopsis Boedijn – 6 spp.
- Guarroa M.Calduch, Gené, Heredia & R.F.Castañeda – 1 sp.
- Guedea Rambelli & Bartoli – 3 spp.
- Guelichia Speg. – 6 spp.
- Gymnoxyphium Cif., Bat. & I.J.Araújo – 6 spp.
- Gyrophthorus Hafellner & Sancho – 3 spp.

Top of page

== H ==
- Hadronema Syd. & P.Syd. – 4 spp.
- Hadrosporium Syd. – 2 spp.
- Haematomyxa
- Halysiomyces E.G.Simmons – 1 sp.
- Hansfordiopeltis Bat. & C.A.A.Costa – 5 spp.
- Hansfordiopeltopsis M.L.Farr – 1 sp.
- Hapalosphaeria Syd. – 1 sp.
- Haplariopsis Oudem. – 2 spp.
- Haplobasidion Erikss. – 3 spp.
- Haplolepis Syd. – 3 spp.
- Haptocara Drechsler – 1 sp.
- Harmandiana B.de Lesd. (1914) – 1 sp.
- Harmoniella V.N.Boriss. – 2 spp.
- Harpographium Sacc. – 5 spp.
- Harpostroma Höhn. – 1 sp.
- Heimiodora Nicot – 1 sp.
- Helensiella Minter, R.F.Castañeda & Heredia – 1 sp.
- Helhonia B. Sutton – 1 sp.
- Helicofilia Matsush. – 2 spp.
- Helicogoosia Hol.-Jech. – 1 sp.
- Helicominopsis Deighton – 2 spp.
- Helicorhoidion S.Hughes – 6 spp.
- Helicosingula P.S.van Wyk, Marasas, Baard & Knox-Dav. – 1 sp.
- Helicothyrium I.Hino & Katum. – 1 sp.
- Helicoubisia Lunghini & Rambelli – 1 sp.
- Heliscella Marvanová – 2 spp.
- Heliscina Marvanová – 2 spp.
- Helminthosporiomyces G.F.Sepúlveda, Pereira-Carv. & Dianese – 1 sp.
- Helochora Sherwood – 1 sp.
- Hemicorynesporella Subram. – 1 sp.
- Hemidothis Syd. & P.Syd. – 1 sp.
- Hemisphaeropsis Petr. – 1 sp.
- Hendersoniella Tassi – 1 sp.
- Hendersonina E.J.Butler – 1 sp.
- Hendersoniopsis Höhn. – 1 sp.
- Hendersonula Speg. – 20 spp.
- Hendersonulina Petr. – 1 sp.
- Henfellra Halici, D.Hawksw., Z.Kocak. & M.Kocak – 1 sp.
- Henicospora P.M.Kirk & B.Sutton – 6 spp.
- Herposira Syd. – 1 sp.
- Herreromyces R.F.Castañeda & W.B.Kendr. – 1 sp.
- Heterocephalum Thaxt. – 2 spp.
- Heterosporiopsis Petr. – 1 sp.
- Heuflera Bail – 1 sp.
- Hexacladium D.L.Olivier – 1 sp.
- Himantia Pers. – 4 spp.
- Hinoa Hara & I.Hino – 2 spp.
- Hirudinaria Ces. – 2 spp.
- Hobsoniopsis D.Hawksw. – 1 sp.
- Hoehneliella Bres. & Sacc. – 2 spp.
- Holubovaea Mercado – 2 spp.
- Homalopeltis Bat. & Valle – 1 sp.
- Hoornsmania Crous – 1 sp.
- Hormiactis Preuss – 5 spp.
- Hormiscioideus M.Blackw. & Kimbr. – 1 sp.
- Hormocephalum Syd. – 1 sp.
- Hormographis Guarro, Punsola & Arx – 1 sp.
- Hughesinia J.C.Lindq. & Gamundí – 3 spp.
- Hyalobelemnospora Matsush. – 1 sp.
- Hyalocamposporium Révay & J.Gönczöl – 4 spp.
- Hyalocephalotrichum Nagaraju, Kunwar, Sureshk. & Manohar. – 1 sp.
- Hyalocladium Mustafa – 1 sp.
- Hyalocylindrophora J.L.Crane & Dumont – 3 spp.
- Hyalodermella Speg. – 1 sp.
- Hyalodictyum Woron. – 1 sp.
- Hyalohelicomina T.Yokoy. – 1 sp.
- Hyalopleiochaeta R.F.Castañeda, Guarro & Cano – 1 sp.
- Hyalopyrenia H.Harada – 1 sp.
- Hyalosynnema Matsush. – 1 sp.
- Hyalothyridium Tassi – 1 sp.
- Hydrometrospora J.Gönczöl & Révay – 1 sp.
- Hymenella Fr. – 11 spp.
- Hymeniopeltis Bat. – 3 spp.
- Hymenobactron (Sacc.) Höhn. – 1 sp.
- Hymenobia Nyl. – 1 sp.
- Hymenopsis Sacc. – 13 spp.
- Hyphodiscosia Lodha & K.R.C.Reddy – 5 spp.
- Hyphodiscosioides Matsush. – 1 sp.
- Hyphopolynema Nag Raj – 6 spp.
- Hyphostereum Pat. – 1 sp.
- Hyphothyrium B.Sutton & Pascoe – 1 sp.
- Hyphozyma de Hoog & M.T.Sm. – 4 spp.
- Hypnotheca Tommerup – 1 sp.
- Hypocline Syd. – 1 sp.
- Hypodermina Höhn. – 1 sp.
- Hypogloeum Petr. – 1 sp.
- Hypotrachynicola Etayo – 1 sp.
- Hysteridium P.Karst. – 1 sp.
- Hysterodiscula Petr. – 1 sp.
- Hysteropycnis Hilitzer – 1 sp.

Top of page

== I ==
- Ialomitzia Gruia – 1 sp.
- Idiocercus B.Sutton – 2 spp.
- Igneocumulus A.W.Ramaley – 10 spp.
- Imicles Shoemaker & Hambl. – 6 spp.
- Impudentia Vujanović – 1 sp.
- Inesiosporium R.F.Castañeda & W.Gams – 2 spp.
- Inifatiella R.F.Castañeda – 1 sp.
- Intercalarispora J.L.Crane & Schokn – 1 sp.
- Intralichen D.Hawksw. & M.S.Cole – 4 spp.
- Ionophragmium Peres – 1 sp.
- Irpicomyces Deighton – 3 spp.
- Ischnostroma Syd. & P.Syd. – 1 sp.
- Isthmoconidium Etayo & Fr.Berger – 1 sp.
- Isthmolongispora Matsush. – 11 spp.
- Isthmophragmospora Kuthub. & Nawawi – 2 spp.
- Isthmotricladia Matsush. – 3 spp.
- Ityorhoptrum P.M.Kirk – 4 spp.
- Iyengarina Subram. – 3 spp.

Top of page

== J ==
- Javonarxia Subram. – 2 spp.
- Jayarambhatia J.Pratibha – 1 sp.
- Jerainum Nawawi & Kuthub. – 1 sp.
- Jubispora B.Sutton & H.J.Swart – 1 sp.
- Junctospora Minter & Hol.-Jech. – 1 sp.

Top of page

== K ==
- Kalamarospora G. Delgado – 1 sp.
- Kalchbrenneriella Diederich & M.S. Christ. – 1 sp.
- Kaleidosporium Van Warmelo & B.Sutton – 1 sp.
- Kamatella Anahosur – 1 sp.
- Kamatia V.G.Rao & Subhedar – 1 sp.
- Kameshwaromyces Kamal, R.K.Verma & Morgan-Jones – 2 spp.
- Katherinomyces Khodos. – 1 sp.
- Keissleriomyces D.Hawksw. – 1 sp.
- Kendrickiella K.Jacobs & M.J.Wingf. – 1 sp.
- Ketubakia Kamat, Varghese & V.G.Rao – 1 sp.
- Kiliophora Kuthub. & Nawawi – 3 spp.
- Kionocephala P.M.Kirk – 1 sp.
- Kmetia Bres. & Sacc. – 1 sp.
- Kmetiopsis Bat. & Peres – 1 sp.
- Knemiothyrium Bat. & J.L.Bezerra – 1 sp.
- Kodonospora K.Ando – 1 sp.
- Kolletes Kohlm. & Volkm.-Kohlm. – 1 sp.
- Kontospora A.Roldán, Honrubia & Marvanová – 1 sp.
- Korunomyces Hodges & F.A.Ferreira – 3 spp.
- Kostermansinda Rifai – 4 spp.
- Kostermansindiopsis R.F.Castañeda – 1 sp.
- Kramabeeja G.V.Rao & K.A.Reddy – 1 sp.
- Kramasamuha Subram. & Vittal – 1 sp.
- Kreiseliella Braun – 1 sp.
- Kumanasamuha P.Rag. Rao & D.Rao – 5 spp.
- Kutilakesa Subram. – 2 spp.
- Kyphophora B.Sutton – 1 sp.

Top of page

== L ==
- Lacellina Sacc. – 3 spp.
- Lacellinopsis Subram. – 3 spp.
- Laciniocladium Petri – 1 sp.
- Lagenomyces Cavalc. & A.A.Silva – 1 sp.
- Lambdasporium Matsush. – 3 spp.
- Lambinonia Sérus. & Diederich – 1 sp.
- Laocoon J.C.David – 1 sp.
- Lappodochium Matsush. – 1 sp.
- Lasiodiplodiella Zambett. – 3 spp.
- Lasiothyrium Syd. & P.Syd. – 1 sp.
- Lasmeniella Petr. & Syd. – 13 spp.
- Latericonis G.V.Rao, K.A.Reddy & de Hoog – 1 sp.
- Lateriramulosa Matsush. – 5 spp.
- Laterispora Uecker, W.A.Ayers & P.B.Adams – 1 sp.
- Lawalreea Diederich – 1 sp.
- Lecaniocola Brain – 1 sp.
- Leeina Petr. – 1 sp.
- Leightoniomyces D.Hawksw. & B.Sutton – 2 spp.
- Lembuncula Cif. – 1 sp.
- Lemkea Morgan-Jones & R.C.Sinclair – 1 sp.
- Lepisticola W.Gams – 1 sp.
- Leprieurinella Bat. & H.Maia – 1 sp.
- Leptascospora Speg. – 1 sp.
- Leptochlamys Died. – 1 sp.
- Leptodermella Höhn. – 1 sp.
- Leptophyllosticta I.E.Brezhnev – 2 spp.
- Leptostromella (Sacc.) Sacc. – 2 spp.
- Leptothyrella Sacc. – 10 spp.
- Leptothyrina Höhn. – 1 sp.
- Leptothyrium Kunze – 2 spp.
- Leucoconiella Bat., H.Maia & Peres – 1 sp.
- Leucoconis Theiss. & Syd. – 1 sp.
- Leucodochium Syd. & P.Syd. – 1 sp.
- Leuliisinea Matsush. – 2 spp.
- Libertiella Speg. & Roum. – 7 spp.
- Lichenobactridium Diederich & Etayo – 1 sp.
- Lichenohendersonia Calat. & Etayo – 4 spp.
- Lichenopeziza Zukal – 1 sp.
- Lichenophoma Keissl. – 2 spp.
- Lichenopuccinia D.Hawksw. & Hafellner – 1 sp.
- Lichenostella Calat. & Etayo – 1 sp.
- Linkosia A.Hern. Gut. & B.Sutton – 12 spp.
- Linochorella Syd. & P.Syd. – 1 sp.
- Linodochium Höhn. – 5)
- Listeromyces Penz. & Sacc. – 1 sp.
- Lithopythium Bornet & Flahault – 3 spp.
- Lobatopedis P.M.Kirk – 5 spp.
- Loliomyces Maire – 1 sp.
- Lomaantha Subram. – 3 spp.
- Lomachashaka Subram. – 5 spp.
- Ludwigomyces Kirschst. – 1 sp.
- Luxuriomyces R.F.Castañeda – 1 sp.
- Luzfridiella R.F.Castañeda & W.B.Kendr. – 1 sp.
- Lylea Morgan-Jones – 6 spp.
- Lysotheca Cif. – 6 spp.

Top of page

== M ==
- Mackenziella Yanna & K.D.Hyde – 1 sp.
- Macroallantina Speer – 1 sp.
- Macrodiplodia Sacc. – 2 spp.
- Macrotrichum Grev. – 2 spp.
- Magmopsis Nyl. – 2 spp.
- Mahabalella B.Sutton & S.D.Patil – 4 spp.
- Manginella Bat. & H.Maia – 2 spp.
- Mapletonia B.Sutton – 1 sp.
- Margarinomyces Laxa – 1 sp.
- Martinellisia V.G.Rao & Varghese – 1 sp.
- Massalongina Bubák – 2 spp.
- Massariothea Syd. - 10 spp.
- Matsushimiella R.F.Castañeda & Heredia – 2 spp.
- Matsushimomyces V.G.Rao & Varghese – 2 spp.
- Medusamyces G.L.Barron & Szijarto – 1 sp.
- Megalodochium Deighton – 4 spp.
- Melanocephala S.Hughes – 5 spp.
- Melanophoma Papendorf & J.W.du Toit – 1 sp.
- Melophia Sacc. – 4 spp.
- Menidochium R.F.Castañeda & W.B.Kendr. – 1 sp.
- Mercadomyces J.Mena – 1 sp.
- Merismella Syd. – 6 spp.
- Mesocorynespora Jian Ma, X.G.Zhang & R.F.Castañeda – 1 sp.*
- Metadiplodia Syd. – 40 spp.
- Metazythia Petr. – 1 sp.
- Metazythiopsis M.Morelet – 1 sp.
- Microblastosporon Cif. – 1 sp.
- Microclava F.Stevens – 5 spp.
- Microdiscula Höhn. – 2 spp.
- Microdothiorella C.A.A.Costa & Sousa da Câmara – 1 sp.
- Microhendersonula Dias & Sousa da Câmara – 1 sp.
- Micromastia Speg. – 2 spp.
- Microperella Höhn. – 1 sp.
- Micropustulomyces R.W.Barreto – 1 sp.
- Microtyle Speg. – 1 sp.
- Microxyphiella Speg. – 15 spp.
- Microxyphiopsis Bat. – 2 spp.
- Milospium D.Hawksw. (1975) – 4 spp.
- Mindoa Petr. – 2 spp.
- Minimidochium B.Sutton – 8 spp.
- Minteriella Heredia, R.F.Castañeda & R.M.Arias – 1 sp.
- Minutophoma D.Hawksw. – 1 sp.
- Mirandina G.Arnaud ex Matsush. – ca. 10 spp.
- Miricatena Punith. & Spooner – 2 spp.
- Mirimyces Nag Raj – 1 sp.
- Mixtoconidium Etayo (1995) – 3 spp.
- Molgosphaera
- Monochaetiella E.Castell. – 3 spp.
- Monochaetinula Muthumary, Abbas & B.Sutton – 6 spp.
- Monochaetopsis Pat. – 1 sp.
- Monodia Breton & Faurel – 2 spp.
- Monodictys S.Hughes (1958) – 56 spp.
- Monodidymaria U.Braun – 5 spp.
- Monodisma Alcorn – 1 sp.
- Monostichella Höhn. – 15 spp.
- Moorella P.Rag. Rao & D.Rao – 3 spp.
- Moralesia Urries – 1 sp.
- Morrisographium M.Morelet – 8 spp.
- Mucosetospora M.Morelet – 1 sp.
- Muiogone Thaxt. – 2 spp.
- Muirella R.Sprague – 1 sp.
- Murogenella Goos & E.F.Morris – 3 spp.
- Mycelephas R.F.Castañeda – 2 spp.
- Mycocentrodochium K.Matsush. & Matsush. – 1 sp.
- Mycoenterolobium Goos – 3 spp.
- Mycohypallage B.Sutton – 2 spp.
- Mycopara Bat. & J.L.Bezerra – 1 sp.
- Mycospraguea U.Braun & Rogerson – 1 sp.
- Mycosticta Höhn. – 1 sp.
- Mycosylva M.C.Tulloch – 3 spp.
- Mycotodea Kirschst. – 14 spp.
- Mycousteria M.L.Farr – 2 spp.
- Myiocoprula Petr. – 2 spp.
- Myriellina Höhn. – 2 spp.
- Myriogonium
- Myrmecomyces Jouvenaz & Kimbr. – 1 sp.
- Myrotheciastrum Abbas & B.Sutton – 1 sp.
- Mystrosporiella Munjal & Kulshr. – 4 spp.
- Myxoparaphysella Caball. – 2 spp.
- Myxosporella Sacc. – 1 sp.
- Myxosporidiella Negru – 1 sp.
- Myxostomellina Syd. – 1 sp.
- Myxothyriopsis Bat. & A.F.Vital – 1 sp.
- Myxothyrium Bubák & Kabát – 1 sp.

Top of page

== N ==
- Naemosphaera P.Karst. – 1 sp.
- Naemosphaerella Höhn. – 2 spp.
- Nagrajia R.F.Castañeda & W.B.Kendr. – 1 sp.
- Nagrajomyces Mel’nik – 1 sp.
- Nakatopsis Whitton, McKenzie & K.D.Hyde – 2 spp.
- Nanoschema B.Sutton – 1 sp.
- Naothyrsium Bat. – 1 sp.
- Necraphidium Cif. – 1 sp.
- Negeriella Hennings, 1897 – 3 sp.
- Nematogonum Desm. – 1 sp.
- Nematographium Goid. – 5 spp.
- Nemozythiella Höhn. – 1 sp.
- Neoalpakesa Punith. – 1 sp.
- Neoarbuscula B.Sutton – 1 sp.
- Neobarclaya Sacc. – 2 spp.
- Neodiplodina Petr. – 1 sp.
- Neofuckelia Zeller & Goodd. – 1 sp.
- Neoheteroceras Nag Raj – 2 spp.
- Neojohnstonia B.Sutton – 2 spp.
- Neoligniella Naumov – 4 spp.
- Neomarssoniella U.Braun – 1 sp.
- Neomelanconium Petr. – 3 spp.
- Neopeltis Syd. – 3 spp.
- Neopericonia Kamal, A.N.Rai & Morgan-Jones – 1 sp.
- Neophoma Petr. & Syd. – 2 spp.
- Neoplaconema B.Sutton – 2 spp.
- Neopodoconis Rifai – 3 spp.
- Neospegazzinia Petr. & Syd. – 2 spp.
- Neottiospora Desm. – 2 spp.
- Neozythia Petr. – 1 sp.
- Neta Shearer & J.L.Crane – 10 spp.
- Nidulispora Nawawi & Kuthub. – 1 sp.
- Nigrolentilocus R.F.Castañeda & Heredia – 6 spp.
- Nigromacula Etayo – 1 sp.
- Nigropuncta D.Hawksw. – 2 spp.
- Nosophloea Fr. – 3 spp.
- Nothospora Peyronel – 1 sp.
- Novozymia W.P.Wu – 1 sp.
- Nummospora E.Müll. & Shoemaker – 1 sp.
- Nusia Subram. – 2 spp.
- Nyctalospora E.F.Morris – 1 sp.
- Nypaella K.D.Hyde & B.Sutton – 2 spp.

Top of page

== O ==
- Obeliospora Nawawi & Kuthub. – 5 spp.
- bstipipilus B.Sutton – 1 sp.
- Octopodotus Kohlm. & Volkm.-Kohlm. – 1 sp.
- Odontodictyospora Mercado – 1 sp.
- Ojibwaya B.Sutton – 1 sp.
- Omega B.Sutton & Minter – 1 sp.
- Oncopodium Sacc. – 12 spp.
- Oncospora Kalchbr. – 8 spp.
- Oncosporella P.Karst. – 1 sp.
- Oncostroma Bat. & Marasas – 1 sp.
- Onychophora W.Gams, P.J.Fisher & J.Webster – 1 sp.
- Oothyrium Syd. – 1 sp.
- Ophiosira Petr. – 1 sp.
- Orphanocoela Nag Raj – 3 spp.
- Ostracoderma Fr. – 3 spp.
- Ostracodermidium Mukerji – 1 sp.
- Oswaldina Rangel – 1 sp.

Top of page

== P ==
- Paathramaya Subram. – 5 spp.
- Pachycladina Marvanová – 3 spp.
- Palawaniopsis Bat., Cif. & Nascim. – 1 sp.
- Papilionospora V.G.Rao & B.Sutton – 1 sp.
- Pappimyces B.Sutton & Hodges – 1 sp.
- Paraaoria R.K.Verma & Kamal – 1 sp.
- Paraarthrocladium Matsush. – 1 sp.
- Parablastocatena Y.D.Zhang & X.G. Zhang – 1 sp.
- Paraceratocladium R.F.Castañeda – 6 spp.
- Parachionomyces Thaung – 1 sp.
- Paracostantinella Subram. & Sudha – 1 sp.
- Paracryptophiale Kuthub. & Nawawi – 2 spp.
- Paracytospora Petr. – 1 sp.
- Paradendryphiopsis M.B.Ellis – 5 spp.
- Paradidymobotryum C.J.K.Wang & B.Sutton – 1 sp.
- Paradiplodia Speg. ex Trotter – 6 spp.
- Paradischloridium Bhat & B.Sutton – 1 sp.
- Paradiscula Petr. – 1 sp.
- Parafulvia Kamal, A.N.Rai & Morgan-Jones – 1 sp.
- Parahaplotrichum W.A.Baker & Partr. – 1 sp.
- Paraharknessia Matsush. – 1 sp.
- Parahyalotiopsis Nag Raj – 1 sp.
- Paramassariothea Subram. & Muthumary – 1 sp.
- Paramenisporopsis Matsush. – 1 sp.
- Parapericonia M.B.Ellis – 2 spp.
- Parapericoniella U.Braun, Heuchert & K.Schub. – 1 sp.
- Paraphaeoisaria de Hoog & Morgan-Jones – 1 sp.
- Parapithomyces Thaung – 1 sp.
- Parapyricularia M.B.Ellis – 4 spp.
- Pararobillarda Matsush. – 1 sp.
- Parasphaeropsis Petr. – 1 sp.
- Parastigmatellina Bat. & C.A.A.Costa – 1 sp.
- Paratetraploa M.K.M.Wong & K.D.Hyde – 1 sp.
- Paratomenticola M.B.Ellis – 2 spp.
- Paratrichoconis Deighton & Piroz. – 4 spp.
- Paraulocladium R.F.Castañeda – 2 spp.
- Paspalomyces Linder – 1 sp.
- Patriciomyces D.Hawksw. – 1 sp.
- Pazschkeella Syd. & P.Syd. – 2 spp.
- Peethasthabeeja P.Rag. Rao – 1 sp.
- Pellionella (Sacc. spp. Sacc. – 1 sp.
- Peltasterinostroma Punith. – 1 sp.
- Peltasteropsis Bat. & H.Maia – 7 spp.
- Peltistroma Henn. – 1 sp.
- Peltistromella Höhn. – 1 sp.
- Peltosoma Syd. – 1 sp.
- Peltostromellina Bat. & A.F.Vital – 1 sp.
- Peltostromopsis Bat. & A.F.Vital – 1 sp.
- Penzigomyces Subram. – 13 spp.
- Perelegamyces R.F.Castañeda & W.B.Kendr. – 1 sp.
- Perizomella Syd. – 1 sp.
- Pestalozziella Sacc. & Ellis ex Sacc. – 4 spp.
- Petrakiopsis Subram. & K.R.C. Reddy – 1 sp.
- Phacostroma Petr. – 1 sp.
- Phacostromella Petr. – 1 sp.
- Phaeoblastophora Partr. & Morgan-Jones – 2 spp.
- Phaeocandelabrum R.F.Castañeda, Gusmão, Guarro & Iturr. – 3 spp.
- Phaeodactylium Agnihothr. – 7 spp.
- Phaeodiscula Cub. – 1 sp.
- Phaeodomus Höhn. – 3 spp.
- Phaeohiratsukaea Udagawa & Iwatsu – 1 sp.
- Phaeoidiomyces Dorn.-Silva & Dianese – 2 spp.
- Phaeolabrella Speg. – 1 sp.
- Phaeomonilia R.F.Castañeda, Heredia & R.M.Arias – 5 spp.
- Phaeomonostichella Keissl. ex Petr. – 1 sp.
- Phaeophomopsis Höhn. – 1 sp.
- Phaeoschizotrichum C.R.Silva, Gusmão & R.F.Castañeda – 1 sp.
- Phaeostalagmus W.Gams – 7 spp.
- Phaeostilbelloides Armando, Z.M.Chaves & Dianese – 1 sp.
- Phaeothyrium Petr. – 1 sp.
- Phaeotrichoconis Subram. – 8 spp.
- Phellostroma Syd. & P.Syd. – 1 sp.
- Phialoarthrobotryum Matsush. – 2 spp.
- Phialogeniculata Matsush. – 4 spp.
- Phialophaeoisaria Matsush. – 1 sp.
- Phialostele Deighton – 1 sp.
- Phialotubus R.Y.Roy & Leelav. – 1 sp.
- Phloeosporina Höhn. – 1 sp.
- Phomachora Petr. & Syd. – 2 spp.
- Phomachorella Petr. – 1 sp.
- Phomatosporella Tak.Kobay. & K.Sasaki – 1 sp.
- Phomyces Clem. – 1 sp.
- Phragmoconidium G.F.Sepúlveda, Pereira-Carv. & Dianese – 1 sp.
- Phragmopeltis Henn. – 5 spp.
- Phragmospathula Subram. & N.G.Nair – 3 spp.
- Phragmospathulella J.Mena & Mercado – 1 sp.
- Phthora d'Hérelle – 1 sp.
- Phylloedium Fr. – 1 sp.
- Phyllohendersonia Tassi – 25 spp.
- Physalidiella Rulamort – 2 spp.
- Physalidiopsis R.F.Castañeda & W.B.Kendr. – 1 sp.
- Piggotia Berk. & Broome – 3 spp.
- Pinatubo J.B.Manandhar & Mew – 1 sp.
- Piperivora Siboe, P.M.Kirk & P.F.Cannon – 1 sp.
- Piricaudilium Hol.-Jech. – 2 spp.
- Piricaudiopsis J.Mena & Mercado – 1 sp.
- Pirispora Faurel & Schotter – 1 sp.
- Pirostomella Sacc. – 2 spp.
- Pithosira Petr. – 1 sp.
- Pittostroma Kowalski & T.N.Sieber – 1 sp.
- Placella Syd. – 1 sp.
- Placodiplodia Bubák – 2 spp.
- Placonema (Sacc. spp. Petr. – 3 spp.
- Placonemina Petr. – 1 sp.
- Placosphaerina Maire – 1 sp.
- Placothea Syd. – 1 sp.
- Placothyrium Bubák – 1 sp.
- Plasia Sherwood – 1 sp.
- Plectonaemella Höhn. – 1 sp.
- Plectopeltis Syd. – 1 sp.
- Plectophomopsis Petr. – 1 sp.
- Plectopycnis Bat. & A.F.Vital – 4 spp.
- Plectosira Petr. – 1 sp.
- Plectronidiopsis Nag Raj – 1 sp.
- Plectronidium Nag Raj – 4 spp.
- Plenocatenulis Bat. & Cif. – 1 sp.
- Plenophysa Syd. & P.Syd. – 1 sp.
- Plenotrichopsis Bat. – 1 sp.
- Plenotrichum Syd. – 2 spp.
- Plenozythia Syd. & P.Syd. – 2 spp.
- Pleocouturea G.Arnaud – 2 spp.
- Plesiospora Drechsler – 1 sp.
- Pleurodesmospora Samson, W.Gams & H.C.Evans – 1 sp.
- Pleurodiscula Höhn. – 1 sp.
- Pleurodomus Petr. – 1 sp.
- Pleuropedium Marvanová & S.H.Iqbal – 3 spp.
- Pleurophomopsis Petr. – 7 spp.
- Pleuroplaconema Petr. – 2 spp.
- Pleuroplacosphaeria Syd. – 1 sp.
- Pleurotheciopsis B.Sutton – 6 spp.
- Pleurothyriella Petr. & Syd. – 1 sp.
- Pocillopycnis Dyko & B.Sutton – 1 sp.
- Podoplaconema Petr. – 1 sp.
- Podosporiella Ellis & Everh. – 4 spp.
- Podosporiopsis Jian Ma, X.G.Zhang & R.F.Castañeda – 2 spp.
- Podosporium Schwein. – 67 spp.
- Poikilosperma Bat. & J.L.Bezerra – 1 sp.
- Polybulbophiale Goh & K.D.Hyde – 1 sp.
- Polychaetella Speg. – 3 spp.
- Polycladium Ingold – 1 sp.
- Polydesmus Mont. – 14 spp.
- Polyetron Bat. & Peres – 1 sp.
- Polylobatispora Matsush. – 3 spp.
- Polyrostrata T.P.Devi & N.Mathur – 2 spp.
- Polystomellomyces Bat. – 1 sp.
- Polystratorictus Matsush. – 2 spp.
- Polytretophora Mercado – 3 spp.
- Porocladium Descals – 1 sp.
- Poroisariopsis M.Morelet – 1 sp.*
- Poropeltis Henn. – 1 sp.
- Porophilomyces U.Braun – 1 sp.
- Porosubramaniania Hol.-Jech. – 2 spp.
- Porrectotheca Matsush. – 1 sp.
- Potamomyces K.D.Hyde – 1 sp.
- Proboscispora Punith. – 1 sp.
- Protostegiomyces Bat. & A.F.Vital – 1 sp.
- Protostroma Bat. – 1 sp.
- Psammina Sacc. & M.Rousseau ex E.Bommer & M.Rousseau (1890) – 10 spp.
- Pseudoacrodictys W.A.Baker & Morgan-Jones – 14 spp.
- Pseudoanguillospora S.H.Iqbal – 3 spp.
- Pseudoaristastoma Suj.Singh – 1 sp.
- Pseudoasperisporium U.Braun – 3 spp.
- Pseudobasidiospora Dyko & B.Sutton – 1 sp.
- Pseudocanalisporium R.F.Castañeda & W.B.Kendr. – 1 sp.
- Pseudocenangium P.Karst. – 1 sp.
- Pseudochuppia Kamal, A.N.Rai & Morgan-Jones – 1 sp.
- Pseudoclathrosphaerina Voglmayr – 2 spp.
- Pseudoconium Petr. – 1 sp.
- Pseudocytoplacosphaeria Punith. & Spooner – 1 sp.
- Pseudocytospora Petr. – 1 sp.
- Pseudodichomera Höhn. – 3 spp.
- Pseudodiplodia (P.Karst. spp. Sacc. – 45 spp.
- Pseudodiscula Laubert – 2 spp.
- Pseudofuscophialis Sivan. & H.S.Chang – 1 sp.
- Pseudogaster Höhn. – 1 sp.
- Pseudographiella E.F.Morris – 3 spp.
- Pseudohepatica P.M.Jørg. – 1 sp.
- Pseudomicrodochium B.Sutton – 8 spp.
- Pseudoneottiospora Faurel & Schotter – 2 spp.
- Pseudopatellina Höhn. – 1 sp.
- Pseudopeltistroma Katum. – 1 sp.
- Pseudoperitheca Elenkin – 1 sp.
- Pseudopetrakia M.B.Ellis – 2 spp.
- Pseudophloeosporella U.Braun – 1 sp.
- Pseudophragmotrichum W.P.Wu, B.Sutton & Gange – 1 sp.
- Pseudopolystigmina Murashk. – 2 spp.
- Pseudoramularia Matsush. – 2 spp.
- Pseudorhizopogon Kobayasi – 1 sp.
- Pseudoschizothyra Punith. – 1 sp.
- Pseudosigmoidea K.Ando & N.Nakam. – 2 spp.
- Pseudostegia Bubák – 1 sp.
- Pseudothyrium Höhn. – 1 sp.
- Pseudotorula Subram. – 3 spp.
- Pseudotracylla B.Sutton & Hodges – 2 spp.
- Pseudotrichoconis W.A.Baker & Morgan-Jones – 1 sp.
- Pseudozythia Höhn. – 1 sp.
- Psilosphaeria Cooke – 1 sp.
- Pteromycula P.Cannon – 1 sp.
- Pterulopsis Wakef. & Hansf. – 1 sp.
- Pterygosporopsis P.M.Kirk – 2 spp.
- Pucciniospora Speg. – 1 sp.
- Pulchromyces Hennebert – 1 sp.
- Pullospora Faurel & Schotter – 2 spp.
- Pulvinella A.W.Ramaley – 1 sp.
- Punctillina Toro – 1 sp.
- Pycmaeosphaera Etayo & Diederich – 3 spp.
- Pycnidioarxiella Punith. & N.D.Sharma – 1 sp.
- Pycnidiopeltis Bat. & C.A.A.Costa – 1 sp.
- Pycnis Bref. – 1 sp.
- Pycnodactylus Bat., A.A.Silva & Cavalc. – 1 sp.
- Pycnodallia Kohlm. & Volkm.-Kohlm. – 1 sp.
- Pycnodermellina Bat. & H.Maia (1957) – 1 sp.
- Pycnoharknessia Matsush. – 1 sp.
- Pycnomma Syd. – 1 sp.
- Pycnomoreletia Rulamort – 2 spp.
- Pycnoseynesia Kuntze – 1 sp.
- Pycnothera N.D.Sharma & G.P.Agarwal – 1 sp.
- Pycnothyriella Bat. – 2 spp.
- Pycnothyrium Diederich – 6 spp.
- Pyramidospora Sv.Nilsson – 9 spp.
- Pyrenyllium Clem. – 2 spp.
- Pyrgostroma Petr. – 2 spp.
- Pyripnomyces Cavalc. – 1 sp.

Top of page

== Q ==
- Quadracaea Lunghini, Pinzari & Zucconi – 3 spp.
- Quadricladium Nawawi & Kuthub. – 1 sp.
- Quasidiscus B.Sutton – 1 sp.
- Queenslandia Bat. & H.Maia – 5 spp.
- Quezelia Faurel & Schotter – 1 sp.

Top of page

== R ==
- Raciborskiomyces Siemaszko – 4 spp.
- Radiatispora Matsush. – 1 sp.
- Raizadenia S.L.Srivast. – 1 sp.
- Ramakrishnanella Kamat & Ullasa ex Ullasa – 1 sp.
- Ramicapitulum Whitton, K.D.Hyde & McKenzie – 1 sp.
- Ramicephala Voglmayr & G.Delgado – 1 sp.
- Ramiphialis F.R.Barbosa, Fiúza & R.F.Castañeda – 1 sp.*
- Ramoconidiifera B.Sutton, Carmarán & A.I.Romero – 2 spp.
- Ranojevicia VRanoj. & Bubák (1910) – 1 sp.
- Redbia Deighton & Piroz. – 5 spp.
- Refractohilum D.Hawksw. – 5 spp.
- Repetoblastiella R.F.Castañeda, Minter & M.Stadler – 1 sp.
- Rhabdoclema Syd. – 2 spp.
- Rhabdogloeopsis Petr. – 2 spp.
- Rhabdostromella Höhn. – 1 sp.
- Rhabdostromina Died. – 3 spp.
- Rhexoampullifera P.M.Kirk – 3 spp.
- Rhexoprolifer Matsush. – 1 sp.
- Rhinotrichella G.Arnaud ex de Hoog – 4 spp.
- Rhipidocephalum Trail – 2 spp.
- Rhizosphaerina B.Sutton – 2 spp.
- Rhodesia Grove – 2 spp.
- Rhodesiopsis B.Sutton & R.Campb. – 2 spp.
- Rhodothallus Bat. & Cif. – 2 spp.
- Rhombostilbella Zimm. – 2 spp.
- Rhopalocladium Schroers, Samuels & W.Gams – 1 sp.
- Rhynchodiplodia Briosi & Farneti – 1 sp.
- Rhynchomyces Willk. – 1 sp.
- Rhynchoseptoria Unamuno – 1 sp.
- Rhynchosporina Arx – 2 spp.
- Riclaretia Peyronel – 1 sp.
- Rileya A.Funk – 1 sp.
- Robakia Petr. – 1 sp.
- Roeslerina Redhead (1985) – 3 spp.
- Rogergoosiella A.Hern.-Gut. & J.Mena – 1 sp.
- Roigiella Castañeda 1984 – 1 sp.
- Roscoepoundia Kuntze – 1 sp.
- Rosulomyces S.Marchand & Cabral – 1 sp.
- Rota Bat., Cif. & Nascim. – 1 sp.
- Ruggieria Cif. & Montemart. – 1 sp.

Top of page

== S ==
- Saania Zhurb. – 1 sp.
- Sadasivania Subram. – 3 spp.
- Sanjuanomyces R.F.Castañeda & W.B.Kendr. – 1 sp.
- Sarcinosporon D.S.King & S.C.Jong – 1 sp.
- Sarcoexcipula Etayo – 1 sp.
- Sarcophoma Höhn. – 3 spp.
- Sarophorum Syd. & P.Syd. – 1 sp.
- Satchmopsis B.Sutton & Hodges – 1 sp.
- Sativumoides S.C.Ren, Jian Ma & X.G.Zhang – 1 sp.
- Scaphidium Clem. – 1 sp.
- Sceptrifera Deighton – 1 sp.
- Schizothyra Bat. & C.A.A.Costa – 1 sp.
- Schizothyrella Thüm. – 1 sp.
- Schizothyropsis Bat. & A.F.Vital – 1 sp.
- Schizotrichum McAlpine – 1 sp.
- Schroeteria G.Winter – 1 sp.
- Schwarzmannia Pisareva – 1 sp.
- Scirrhophoma Petr. – 1 sp.
- Sclerographiopsis Deighton – 1 sp.
- Sclerographium Berk. – 4 spp.
- Scleromeris Syd. – 3 spp.
- Sclerophoma Höhn. – 30 spp.
- Scleropycnis Syd. & P.Syd. – 2)
- Sclerozythia Petch – 1 sp.
- Scolecobasidiella M.B.Ellis – 2)
- Scolecobeltrania Iturr., R.F.Castañeda & Rob.Fernández – 1 sp.
- Scolecodochium K. Matsush. & Matsush. – 1 sp.
- Scolecosporiella Petr. – 6 spp.
- Scolecotheca Søchting & B.Sutton – 1 sp.
- Scolecozythia Curzi – 1 sp.
- Scoliotidium Bat. & Cavalc. – 1 sp.
- Scopaphoma Dearn. & House – 1 sp.
- Scopulariella Gjaerum – 1 sp.
- Scothelius Bat., J.L.Bezerra & Cavalc. – 1 sp.
- Scutisporus K.Ando & Tubaki – 1 sp.
- Scutopeltis Bat. & H.Maia – 2 spp.
- Scutopycnis Bat. – 2 spp.
- Seifertia Partr. & Morgan-Jones 2002 – 3 spp.
- Seimatosporiopsis B.Sutton, Ghaffer & Abbas – 2 spp.
- Selenosira Petr. – 1 sp.
- Selenosporopsis R.F.Castañeda & W.B.Kendr. – 1 sp.
- Septocytella Syd. – 1 sp.
- Septogloeum Sacc. – 2 spp.
- Septomyxella (Höhn.) Höhn. – 1 sp.
- Septosporiopsis W.A.Baker & Morgan-Jones – 1 sp.
- Septosporium Corda – 5 spp.
- Septotrullula Höhn. – 2 spp.
- Sessiliospora D.Hawksw. – 1 sp.
- Setolibertella Punith. & Spooner – 1 sp.
- Setophiale Matsush. – 1 sp.
- Setosporella Mustafa & Abdul-Wahid – 1 sp.
- Seychellomyces Matsush. – 1 sp.
- Seynesiopsis Henn. – 1 sp.
- Shawiella Hansf. – 1 sp.
- Sheariella Petr. – 1 sp.
- Sheathnema Dubey & Moonambeth – 2 spp.
- Shivomyces Hosag. – 2 spp.
- Siamia V. Robert, Decock & R.F.Castañeda – 1 sp.
- Sigmatomyces Sacc. & P.Syd. – 1 sp.
- Similitrichoconis R.F.Castañeda, M.Vera & D.Sosa – 1 sp.*
- Simmonsiella J.L.Crane & A.N.Mill. – 1 sp.
- Sirexcipula Bubák – 1 sp.
- Sirocyphis Clem. – 1 sp.
- Sirogloea Petr. – 1 sp.
- Siroligniella Naumov – 1 sp.
- Sirophoma Höhn. – 3 spp.
- Siroplacodium Petr. – 6 spp.
- Siropleura Petr. – 1 sp.
- Siroscyphellina Petr. – 2 spp.
- Sirosperma Syd. & P.Syd. – 2 spp.
- Sirosphaera Syd. & P.Syd. – 2 spp.
- Sirosporonaemella Naumov – 1 sp.
- Sirothecium P.Karst. – 3 spp.
- Sirothyriella Höhn. – 2 spp.
- Sirothyrium Syd. & P.Syd. – 1 sp.
- Sirozythia Höhn. – 2 spp.
- Sirozythiella Höhn. – 1 sp.
- Sitochora H.B.P.Upadhyay – 1 sp.
- Slimacomyces Minter – 2 spp.
- Solheimia E.F.Morris, 1967r – 2 spp.
- Soloacrospora W.B.Kendr. & R.F.Castañeda – 2 spp.
- Solosympodiella Matsush. – 8 spp.
- Soloterminospora Matsush. – 1 sp.
- Spermatoloncha Speg. – 1 sp.
- Spermochaetella Cif. – 1 sp.
- Spermospora R.Sprague – 9 spp.
- Spermosporella Deighton – 4 spp.
- Sphaeridium Fresen. – 5 spp.
- Sphaeriostromella Bubák – 1 sp.
- Sphaeriothyrium Bubák – 2 spp.
- Sphaeromma H.B.P.Upadhyay – 2 spp.
- Sphaeronaema Fr. – 50 spp.
- Sphaerophoma Petr. – 2 spp.
- Sphaerulomyces Marvanová – 1 sp.
- Spinulospora Deighton – 1 sp.
- Spiralum J.L.Mulder – 2 spp.
- Spiropes Cif. – ca. 40 spp.
- Splanchospora Lar.N.Vassiljeva – 1 sp.
- Spondylocladiella Linder – 2 spp.
- Spondylocladiopsis M.B.Ellis – 2 spp.
- Sporhaplus H.B.P.Upadhyay – 1 sp.
- Sporidesmiopsis Subram. & Bhat – 6 spp.
- Sporodochiolichen Aptroot & Sipman (2011) – 4 spp.
- Sporoglena Sacc. – 1 sp.
- Sporophiala P.Rag. Rao – 3 spp.
- Sporotretophora Whitton, McKenzie & K.D.Hyde – 1 sp.
- Stachybotryella Ellis & Barthol. – 3 spp.
- Stachybotryna Tubaki & T.Yokoy. – 6 spp.
- Stagonopatella Petr. – 1 sp.
- Stagonopsis Sacc. – 4 spp.
- Stagonosporina Tassi – 1 sp.
- Stagonostromella Petr. & Syd. – 1 sp.
- Staheliella Emden – 2 spp.
- Stalagmochaetia Cif. & Bat. – 2 spp.
- Stanhughesiella R.F.Castañeda & D.W.Li – 1 sp.
- Stauronema (Sacc.) Syd., P.Syd. & E.J.Butler – 5 spp.
- Stauronematopsis Abbas, B.Sutton & Ghaffar – 1 sp.
- Staurophoma Höhn. – 1 sp.
- Stegonsporiopsis Van Warmelo & B.Sutton – 1 sp.
- Stellifraga Alstrup & Olech – 1 sp.
- Stellomyces Morgan-Jones, R.C. Sinclair & Eicker – 2 spp.
- Stellopeltis Bat. & A.F.Vital – 2 spp.
- Stellospora Alcorn & B.Sutton – 2 spp.
- Stellothyriella Bat. & Cif. – 2 spp.
- Stenocephalopsis Chamuris & C.J.K.Wang – 1 sp.
- Stenocladiella Marvanová & Descals – 1 sp.
- Stenospora Deighton – 1 sp.
- Stephembruneria R.F.Castañeda – 1 sp.
- Stevensomyces E.F.Morris & Finley, 1965 – 1 sp.
- Stevensonula Petr. – 1 sp.
- Stictopatella Höhn. – 1 sp.
- Stigmatellina Bat. & H.Maia – 1 sp.
- Stigmea Fr. – 1 sp.
- Stigmella Lév. – 28 spp.
- Stigmopeltis Syd. – 2 spp.
- Stilbellula Boedijn – 1 sp.
- Stilbodendron Syd. & P.Syd. – 1 sp.
- Stilbophoma Petr. – 1 sp.
- Strasseriopsis B. Sutton & Tak.Kobay. – 1 sp.
- Stratiphoromyces Goh & K.D.Hyde – 2 spp.
- Striosphaeropsis Verkley & Aa – 1 sp.
- Stromatocrea W.B.Cooke – 1 sp.
- Stromatopogon Zahlbr. – 3 spp.
- Stromatopycnis A.F.Vital – 1 sp.
- Stromatostysanus Höhn. – 3 spp.
- Strongylothallus Bat. & Cif. – 1 sp.
- Stygiomyces Coppins & S.Y.Kondr. – 1 sp.
- Stylaspergillus B.Sutton, Alcorn & P.J.Fisher – 1 sp.
- Subhysteropycnis Wedin & Hafellner – 1 sp.
- Subicularium M.L.Farr & Goos – 1 sp.
- Subulispora Tubaki – 8 spp.
- Suttoniella S.Ahmad – 4 spp.
- Suttonina H.C.Evans – 1 sp.
- Syamithabeeja Subram. & Natarajan – 1 sp.
- Sylviacollaea Cif. – 1 sp.
- Symphysos Bat. & Cavalc. – 1 sp.
- Sympodiocladium Descals – 1 sp.
- Sympodioclathra Voglmayr – 1 sp.
- Sympodioplanus R.C.Sinclair & Boshoff – 3 spp.
- Sympodiosynnema J.W.Xia & X.G. Zhang – 1 sp.
- Synchronoblastia Uecker & F.L.Caruso – 1 sp.
- Syncladium Rabenh. – 1 sp.
- Synnemacrodictys W.A.Baker & Morgan-Jones – 1 sp.
- Synnemaseimatoides K.Matsush. & Matsush. – 1 sp.
- Synnematomyces Kobayasi – 1 sp.
- Synostomina Petr. – 1 sp.
- Syphosphaera Dumort. – 1 sp.
- Systremmopsis Petr. – 1 sp.

Top of page

== T ==
- Taeniolina M.B.Ellis – 6 spp.
- Talekpea Lunghini & Rambelli – 1 sp.
- Talpapellis Alstrup & M.S.Cole – 5 spp.
- Tandonea M.D.Mehrotra – 1 sp.
- Tarsodisporus Bat. & A.A.Silva – 1 sp.
- Tectacervulus A.W.Ramaley – 1 sp.
- Telioclipeum Viégas – 1 sp.
- Temerariomyces B.Sutton – 1 sp.
- Teratosperma Syd. & P.Syd. – 11 spp.
- Teratospermopsis Jian Ma, X.G.Zhang & R.F.Castañeda – 1 sp.*
- Termitaria Thaxt. – 6 spp.
- Tetrabrachium Nawawi & Kuthub. – 1 sp.
- Tetrabrunneospora Dyko – 1 sp.
- Tetracoccosporium Szabó – 4 spp.
- Tetranacriella Kohlm. & Volkm.-Kohlm. – 1 sp.
- Tetranacrium H.J.Huds. & B.Sutton – 1 sp.
- Tetraposporium S.Hughes – 2 spp.
- Textotheca Matsush. – 1 sp.
- Thaptospora B.Sutton & Pascoe – 3 spp.
- Thirumalacharia Rathaiah – 1 sp.
- Tholomyces Matsush. – 1 sp.
- Thoracella Oudem. – 1 sp.
- Thrinacospora Petr. – 1 sp.
- Thyriostromella Bat. & C.A.A.Costa – 1 sp.
- Thyrostromella Höhn. – 3 spp.
- Thyrsidiella Höhn. ex Höhn. – 2 spp.
- Thyrsidina Höhn. – 1 sp.
- Tiarosporellivora Punith. – 1 sp.
- Ticogloea G.Weber, Spaaij & W.Gams – 2 spp.
- Ticosynnema R.F.Castañeda, Granados & Mardones – 1 sp.
- Titaea Sacc. – 23 spp.
- Titaeopsis B.Sutton & Deighton – 1 sp.
- Titaeospora Bubák – 2 spp.
- Tomenticola Deighton – 1 sp.
- Tompetchia Subram. – 1 sp.
- Toxosporiella B.Sutton – 1 sp.
- Toxosporiopsis B.Sutton & Sellar – 1 sp.
- Toxosporium Vuill. – 2 spp.
- Tracylla (Sacc.) Tassi, 1904 – 3 spp.
- Trematophoma Petr. – 2 spp.
- Tremellidium Petr. – 1 sp.
- Tretendophragmia Subram. – 1 sp.
- Tretocephala Subram. – 1 sp.
- Tretolylea Cantillo, R.F.Castañeda & Gusmão – 1 sp.
- Tretospeira Piroz. – 1 sp.
- Tretovularia Deighton – 1 sp.
- Tribolospora D.A.Reid – 1 sp.
- Tricellula Beverw. – 8 spp.
- Trichobolbus Bat. – 1 sp.
- Trichobotrys Penz. & Sacc. – 4 spp.
- Trichoconis Clem. – 21 spp.
- Trichodiscula Vouaux – 1 sp.
- Trichodochium Syd. – 3 spp.
- Trichomatoclava G.F.Sepúlveda, Pereira-Carv. & Dianese – 1 sp.
- Trichomatomyces Dorn.-Silva & Dianese – 1 sp.
- Trichomatosphaera Pereira-Carv., G.F.Sepúlveda & Dianese – 1 sp.
- Trichopeltulum Speg. – 1 sp.
- Trichoseptoria Cavara – 2 spp.
- Trichosporiella Kamyschko – 4 spp.
- Trichosporodochium Dorn.-Silva & Dianese – 1 sp.
- Trichotheca P.Karst. – 1 sp.
- Tricladiella K.Ando & Tubaki – 1 sp.
- Tricladiopsis Descals – 2 spp.
- Tricladiospora Nawawi & Kuthub. – 3 spp.
- Tricornispora Bonar – 1 sp.
- Trifurcospora K.Ando & Tubaki – 2 spp.
- Trigonosporium Tassi – 2 spp.
- Tripoconidium Subram. – 1 sp.
- Triposporina Höhn. – 2 spp.
- Triramulispora Matsush. – 3 spp.
- Triscelophorus Ingold – 8 spp.
- Triscelosporium Nawawi & Kuthub. – 1 sp.
- Trisulcosporium H.J.Huds. & B.Sutton – 1 sp.
- Tromeropsis Sherwood – 1 sp.
- Troposporium Harkn. – 1 sp.
- Troposporopsis Whitton, McKenzie & K.D.Hyde – 2 spp.
- Tryblidiopycnis Höhn. – 1 sp.
- Tryssglobulus B.Sutton & Pascoe – 1 sp.
- Tuberculispora Deighton & Piroz. – 1 sp.
- Tulipispora Révay & Gönczöl – 1 sp.*
- Tunicago B.Sutton & Pollack – 2 spp.
- Turturconchata J.L.Chen, T.L.Huang & Tzean – 2 spp.
- Tympanosporium W.Gams – 1 sp.

Top of page

== U ==
- Uberispora Piroz. & Hodges – 4 spp.
- Ubrizsya Negru – 1 sp.
- Ulocoryphus Michaelides, L.Hunter & W.B.Kendr. – 1 sp.
- Umbellidion B.Sutton & Hodges – 1 sp.
- Uniseta Ciccar. – 1 sp.
- Urohendersonia Speg. – 5 spp.
- Urohendersoniella Petr. – 1 sp.
- Uvarispora Goos & Piroz. – 1 sp.

Top of page

== V ==
- Vagnia D.Hawksw. & Miądl. – 1 sp.
- Vanakripa Bhat, W.B.Kendr. & Nag Raj – 9 spp.
- Vanbeverwijkia Agnihothr. – 1 sp.
- Vanderystiella Henn. – 1 sp.
- Vanterpoolia A.Funk – 1 sp.
- Varioseptispora L.Qiu, Jian Ma, R.F.Castañeda & X.G.Zhang – 4 spp.*
- Vasudevella Chona, Munjal & Bajaj – 1 sp.
- Velloziomyces Armando, Z.M.Chaves & Dianese – 1 sp.
- Velutipila D.Hawksw. – 1 sp.
- Ventrographium H.P.Upadhyay, Cavalc. & A.A.Silva – 1 sp.
- Venustocephala Matsush. – 2 spp.
- Venustosynnema R.F.Castañeda & W.B.Kendr. – 3 spp.
- Veracruzomyces Mercado, Guarro, Heredia & J.Mena – 1 sp.
- Veramycella G.Delgado – 1 sp.
- Veramyces Matsush. – 1 sp.
- Verdipulvinus A.W.Ramaley – 1 sp.
- Veronaella Subram. & K.R.C.Reddy – 1 sp.
- Veronidia Negru – 1 sp.
- Verrucariella S.Ahmad – 1 sp.
- Verrucophragmia Crous, M.J.Wingf. & W.B.Kendr. – 1 sp.
- Verticicladus Matsush. – 3 spp.
- Vesicladiella Crous & M.J.Wingf. – 1 sp.
- Vesiculohyphomyces Armando, Pereira-Carv. & Dianese – 1 sp.
- Vestigium Piroz. & Shoemaker – 2 spp.
- Virgariella S.Hughes – 11 spp.
- Viridiannula Etayo – 1 sp.
- Vittalia Gaws & Bhat – 1 sp.
- Vizellopsidites M.A.Khan, M.Bera & Bera – 1 sp.
- Vouauxiella Petr. & Syd. – 3 spp.

Top of page

== W ==
- Waihonghopes Yanna & K.D.Hyde – 1 sp.
- Wardinella Bat. & Peres – 1 sp.
- Waydora B.Sutton 1976 – 1 sp.
- Websteromyces W.A.Baker & Partr. – 2 spp.
- Weufia Bhat & B.Sutton – 1 sp.
- Wolkia Ramsb. – 1 sp.

Top of page

== X ==
- Xenidiocercus Nag Raj – 1 sp.
- Xenochora Petr. – 1 sp.
- Xenodomus Petr. – 1 sp.
- Xenoheteroconium Bhat, W.B.Kendr. & Nag Raj – 1 sp.
- Xenokylindria DiCosmo, S.M.Berch & W.B.Kendr. – 2 spp.
- Xenomyxa Syd. – 1 sp.
- Xenopeltis Syd. & P.Syd. – 1 sp.
- Xenoplaca Petr. – 1 sp.
- Xenostroma Höhn. – 1 sp.
- Xeroconium D.Hawksw. – 1 sp.
- Xiphomyces Syd. & P.Syd. – 2 spp.
- Xiuguozhangia K.Zhang, R.F.Castañeda, Jian Ma & L.G.Ma – 5 spp.
- Xylochia B.Sutton – 2 spp.
- Xyloglyphis Clem. – 1 sp.
- Xylohypha (Fr.) E.W.Mason – 6 spp.
- Xylohyphopsis W.A.Baker & Partr. – 3 spp.

Top of page

== Y ==
- Yalomyces Nag Raj – 6 spp.
- Yinmingella Goh, K.M.Tsui & K.D.Hyde – 1 sp.
- Ypsilomyces D.A.C. Almeida & Gusmão – 1 sp.
- Yuccamyces Gour, Dyko & B.Sutton – 6 spp.
- Yunnania H.Z.Kong – 3 spp.

Top of page

== Z ==
- Zakatoshia B.Sutton – 2 spp.
- Zebrospora McKenzie – 1 sp.
- Zelandiocoela Nag Raj – 1 sp.
- Zelodactylaria A.C.Cruz, Gusmão & R.F.Castañeda – 1 sp.
- Zelopelta B.Sutton & R.D.Gaur – 1 sp.
- Zelosatchmopsis Nag Raj – 1 sp.
- Zernya Petr. (1947) - 1 sp.
- Zetesimomyces Nag Raj – 1 sp.
- Zevadia J.C. David & D. Hawksw. (1995) - 1 sp.
- Zilingia Petr. – 1 sp.
- Zinzipegasa Nag Raj – 1 sp.
- Zopheromyces B.Sutton & Hodges – 1 sp.
- Zunura Nag Raj – 1 sp.
- Zythia Fr. – 1 sp.
- Zyxiphora B.Sutton – 1 sp.

Top of page

== See also ==
- List of Dothideomycetes genera incertae sedis
