= Aderkomyces =

Scientific classification
- Kingdom: Fungi
- Division: Ascomycota
- Class: Lecanoromycetes
- Order: Graphidales
- Family: Gomphillaceae
- Genus: Aderkomyces; Bat. (1961)

Type species
- Aderkomyces couepiae Bat. (1961)

Genus of lichen-forming fungi

Aderkomyces is a genus of lichen-forming fungi in the family Gomphillaceae. Originally established in 1961 for a single species from Brazil, the genus was later expanded to include many species previously classified in the related genus Tricharia, all sharing distinctive white bristle-like structures and flattened fruiting bodies. Recent molecular studies suggest that Aderkomyces as currently defined may not represent a natural evolutionary group, leading to ongoing reclassification of many species into other genera.

== Taxonomy ==
Aderkomyces was introduced in 1961 by the Brazilian mycologist Augusto Chaves Batista for a foliicolous lichen with fan-shaped (flabelliform) hyphophores, Aderkomyces couepiae. That species was later transferred to Tricharia as T. couepiae. In their family-wide revision of the family Gomphillaceae, Robert Lücking, Emmanuël Sérusiaux and Antonín Vězda resurrected Aderkomyces to accommodate a set of species previously placed in Tricharia (in the loose sense) that share white setae, often applanate (flattened) apothecia with a hyphal excipulum, and at least partly flabellate hyphophores. They treated a "core group" centred on the type A. couepiae and including Tricharia heterella (with Psathyromyces rosacearum as its synonym), whose members characteristically have a smooth thallus, large applanate apothecia and flabelliform hyphophores.

The same work outlined additional groupings now placed in Aderkomyces: one centred on T. cubana and T. guatemalensis with small, sessile, dark apothecia and an almost prosoplectenchymatous excipulum; a second around T. albostrigosa, with sessile, pale apothecia and a hyphal excipulum; and a residual set centred on T. cretacea whose relationships remain unclear owing to poorly known hyphophores and/or diahyphae. Overall, Aderkomyces is distinguished within the Echinoplaca–Tricharia grade by its white setae, non-crystalline thallus and hyphal excipulum, whereas superficially similar Arthotheliopsis differs by having Echinoplaca-like adnate apothecia and slightly differentiated diahyphae.

As part of regularising the genus concept, Lücking and colleagues made numerous new combinations in Aderkomyces for species formerly placed in Tricharia (and, in one case, under other names), including A. albostrigosus, A. armatus, A. carneoalbus, A. cretaceus, A. cubanus, A. deslooveri, A. dilatatus, A. fumosus, A. heterellus and A. guatemalensis, among others. These changes reflect the shared character suite (white setae; hyphal excipulum; flabellate or related hyphophore types) that separates Aderkomyces from both Tricharia s.str. and allied genera within Gomphillaceae.

A 2024 morphology-based 'phylogenetic binning' analysis—assigning species to likely evolutionary groups from their traits—showed that Aderkomyces is polyphyletic, with its species split among multiple lineages. The type species, A. couepiae, binned with Arthotheliopsis (100% support), whereas a separate clade containing sequenced A. papilliferus and A. dilatatus represents Aderkomyces in the strict sense (sensu stricto). The authors note that, if future sequencing confirms the type placement, Aderkomyces would apply to the Arthotheliopsis-like clade and the "papilliferus clade" would require a different generic name.

The same analysis reassigns several species previously placed in Aderkomyces to other genera now recognised in the family: e.g., A. heterellus, A. planus and A. pruinosus with Psathyromyces; A. albostrigosus, A. deslooveri, A. microcarpus, A. guatemalensis and A. verrucosus with Spinomyces; A. carneoalbus, A. purulhensis and (provisionally) A. lobulicarpus with Roselviria; A. microtrichus in the Calenia–Echinoplaca grade; A. verruciferus with mixed signal (often with Verruciplaca); and several names (e.g. A. cretaceus, A. cubanus, A. fumosus, A. ramiferus, A. subplanus) remaining unresolved. Many of these transfers were formalised alongside the description of new genera in a companion work.

== Species ==
As of July 2021, Species Fungorum accepts 28 species of Aderkomyces.

- Aderkomyces armatus (Vězda) Lücking, Sérus. & Vězda (2005)
- Aderkomyces brevipilosus (Kalb & Vězda) Lücking, Sérus. & Vězda (2005)
- Aderkomyces couepiae Bat. (1961)
- Aderkomyces cretaceus (Vězda) Lücking, Sérus. & Vězda (2005)
- Aderkomyces cubanus (Vězda) Lücking, Sérus. & Vězda (2005)
- Aderkomyces dilatatus (Vězda) Lücking, Sérus. & Vězda (2005)
- Aderkomyces fumosus (Kalb & Vězda) Lücking, Sérus. & Vězda (2005)
- Aderkomyces gomezii Lücking (2008)
- Aderkomyces lobulimarginatus Sipman & Lücking (2005)
- Aderkomyces papilliferus (Lücking) Lücking, Sérus. & Vězda (2005)
- Aderkomyces ramiferus (Sérus.) Lücking, Sérus. & Vězda (2005)
- Aderkomyces rigidus Lücking & Sipman (2008)
- Aderkomyces sikkimensis Pinokiyo, Kr.P. Singh & Lücking (2006)
- Aderkomyces subalbostrigosus (Lücking) Lücking, Sérus. & Vězda (2005)
- Aderkomyces subplanus (Kalb & Vězda) Lücking, Sérus. & Vězda (2005)
- Aderkomyces testaceus (Kalb & Vězda) Lücking, Sérus. & Vězda (2005)
- Aderkomyces thailandicus Papong, Boonpr. & Lücking (2011)
