= Aderkomyces thailandicus =

Scientific classification
- Domain: Eukaryota
- Kingdom: Fungi
- Division: Ascomycota
- Class: Lecanoromycetes
- Order: Graphidales
- Family: Gomphillaceae
- Genus: Aderkomyces
- Species: A. thailandicus

Binomial name
- Aderkomyces thailandicus Papong, Boonpragob & Lücking (2011)

Species of lichen

Aderkomyces thailandicus is a species of corticolous (bark-dwelling), crustose lichen in the family Gomphillaceae. Found in the lower montane rainforests of Thailand, it was described as new to science in 2011.

== Taxonomy ==
Aderkomyces thailandicus was first formally described by lichenologists Khwanruan Butsatorn Papong, Kansri Boonpragob, and Robert Lücking as a new species in 2011. The name of the species is derived from the country where it was discovered. The type specimen was collected by the first author in February 2006 at Huai Nam Dung National Park in Chiang Mai Province, Thailand.

== Description ==
Aderkomyces thailandicus is an epiphyllous lichen with a crustose, verrucose thallus, or vegetative body. It has a greenish-grey colour, and the thallus is 10–15 μm thick. The lichen also features white, long sterile setae, which are hair-like structures, measuring 2–2.5 mm in length.

The lichen's apothecia, or spore-producing structures, are initially immersed-erumpent with thin marginal lobules, but they eventually become broadly sessile to adnate with a slightly prominent margin. The apothecia are light grey-brown, sometimes with an orange tinge, and range from 0.2 to 0.5 mm in diameter.

The excipulum, a tissue surrounding the hymenium, comprises radiating hyphae embedded in a gelatinous matrix and is colourless. The hymenium, the fertile layer containing asci and paraphyses, is also colourless and measures 35–50 μm in height. The asci, or spore-producing sacs, are annelasceous, clavate, and colourless. They measure 35–40 by 18–20 μm and contain 2–4 ellipsoid, muriform, and colourless ascospores, which are 17–22 by 12–14 μm in size. No secondary chemical substances were detected in the lichen using thin-layer chromatography.

This species is recognized by its initially immersed-erumpent apothecia, which are similar to those found in several Gyalideopsis species, and its combination of verrucose thallus and submuriform ascospores with 2-4 per ascus. No other Aderkomyces species has a similar combination of characteristics, making Aderkomyces thailandicus distinct from its relatives. Although the neotropical A. gomezii shares some similarities, it differs by having a smooth thallus and larger ascospores. Additionally, Aderkomyces thailandicus differs from Gyalideopsis species due to the presence of sterile setae, which are absent in Gyalideopsis.

== Habitat and distribution ==
Aderkomyces thailandicus is known from several collections originating from the lower montane rainforests of Thailand. It tends to grow in the understory of these forests, specifically in areas with more light. A. armatus is the only other species of Aderkomyces known to occur in Thailand.
