= Gyalideopsis altamirensis =

Scientific classification
- Kingdom: Fungi
- Division: Ascomycota
- Class: Lecanoromycetes
- Order: Graphidales
- Family: Gomphillaceae
- Genus: Gyalideopsis
- Species: G. altamirensis

Binomial name
- Gyalideopsis altamirensis Lücking & L.Umaña (2006)
- Holotype: La Amistad International Park, Costa Rica

Species of lichen

Gyalideopsis altamirensis is a species of corticolous (bark-dwelling) crustose lichen in the family Gomphillaceae, first described in 2006 from specimens collected in Costa Rica as part of the Ticolichen biodiversity inventory project. The pale greenish-grey lichen forms thin, shiny crusts on tree bark in montane rainforest environments, particularly in secondary forests dominated by Cecropia trees, and is known only from three locations in Costa Rica. It reproduces through distinctive brown to purplish-brown disc-shaped structures that produce large, colourless spores, and while specialized reproductive structures called hyphophores have not been observed in this species, it shows morphological similarities to several leaf-dwelling relatives as well as to other bark-dwelling species from which it differs primarily in having lighter-coloured fruiting bodies with more prominent margins.

== Taxonomy ==
Gyalideopsis altamirensis was formally described in 2006 by the lichenologists Robert Lücking and Loengrin Umaña. The species epithet altamirensis refers to its type locality, Altamira Station in Costa Rica. The type specimen was collected in the province of Puntarenas, within the Cordillera de Talamanca. It was found in La Amistad International Park, part of the La Amistad Pacífico Conservation Area, at the Altamira Station, about 20 km (12 mi) north of San Vito near Finca Colorado. The collection site was at an elevation of 1,600–1,800 m (5,200–5,900 ft) in the montane rainforest zone. The habitat consisted of secondary forest and open secondary vegetation dominated by Cecropia.

Although specialized reproductive structures called hyphophores have not been observed in this species, it shows morphological similarities to several leaf-dwelling relatives, including G. albopruinosa, G. arvidssonii, G. intermedia, and G. laevithallina. Among species that grow on bark, its closest relatives appear to be G. aequatoriana and G. vainioi, though these differ in having darker apothecia (fruiting bodies) with a less prominent margin.

== Description ==
Gyalideopsis altamirensis forms a crustose (crust-like) thallus that grows on bark. The thallus is continuous, measuring 30–60 mm across and only 10–20 μm thick, with a cartilaginous outer layer. Its surface is irregularly warty (verrucose) due to clusters of calcium oxalate crystals. The lichen is pale greenish-grey in colour and has a shiny (nitidous) appearance. Like all lichens, G. altamirensis is a symbiotic association between a fungus and an alga. The photosynthetic partner (photobiont) belongs to a green algal group called trebouxioid algae, with cells measuring 5–9 μm in diameter.

The reproductive structures (apothecia) are broadly attached to the surface (sessile), round to irregular in outline, measuring 0.3–0.6 mm in diameter and 80–120 μm in height. The disc of the apothecia is flat, brown to purplish brown, sometimes covered with a thin white powdery coating (pruina). The apothecial margin is distinct, slightly raised, and coloured either the same as the disc or slightly paler.

The spore-producing layer (hymenium) is colorless and 60–80 μm high. The spore sacs (asci) are broadly club-shaped, measuring 50–70 by 25–40 μm. Each ascus produces a single, ellipsoid spore that is muriform (divided by both longitudinal and transverse walls), with slight constrictions at the dividing walls. The spores measure 50–70 by 20–35 μm, are 2–2.5 times as long as broad, and are colourless.

== Habitat and distribution ==
Gyalideopsis altamirensis is known only from Costa Rica, where it has been collected from several localities:

- Altamira Station in La Amistad International Park (La Amistad Pacífico Conservation Area), 20 km north of San Vito
- Volcán Tenorio National Park (Pilón Biological Station)
- Hitoy Cerere Biological Reserve

The species inhabits montane rainforest zones, growing in secondary forests and open secondary vegetation dominated by Cecropia trees. It has been found at elevations ranging from 100 to 1,800 m (330 to 5,910 ft) above sea level. The lichen grows primarily on the bark of trees and shrubs, particularly on branches and trunks. It appears to prefer humid, montane environments, which is consistent with many other members of the genus Gyalideopsis. G. altamirensis is one of 27 Gyalideopsis species that have been reported from Costa Rica.
