= Jamesiella chaverriae =

Scientific classification
- Kingdom: Fungi
- Division: Ascomycota
- Class: Lecanoromycetes
- Order: Graphidales
- Family: Gomphillaceae
- Genus: Jamesiella
- Species: J. chaverriae

Binomial name
- Jamesiella chaverriae Chaves, L.Umaña & Lücking (2006)
- Holotype: Tenorio Volcano National Park, Costa Rica

Species of lichen

Jamesiella chaverriae is a species of corticolous (bark-dwelling), crustose lichen in the family Gomphillaceae. Described as a new species in 2006, it is found in Costa Rica and Brazil.

== Taxonomy ==
Jamesiella chaverriae was first formally described by José Luis Chaves, Loengrin Umaña, and Robert Lücking in 2006. The species was discovered as part of the TICOLICHEN project, a large-scale biodiversity inventory of lichens in Costa Rica. It was included in the first annotated checklist of Costa Rican fungi in 2024.

The genus Jamesiella was created as a segregate from the larger genus Gyalideopsis based on detailed morphological analysis. Jamesiella chaverriae is closely related to other species in the genus, including J. anastomosans, J. scotica, and J. perlucida, which all share distinctive reproductive structures.

== Description ==
Jamesiella chaverriae has a thin, crustose (crust-like) thallus that grows continuously over its substrate. The thallus is pale greenish-grey, slightly shiny (described as "nitidous" in technical terminology), and smooth, lacking calcium oxalate crystals that are present in some related species. The thallus measures about 5–10 mm across and 10–20 μm thick, with a cartilaginous outer layer.

The species is distinguished by its unique reproductive structures called "thlasidia" (a specialized form of hyphophores – fungal reproductive structures). These structures are flask-shaped with an inflated lower part and a tapering, often thinly ciliate (hair-like) apex. They measure 0.12–0.15 mm in height and 60–80 μm thick at the widest point, narrowing to 15–25 μm at the apex. The thlasidia are pale greenish-white and slightly translucent, with a constricted base that leaves a ring-shaped mark on the thallus surface when detached.

Microscopically, the thlasidia are composed of densely packed, parallel (periclinal) hyphae approximately 1 μm thick, with a more irregular tissue including small algal cells (3–5 μm in diameter) in the centre. The apex features a crown of thin hair-like structures formed by elongated fungal cells measuring 25–35 by 1 μm. No apothecia (disc-shaped fungal fruiting bodies) have been observed in this species, which distinguishes it from other members of the genus. The photobiont (algal symbiote) is of the green algal genus Trebouxia, with cells measuring 5–8 μm in diameter.

== Habitat and distribution ==
Jamesiella chaverriae has been found growing on bark and rotting logs in lower montane cloud forests of Costa Rica, specifically in the Cordillera de Tilarán region. The type specimen was collected at Pilón Biological Station in Tenorio Volcano National Park, located 140 km (87 mi) northwest of San José and 25 km (16 mi) north-northwest of Tilarán, near Bijagua. This habitat is characterized by high humidity and persistent cloud cover. The lichen is found at an elevation of about 700 m (2,300 ft) in the lower montane cloud forest zone, particularly on exposed trees, fence posts, and wet rotting logs along pastures. The climate in this region is typically cool and moist throughout the year. In 2022, J. chaverriae was reported from the states of Mato Grosso do Sul and Santa Catarina in Brazil.
