= Natural history of Scotland =

Natural history of Scotland concerns the flora, fauna and mycota of Scotland.

== Flora ==
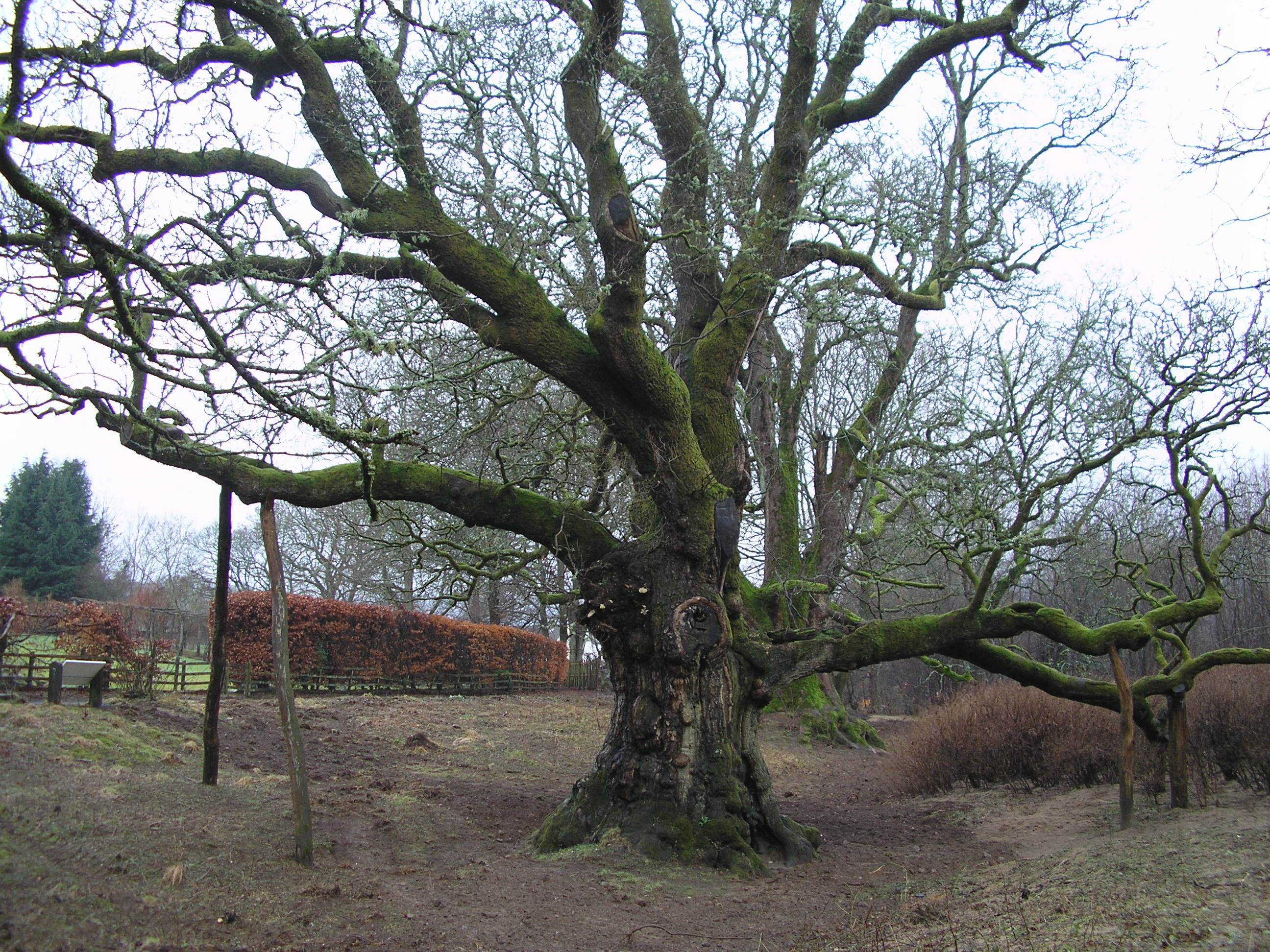
The Birnam Oak located in the Tay Valley.

The flora of Scotland is an assemblage of native plant species including over 1,600 vascular plants, more than 1,500 lichens and nearly 1,000 bryophytes. The total number of vascular species is low by world standard but lichens and bryophytes are abundant and the latter form a population of global importance. Various populations of rare fern exist, although the impact of 19th century collectors threatened the existence of several species. The flora is generally typical of the north west European part of the Palearctic realm and prominent features of the Scottish flora include boreal Caledonian forest (much reduced from its natural extent), heather moorland and coastal machair. In addition to the native varieties of vascular plants there are numerous non-native introductions, now making up over 50% of the species across the UK.

There are a variety of important trees species and specimens; a Douglas fir near Inverness is the tallest tree in the United Kingdom and the Fortingall Yew may be the oldest tree in Europe. The Shetland mouse-ear and Scottish primrose are endemic flowering plants and there are a variety of endemic mosses and lichens. Numerous references to the country's flora appear in folklore, song and poetry.

== Fauna ==
The fauna of Scotland is generally typical of the north-west European part of the Palearctic realm, although several of the country's larger mammals were hunted to extinction in historic times. Scotland's diverse temperate environments support 62 species of wild mammals, including a population of wildcats and important numbers of grey and harbour seals.

Many populations of moorland birds, including blackcock and the famous red grouse, live here, and the country has internationally significant nesting grounds for seabirds such as the northern gannet. The golden eagle has become a national icon, and white-tailed eagles and ospreys have recently re-colonised the land. The Scottish crossbill is the only endemic vertebrate species in the British Isles.

Scotland’s seas are among the most biologically productive in the world; it is estimated that the total number of Scottish marine species exceeds 40,000. Included in the country's ocean inventory are the Darwin Mounds, are an important area of cold water coral reefs discovered in 1988. Inland, nearly 400 genetically distinct populations of Atlantic Salmon live in Scottish rivers. Of the 42 species of fish found in the country's fresh waters, half have arrived by natural colonisation and half by human introduction.

Only six amphibians and four land reptiles are native to Scotland, but many species of invertebrates live here that are otherwise rare in the United Kingdom (UK). An estimated 14,000 species of insect, including rare bees and butterflies protected by conservation action plans inhabit Scotland.

== Mycota ==
Approximately 1,650 species of fungal species are found in Scotland. The rare Phelloden confluens is found in five or fewer 10 km squares.

== Lichens ==
Lichens are abundant, with 37% of European species represented in just 0.75% of the European land area. Most rock surfaces, except those in very exposed places, or that are kept constantly wet by sea or fresh water, become grown with lichens. Reindeer Moss (Cladonia rangiferina) is a common species. The trunks and branches of large trees are an important lichen habitat, Tree Lungwort being particularly conspicuous. In the past lichens were widely used for dyeing clothing.

Graphis alboscripta and Halecania rhypodiza are endemic species. The former is found in the hazel woodlands of the west coast and the latter at only two sites in the Highlands. The British ranges of 35 species are confined to the Cairngorm Mountains. These include Alectoria ochroleuca, Rinodian parasitica and Cladonia trassii. Other nationally rare species found here are Jamesiella scotica, Cladonia botrytes and Ramalina polymorpha.

== Micro-organisms ==
Syringammina fragilissima is a xenophyophore found off the coast of Scotland, near Rockall. It is the largest single-celled organism known, at up to 20 centimetres (8 in) across and was the first xenophyophore ever to be described after its discovery in 1882.

== Conservation organisations ==
Conservation of the natural environment is well developed and various organisations play an important role in the stewardship of the country's flora and fauna. Many agencies in the UK are concerned that climate change, especially its potential effects on mountain plateaus and marine life, threaten much of the flora and fauna of Scotland.

== Where to see Scottish wildlife ==
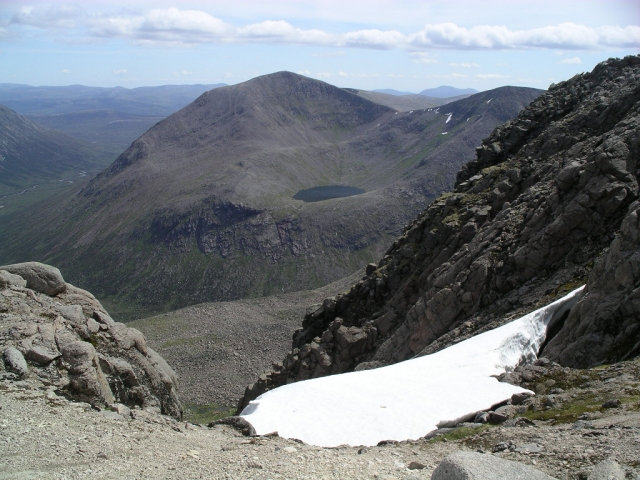
The High Cairngorms - Cairn Toul and Sgor an Lochain Uaine from Braeriach

It is possible to view whales, dolphins, porpoise, and basking sharks in their natural environment on boat tours of the Hebridean waters. Other places which exhibit Scottish wildlife include:

- Highland Wildlife Park
- Loch Lomond and the Trossachs National Park
- Cairngorms National Park
- Forestry Commission (Scotland)
- Central Scotland Forest Trust

== See also ==
- Geography of Scotland
- Geology of Scotland
