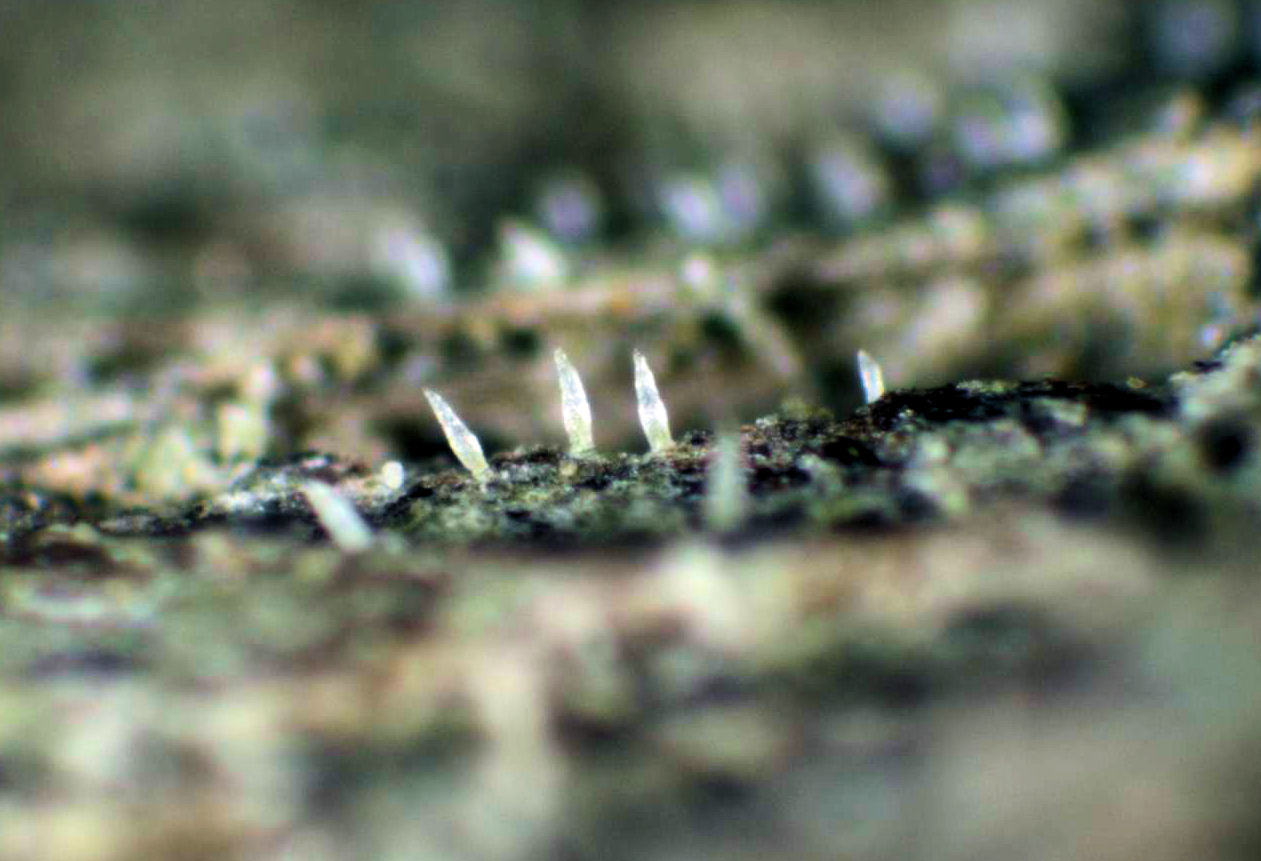
- Jamesiella anastomosans

Scientific classification
- Kingdom: Fungi
- Division: Ascomycota
- Class: Lecanoromycetes
- Order: Graphidales
- Family: Gomphillaceae
- Genus: Jamesiella; Lücking, Sérus. & Vězda (2005)

Type species
- Jamesiella anastomosans (P.James & Vězda) Lücking, Sérus. & Vězda (2005)

Species
- J. anastomosans J. chaverriae J. clavata J. dacryoidea J. elongata J. perlucida

= Jamesiella =

Genus of lichen-forming fungi

Jamesiella is a genus of lichen-forming fungi in the family Gomphillaceae. Members of Jamesiella form thin, delicate crusts on tree bark, rocks, and mosses in humid tropical and temperate forests, distributed across North and South America and Europe. The genus is distinguished from its close relative Gyalideopsis by a unique type of asexual reproductive structure called thlasidia, which are specialized stalks containing both fungal filaments and algal cells that detach and disperse as complete units capable of establishing new lichens.

== Taxonomy ==
The genus Jamesiella was introduced in 2005 by Robert Lücking, Emmanuël Sérusiaux, and Antonín Vězda during a broader revision of generic limits in the family, and was treated as a segregate of Gyalideopsis distinguished by its isidia-like hyphophores. In that treatment, the authors separated several lineages from Gyalideopsis where they considered the differences to be substantial and functionally independent. Jamesiella was established for the Gyalideopsis anastomosans group, whose defining character is a distinctive isidioid hyphophore type called "thlasidia", described as unique within the family. The genus was named in honour of the British lichenologist Peter Wilfred James, who had collected the type species.

The "thlasidia" are interpreted as modified stalked hyphophores in which the propagule-producing filaments (diahyphae) develop internally rather than being produced externally; the whole structure then detaches and functions as a dispersal unit. The type species is Jamesiella anastomosans (based on Gyalideopsis anastomosans), and the same paper made new combinations for J. perlucida and J. scotica, both originally described in Gyalideopsis.

== Description ==
Jamesiella is a genus of crustose lichens. In overall thallus form and in the structure of its fruiting bodies, it closely resembles Gyalideopsis; the main morphological distinction is in the asexual propagules. The thallus is typically thin and crust-like (often filmy), spreading over the substrate and usually smooth, only rarely becoming slightly warty. The photosynthetic partner (photobiont) is a green alga (trebouxioid).

The sexual fruiting bodies (apothecia) are round and red-brown to nearly black, and they can swell and become more translucent when wet. They have a raised margin but lack a thalline margin (one formed from the thallus). Internally, the exciple and hymenium consist of a loose network of fine hyphae set in a gel-like matrix. The asci usually contain 2–8 ascospores and have thickened tips; their contents stain wine-red in iodine (K/I+). The ascospores are colourless and range from simply cross-walled to densely muriform, often with a thin to thick outer sheath (perispore).

Jamesiella is set apart from Gyalideopsis by its distinctive hyphophores. These are isidiiform and are termed "thlasidia": modified stalked hyphophores in which the spore-bearing filaments (diahyphae, producing bead-like or thread-like conidia) develop inside the stalk rather than externally. The stalk also encloses algal cells, and the whole thlasidium breaks away and is dispersed as a single unit that can found a new thallus. In many Gyalideopsis species, by contrast, hyphophores do not incorporate algal cells in this way. No lichen substances have been detected by thin-layer chromatography in this group, and species occupy similar habitats to Gyalideopsis, occurring on bark, rock, and associated bryophytes in humid situations.

== Species ==
As of December 2025, Species Fungorum (in the Catalogue of Life) accepts four species of Jamesiella.

- Jamesiella anastomosans (P.James & Vězda) Lücking, Sérus. & Vězda (2005)
- Jamesiella chaverriae Chaves, L.Umaña & Lücking (2006)
- Jamesiella clavata Aptroot & M.Cáceres (2024) – Brazil
- Jamesiella dacryoidea Fryday (2021) – Alaska
- Jamesiella elongata Aptroot & M.Cáceres (2024) – Brazil
- Jamesiella perlucida (Vězda & Hafellner) Lücking, Sérus. & Vězda (2005)

The taxon name Jamesiella scotica, representing a species endemic to the United Kingdom and Ireland, was not published validly, because a full and direct bibliographic reference to the basionym was omitted, contrary to the nomenclatural rules.
