= Gyalideopsis wesselsii =

Scientific classification
- Kingdom: Fungi
- Division: Ascomycota
- Class: Lecanoromycetes
- Order: Graphidales
- Family: Gomphillaceae
- Genus: Gyalideopsis
- Species: G. wesselsii

Binomial name
- Gyalideopsis wesselsii Lücking, Sipman & Chaves (2006)
- Holotype: Tenorio Volcano National Park, Costa Rica

Species of lichen

Gyalideopsis wesselsii is a species of corticolous (bark-dwelling) crustose lichen in the family Gomphillaceae. The pale greenish-grey lichen forms thin, shiny crusts with a warty surface on bark and rotting logs in cloud forest environments, and is known only from two locations in Costa Rica at elevations between 100 and 700 m (330 and 2,300 ft). It can be distinguished from closely related species by its tiny, narrowly spoon-shaped reproductive structures, dark greyish-brown fruiting bodies with triangular projections when young, and by producing a single large spore per spore sac rather than two smaller spores, as in the related G. aequatoriana from Ecuador and G. subaequatoriana from Florida.

== Taxonomy ==
Gyalideopsis wesselsii was described in 2006 by the lichenologists Robert Lücking, Harrie Sipman, and José Luis Chaves. The species is named in honour of Wim Wessels, a Dutch ambassador to Costa Rica who helped secure funding for Instituto Nacional de Biodiversidad's activities from the Dutch government.

The species belongs to the genus Gyalideopsis within the family Gomphillaceae, order Graphidales. It closely resembles G. aequatoriana (described from Ecuador) in its warty thallus and tiny, narrowly spoon-shaped reproductive structures (hyphophores). However, G. aequatoriana differs in having larger, light brown fruiting bodies with pale margins, and producing two spores per spore sac rather than the single spore found in G. wesselsii. Another related species, G. palmata, found in the same localities, has differently shaped reproductive structures that are broadly flattened and dissected like the fingers of a hand.

== Description ==
Gyalideopsis wesselsii forms a thin, crustose (crust-like) thallus on bark. The thallus is continuous, measuring 10–30 mm across and only 10–20 μm thick, with a cartilaginous outer layer. Its surface is irregularly warty (verrucose) due to clusters of calcium oxalate crystals. The lichen is pale greenish-grey in colour and has a shiny (nitidous) appearance. The photosynthetic partner (photobiont) consists of green algae (trebouxioid in form) with cells measuring 5–8 μm in diameter.

The reproductive structures (apothecia) are flattened against the surface (applanate), biatorine in form (cup-like with a proper margin of fungal tissue), round, and measure 0.15–0.25 mm in diameter and 60–80 μm in height. The disc is flat and dark greyish brown. The margin is distinct, of the same colour as the disc, and when young is covered by 3–5 triangular, thin, pale grey projections (lobules).

The spore-producing layer (hymenium) is 50–60 μm high, colourless to pale sordid green. The spore sacs (asci) are broadly club-shaped, measuring 45–55 by 20–25 μm. Each ascus produces a single, ellipsoid spore that is muriform (divided by both longitudinal and transverse walls), with slight constrictions at the dividing walls. The spores measure 40–50 by 15–20 μm, are 2.5–3 times as long as broad, and are colourless.

The specialized asexual reproductive structures (hyphophores) are shortly bristle-shaped with a widened, spoon-shaped (spathulate) apex, measuring 0.06–0.08 mm high and 25–35 μm thick above the base. They are blackish brown with a pale base. The diahyphae (specialized hyphae inserted at the apex of hyphophores) are branched throughout, resembling a string of beads (moniliform), with colourless, broadly club-shaped to drop-shaped segments measuring 3–8 by 2–3 μm.

Gyalideopsis subaequatoriana is a closely related species from Florida, USA, that serves as an intermediate form between G. wesselsii and G. aequatoriana. While sharing a similar thallus appearance and apothecial morphology with G. wesselsii, it can be readily distinguished by its significantly larger hyphophores (0.2–0.3 mm tall) with fan-shaped, greyish-black apices compared to the much smaller, spoon-shaped hyphophores of G. wesselsii. Additionally, G. subaequatoriana typically produces two smaller spores (20–30 by 12–16 μm) per spore sac rather than the single, larger spores of G. wesselsii, and inhabits coastal sand pine-oak scrub ecosystems in Florida rather than the montane environments of Costa Rica.

== Habitat and distribution ==
Gyalideopsis wesselsii is currently known only from Costa Rica, where it has been collected from several locations:

- Volcán Tenorio National Park (Pilón Biological Station) in the Cordillera de Tilarán
- Hitoy Cerere Biological Reserve, in the Cordillera de Talamanca

The species inhabits lower montane cloud forest zones at elevations ranging from 100 to 700 m (330 to 2,300 ft) above sea level. It has been found growing on wet, rotting logs and on wood (fence posts) in exposed areas along pastures. These habitats suggest the species prefers humid environments at the edge of forested areas, particularly in the montane regions of Costa Rica. The species' occurrence in both the Cordillera de Tilarán and the Talamanca Ridge indicates it may be more widely distributed throughout suitable habitats in Costa Rica. G. wesselsii is one of 27 Gyalideopsis species that have been reported from Costa Rica.
