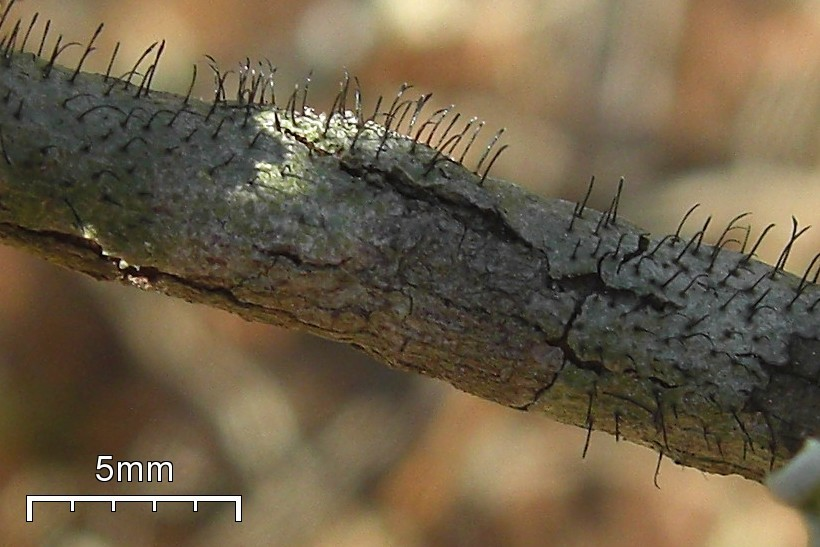

Scientific classification
- Kingdom: Fungi
- Division: Ascomycota
- Class: Lecanoromycetes
- Order: Graphidales
- Family: Gomphillaceae
- Genus: Gyalideopsis
- Species: G. buckii

Binomial name
- Gyalideopsis buckii Lücking, Sérus. & Vězda (2005)

Synonyms
- Tricharia vezdae W.R.Buck (1980)

= Gyalideopsis buckii =

Species of lichen

Gyalideopsis buckii is a species of bark-dwelling lichen in the family Gomphillaceae. It is found in the United States.

== Taxonomy ==
The lichen was originally described by botanist William Russell Buck in 1980, as Tricharia vezdae, based on specimens collected from the southeastern United States. The type specimen was collected in Natchez Trace State Park, Tennessee, where it was found growing on the branches of a shrub (possibly Vaccinium arboreum) in an area that was dry and sandy. In 2005, lichenologists Robert Lücking, Emmanuël Sérusiaux, and Antonín Vězda reorganized the systematics of the family Gomphillaceae with cladistic analysis. As part of this reorganization, Tricharia vezdae was to be transferred to the genus Gyalideopsis, but the name Gyalideopsis vezdae was already in use for another species. A new name was given to the taxon, with the specific epithet buckii honoring the original describer.

The lichen has been previously noted by Vězda as a probable member of Tricharia, but he found a sterile specimen (without ascospores or apothecial structures) and was unable to describe it as a new species without this information. Buck's original epithet for the species, vezdae, acknowledges Vězda's original work with the species.

== Description ==
The main characteristics of Gyalideopsis buckii are its growth on bark (many Gyalideopsis lichens instead grow on leaves), the few sterile hairs it has, and the distinctive structure of its hyphophores (erect stalked asexual sporophores). Its ascospores are ovoid to muriform (mouse-shaped), and measure 23–28 μm long by about 15 μm wide.
