= Tricharia variratae =

Scientific classification
- Kingdom: Fungi
- Division: Ascomycota
- Class: Lecanoromycetes
- Order: Graphidales
- Family: Gomphillaceae
- Genus: Tricharia
- Species: T. variratae

Binomial name
- Tricharia variratae Lücking & Sipman (2005)
- Type locality: Varirata National Park, New Guinea

Species of lichen-forming fungus

Tricharia variratae is a foliicolous (leaf-dwelling), crustose lichen in the family Gomphillaceae, described as a new species in 2005. The type was collected in Papua New Guinea (Central Province), Varirata National Park at 800 m elevation, from leaves in March 1987. The species appears closely related to Tricharia elegans and allied taxa, and it is very similar to Tricharia pallida, but is distinguished from that species (and other members of its genus) by its more or less umbelliform (nail-like) hyphophores.

The thallus forms a greyish-green crust 5–20 mm across that is smooth, continuous, and without crystals, and it bears abundant black setae 0.7–1.0 mm long (40–50 μm thick at the base), with the tips often paler. The apothecia are not abundant. They are sessile, strongly constricted at the base with a short, thick stipe, and are regularly rounded (0.4–0.7 mm in diameter and 0.3–0.4 mm high), with a flat, pale yellowish-brown, translucent disc and a thin margin that is not to only slightly prominent and somewhat darker. Microscopically, the exciple is hyaline and well developed (branched hyphae in a gelatinous matrix, extending down the stipe), the hypothecium is thin (10–15 μm) and hyaline, and the hymenium is hyaline (about 75 μm). The paraphyses (sterile filaments in the hymenium) are branched and interconnected, the asci are clavate (60–65 × 10–13 μm), and each ascus has 6–8 ellipsoid, somewhat muriform (multichambered) ascospores with 3–5 × 0–1 septa (15–18 × 5–7 μm). Hyphophores are abundant and setiform (0.8–1.2 mm long, 40–50 μm broad at the base), with the uppermost part expanded into a disc-like, palmate to lobate shield 0.15–0.2 mm across when moist. Unlike related species with a crown of apical hooks on the hyphophores and/or thallus setae, T. variratae has this disc-like expansion, and diahyphae (a specialized type of conidium) were not observed.
