= Echinoplaca pernambucensis =

Scientific classification
- Domain: Eukaryota
- Kingdom: Fungi
- Division: Ascomycota
- Class: Lecanoromycetes
- Order: Graphidales
- Family: Gomphillaceae
- Genus: Echinoplaca
- Species: E. pernambucensis

Binomial name
- Echinoplaca pernambucensis Øvstedal & Elix (2011)

Species of lichen

Echinoplaca pernambucensis is a species of crustose lichen in the family Gomphillaceae. It was described as new to science in 2011. It is found in the Atlantic Forest in Pernambuco, Brazil. This lichen is similar in appearance to Echinoplaca verrucifera, but lacks setae and contains gyrophoric, lecanoric, and subgyrophoric acids.

== Taxonomy ==
Echinoplaca pernambucensis was first described by lichenologists Dag Øvstedal and John Elix in 2010, following the discovery of the type specimen in Recife, Pernambuco, Brazil. The specific epithet pernambucensis is derived from the location where the type specimen was found. The genus Echinoplaca is part of the Gomphillaceae and its members are typically found growing on leaves, with only a few species known to grow on bark. The authors acknowledge, however, that without DNA analysis for confirmation, that their generic placement is tentative, and that the genera Gyalideopsis and Calenia were also reasonable possibilities.

== Description ==
The Echinoplaca pernambucensis lichen is crustose, featuring a whitish-green basal crust that is 2–3 cm wide and 100–115 μm thick. The crust is corticate in some areas, while it appears cracked and granular in others. This lichen hosts a species of Chlorococcaceae as its photobiont, with cells that measure 4–6 μm wide. It also contains abundant calcium oxalate crystals.

The upper surface of the lichen is covered with numerous conical areolae, which are pinkish-white, up to 0.2 mm high and wide, and lack algae. The areolae have a more compact texture than the basal crust and feature a central hyphophore. The hyphophores are whitish, up to 0.4 mm long, mostly curved, and 30–40 μm wide, with a slightly broader apex. No diahyphae, setae, or apothecia have been observed in this species.

The secondary chemistry of Echinoplaca pernambucensis includes gyrophoric acid as a major component, and both lecanoric acid and subgyrophoric acid as minor components.

== Habitat and distribution ==
Echinoplaca pernambucensis is found growing on the bark of tree species in the Atlantic Forest in Pernambuco, Brazil. The lichen typically grows about 1.5 m (4.9 ft) above the ground.

=== Similar species ===
The genus Echinoplaca is characterised by flush apothecia with the thallus, and often the presence of hyphophores and setae. While the absence of apothecia makes the generic placement of this species tentative, it shares several characteristics with other Echinoplaca species, such as the presence of hyphophores, calcium oxalate crystals, and the type of photobiont. Other genera in the family Gomphillaceae, such as Gyalideopsis and Calenia, also share some similarities with Echinoplaca pernambucensis, but differences in their respective features set them apart from this species.
