= Gyalideopsis pseudoactinoplaca =

Scientific classification
- Kingdom: Fungi
- Division: Ascomycota
- Class: Lecanoromycetes
- Order: Graphidales
- Family: Gomphillaceae
- Genus: Gyalideopsis
- Species: G. pseudoactinoplaca

Binomial name
- Gyalideopsis pseudoactinoplaca Lücking & Chaves (2006)
- Holotype: Tenorio Volcano National Park, Costa Rica

Species of lichen

Gyalideopsis pseudoactinoplaca is a species of corticolous (bark-dwelling) crustose lichen in the family Gomphillaceae. The pale greenish-grey lichen forms thin, slightly shiny crusts on bark and rotting logs in cloud forest environments, and is currently known only from Costa Rica's Tenorio Volcano National Park. Unlike many lichens, it has not been observed to produce typical cup-like reproductive structures (apothecia), instead reproducing through unusual spherical, stalkless specialized structures that sit directly on the surface, which researchers believe represent an evolutionary simplification of typical reproductive structures through complete reduction of supporting elements.

== Taxonomy ==
Gyalideopsis pseudoactinoplaca was described in 2006 by the lichenologists Robert Lücking and José Luis Chaves. The species epithet pseudoactinoplaca refers to the resemblance of its reproductive structures to those of Actinoplaca strigulacea, another lichen species. The type specimen was collected in Costa Rica, in the province of Alajuela, within the Cordillera de Tilarán. It was found in Tenorio Volcano National Park, part of the Arenal-Tempisque Conservation Area, at the Pilón Biological Station. The specimen was collected at an elevation of 700 m (2,300 ft) in the lower montane cloud forest zone, where it was found on wet, rotting logs in exposed areas, including trees and fence posts along pasture.

Although the species was described within the genus Gyalideopsis, its exact classification is somewhat tentative because traditional reproductive structures (apothecia) have not been observed. However, researchers placed it in Gyalideopsis based on the anatomical features of its specialized fungal filaments (diahyphae). While superficially resembling Actinoplaca strigulacea, microscopic examination reveals that the anatomy of G. pseudoactinoplaca is more consistent with other Gyalideopsis species, such as G. krogiae and G. lambinonii.

The researchers concluded that the similarity to Actinoplaca is a case of convergent evolution rather than a close relationship, with the reproductive structures of G. pseudoactinoplaca representing an evolutionary simplification of the typical Gyalideopsis-type reproductive structures through complete reduction of the stalk and other supporting elements.

== Description ==
Gyalideopsis pseudoactinoplaca forms a thin, crustose (crust-like) thallus on bark. The thallus is continuous, measuring 5–10 mm across and only 10–20 μm thick, with a cartilaginous outer layer. Unlike some related species, its surface is smooth and lacks calcium oxalate crystals. The lichen is pale greenish grey in colour and has a slightly shiny appearance. Like all lichens, G. pseudoactinoplaca is a symbiotic association between a fungus and an alga. The photosynthetic partner (photobiont) belongs to a green algal group called trebouxioid algae, with cells measuring 5–8 μm in diameter.

The species has not been observed to produce the typical cup-like reproductive structures (apothecia) found in many lichens. Instead, it reproduces through specialized structures called hyphophores, which are unusual in this species. The hyphophores are isidioid (resembling small finger-like outgrowths), roughly spherical (globose), and sit directly on the thallus surface without a stalk (sessile). They represent a densely packed bundle of specialized fungal filaments (diahyphae) without supporting structures. These hyphophores measure 0.03–0.05 mm in diameter, are pale greenish white and slightly translucent, and show a constriction at their base.

Under the microscope, the diahyphae form a densely packed sphere, are branched throughout, and have a beaded appearance (moniliform). The individual segments are rounded to almost equal in width and length in the inner parts, measuring 3–5 by 3–4 μm, colourless, and interspersed with scattered algal cells, especially at the base.

== Habitat and distribution ==
Gyalideopsis pseudoactinoplaca is known only from Costa Rica, specifically from the Volcán Tenorio National Park (Pilón Biological Station) in the Cordillera de Tilarán. The species inhabits the lower montane cloud forest zone at an elevation of approximately 700 m (2,300 ft) above sea level.

The lichen has been found growing on wet, rotting logs in exposed areas along pastures, suggesting it may prefer high-humidity microhabitats at the edge of forests. As this species is known only from its type locality, its complete geographic distribution remains uncertain. G. pseudoactinoplaca is one of 27 Gyalideopsis species that have been reported from Costa Rica.
