= Gyalideopsis puertoricensis =

Scientific classification
- Kingdom: Fungi
- Division: Ascomycota
- Class: Lecanoromycetes
- Order: Graphidales
- Family: Gomphillaceae
- Genus: Gyalideopsis
- Species: G. puertoricensis

Binomial name
- Gyalideopsis puertoricensis Sipman & Lücking (2005)

Species of lichen

Gyalideopsis puertoricensis is a species of corticolous (bark-dwelling) crustose lichen in the family Gomphillaceae. Found in Puerto Rico, it was formally described as a new species in 2005 by Harrie Sipman and Robert Lücking.
