= Gyalideopsis lunata =

Scientific classification
- Kingdom: Fungi
- Division: Ascomycota
- Class: Lecanoromycetes
- Order: Graphidales
- Family: Gomphillaceae
- Genus: Gyalideopsis
- Species: G. lunata

Binomial name
- Gyalideopsis lunata H.Harada (2011)

Species of lichen-forming fungus

Gyalideopsis lunata is a species of saxicolous (rock-dwelling) crustose lichen in the family Gomphillaceae. Found in Japan, it was described as a new species by Hiroshi Harada in 2011. The holotype was found growing on rock in Gifu Prefecture. The holotype specimen is housed in the lichen herbarium of the Natural History Museum and Institute, Chiba. The Japanese name for the lichen is ヒゲナシヒゲゴケ ('beardless beard lichen').
