= Tricharia duotela =

Scientific classification
- Domain: Eukaryota
- Kingdom: Fungi
- Division: Ascomycota
- Class: Lecanoromycetes
- Order: Graphidales
- Family: Gomphillaceae
- Genus: Tricharia
- Species: T. duotela

Binomial name
- Tricharia duotela W.B.Sanders & Lücking (2015)

Species of lichen

Tricharia duotela is a species of foliicolous (leaf-dwelling) lichen in the family Gomphillaceae. It is characterized by its pale greenish-grey to white color, small ascospores, and preference for open habitats. Found in South Florida, it can be found on the leaves of saw palmetto in pine barrens. This lichen is similar to other species in the genus Tricharia, but it is differentiated by its smaller ascospores and unique diahyphae.

== Taxonomy ==
Tricharia duotela was formally described by lichenologists William Sanders and Robert Lücking. The species was discovered by the first author in Lee County, Florida, at the Florida Gulf Coast University campus on May 31, 2014. The holotype specimen was found on the leaf blade of a Serenoa repens plant. The species epithet duotela comes from the Latin word telum ("weapon"), referring to the morphologically distinct sterile setae and hyphophores of the lichen.

== Description ==
The Tricharia duotela lichen has a thallus that is continuous to dispersed, with areolae measuring 1–3 mm across and 20–30 μm thick. It is pale greenish-grey to white in color and has a cartilaginous, corticiform layer. This species is distinguishable from other similar species, such as Tricharia aulaxinoides, by its smaller ascospores that are mostly transversely septate. The diahyphae in Tricharia duotela are filiform, with four branches originating from a central point in a tetrahedral orientation. Tricharia cuneata, found in Florida, Mexico, and Argentina, has a smooth thallus without crystals, lecideine apothecia, and longer, consistently submuriform ascospores.

== Habitat and distribution ==
Tricharia duotela is found in the United States, specifically in Florida. It grows on the leaves of saw palmetto (Serenoa repens) in pine barrens. Unlike other similar species in the Tricharia, it prefers more open habitats. Lichens possessing well-developed thalli with apothecia are commonly found in these environments, while lichens with smaller, infertile thalli are occasionally seen in hammocks. T. duotela has been recorded in Lee and Collier counties in Florida.
