= Echinoplaca basalis =

Scientific classification
- Kingdom: Fungi
- Division: Ascomycota
- Class: Lecanoromycetes
- Order: Graphidales
- Family: Gomphillaceae
- Genus: Echinoplaca
- Species: E. basalis

Binomial name
- Echinoplaca basalis W.B.Sanders & Lücking (2015)

Species of lichen

Echinoplaca basalis is a species of foliicolous (leaf-dwelling) lichen in the family Gomphillaceae. It is found in the Southeastern United States.

== Taxonomy ==
Echinoplaca basalis was formally described by William Sanders and Robert Lücking in 2015. The species name basalis refers to the position of the diahyphal mass at the base of a hyaline, setose hyphophore. The type specimen was collected in Lee County, Florida, on the leaf blade of a Sabal palmetto at the Florida Gulf Coast University campus.

The species was formally described even in the absence of apothecia due to its abundance and distinctive diahyphal masses. Placement in the genus Echinoplaca is supported by the presence of thin white setae /hyphophore scales and the structure of the diahyphae. The compact propagules of Echinoplaca basalis disperse both bionts together, a feature shared with other species in the Gomphillaceae such as Actinoplaca strigulacea, Gyalideopsis vulgaris, and Gyalideopsis sessile.

== Description ==
The thallus of Echinoplaca basalis is continuous but marginally dispersed or deeply lobed, measuring 2–5 mm across and 15–25 μm thick. Its surface is verrucose and green in colour due to the presence of calcium oxalate crystals. White setae are also found on the thallus. The photobiont of this lichen is chlorococcoid (green algae), with cells 5–9 μm in diameter. Although apothecia have not been observed in this species, it has distinctive diahyphal masses at the base of the hyaline, setose hyphophore.

== Habitat and distribution ==
Echinoplaca basalis is primarily found in Lee County, Florida, in the United States. It grows on the leaf blades of Sabal palmetto in live oak hammocks near nature trails and picnic areas.
