= Gyalideopsis lambinonii =

Scientific classification
- Kingdom: Fungi
- Division: Ascomycota
- Class: Lecanoromycetes
- Order: Graphidales
- Family: Gomphillaceae
- Genus: Gyalideopsis
- Species: G. lambinonii

Binomial name
- Gyalideopsis lambinonii Vězda (1979)

Species of lichen-forming fungus

Gyalideopsis lambinonii is a species of corticolous (bark-dwelling) crustose lichen in the family Gomphillaceae. It forms a thin, grey-whitish crust on tree bark in high-elevation tropical forests and is characterised by distinctive umbrella-shaped dispersal structures, each consisting of a stalk supporting a dark, shield-like head up to 1 mm wide. Originally described in 1979 from montane forests in central Africa, the species has since been recorded from various tropical and subtropical regions including South America, Central America, Asia, and Florida. The lichen was named in honour of the Belgian botanist Jacques Lambinon, who collected the type specimen on Mount Kahuzi in what is now the Democratic Republic of the Congo.

== Taxonomy ==
Gyalideopsis lambinonii was described as a species new to science in 1979 by the Czech lichenologist Antonín Vězda, in his monographic study of the family Asterothyriaceae. He placed it in the genus Gyalideopsis, which he treated within Asterothyriaceae alongside genera such as Tricharia, based on shared features of the apothecial anatomy, non-amyloid asci and the presence of specialised hyphophores.

The type material of Gyalideopsis lambinonii was collected by Jacques Lambinon on Kahuzi in Kivu Province (then Zaire). The holotype was gathered at 2,640 m on the bark of Agauria salicifolia; additional cited material includes a collection from 2,990 m on bamboo from the same mountain and a Rwandan specimen from the Forêt de Rugege. Vězda explicitly dedicated the species to Lambinon. A later review of taxa named after Lambinon describes Gyalideopsis lambinonii as a "remarkable" gomphillaceous lichen with umbrella-shaped hyphophores and confirms that the type series was collected during Lambinon's Albertine Rift fieldwork in 1971–72. Subsequent authors have placed Gyalideopsis in the family Gomphillaceae, and G. lambinonii is now routinely treated as a member of that family.

== Description ==
Gyalideopsis lambinonii forms a thin, continuous bark-inhabiting thallus that is grey-whitish, smooth and somewhat glossy. It lacks a distinct prothallus and has a cartilaginous, hyaline (translucent) cortex. The photobiont layer is 25–35 μm thick, composed of roughly spherical to broadly ellipsoid algal cells about 8–10 μm in diameter. The thallus margin is lobulate to crenulate, and numerous hyphophores occur across the surface.

The hyphophores are distinctive: each consists of a short, relatively thick central stalk that supports a black, round, shield-like head 0.8–1 mm wide. In dry material, the shield margin is slightly incurved towards the thallus, while the centre is conspicuously depressed. From the transition zone between stalk and shield arise many hyaline hyphae, 5–6 μm thick, that branch into short stalks, each bearing a spherical hyphal tuft 50–70 μm across. These tufts comprise the diaspores; their hyphae, when rehydrated, separate into 30 μm-long, multicelled, strongly constricted elements, giving a beaded or "string-of-pearls" appearance.

Apothecia are infrequent. They are broadly adnate, 0.8–1 mm wide and 0.15–0.2 mm tall, remaining flat throughout development. Young apothecia may show a slightly raised, blue-white or very dark margin, but the margin soon becomes indistinct. The disc is dark brown to almost black, smooth, and in moist conditions becomes faintly translucent. The lateral excipulum (20–30 μm thick) is hyaline, shading to brown near the surface; the basal excipulum forms a hyaline ring 30–50 μm tall. The hypothecium is 10–15 μm thick and colourless. The hymenium reaches 80–90 μm in height, with an olivaceous epithecial zone; below this the tissue is hyaline. Paraphyses are dense, richly branched and anastomosing, with internal cavities (lumina) 0.5–0.8 μm wide. Asci are clavate, narrowing into a long stalk, and contain a single spore.

The ascospores are ellipsoid, straight, and conspicuously muriform, measuring 40–60 × 20–30 μm. They possess numerous transverse septa and additional longitudinal septa, and are strongly constricted at the septa.

== Habitat and distribution ==
Gyalideopsis lambinonii was originally described from high-elevation tropical forests in central Africa. It was collected on the bark of an Agauria tree at 2,640 m elevation on Kahuzi, in Kivu Province of Zaire, with a second collection from the same mountain at 2,990 m on a bamboo culm.

Additional material has been recorded from the Forêt de Rugege in Rwanda, where the species was found at 2,350 m on the trunk of Hagenia abyssinica along the road between Butare and Cyangugu. All reported African collections are corticolous or lignicolous on woody hosts or bamboo in montane forest between about 2,350 and 2,990 m. Other collections of the lichen have been reported from Bolivia, Brazil, Venezuela, Costa Rica, Taiwan, Thailand, Vietnam, and Florida.
