= Gyalidea goughensis =

Scientific classification
- Domain: Eukaryota
- Kingdom: Fungi
- Division: Ascomycota
- Class: Lecanoromycetes
- Order: Graphidales
- Family: Gomphillaceae
- Genus: Gyalidea
- Species: G. goughensis

Binomial name
- Gyalidea goughensis Øvstedal (2010)

Species of lichen

Gyalidea goughensis is a species of crustose lichen in the family Gomphillaceae. Found in the Tristan da Cunha–Gough Island, it was described as a new species in 2010 by Norwegian lichenologist Dag Øvstedal. The type specimen was collected from the inland of The Admirals (a small satellite island east of Gough Island). Here it was found growing on the stem of an Island Cape myrtle (Phylica arborea) tree at an altitude of 100 m (330 ft). The species is known only from the type locality.

The lichen has a thin, green-grey crust-like thallus that grows in bark fissures. Its ascospores, which number eight per ascus, are 3-septate and measure about 10 by 2.5 μm. No secondary chemicals were detected using thin-layer chromatography.
