= Ocellularia kansriae =

Scientific classification
- Domain: Eukaryota
- Kingdom: Fungi
- Division: Ascomycota
- Class: Lecanoromycetes
- Order: Graphidales
- Family: Graphidaceae
- Genus: Ocellularia
- Species: O. kansriae

Binomial name
- Ocellularia kansriae Homchant. & Coppins (2002)

Species of lichen

Ocellularia kansriae is a species of corticolous (bark-dwelling) lichen in the family Graphidaceae. Found in Northern and Eastern Thailand, it was formally described as a new species in 2002 by lichenologists Natsurang Homchantara and Brian J. Coppins. The type specimen was collected from Phu Hin Rong Kla National Park (Phetchabun Province) at an altitude of 1,475 m (4,839 ft); here, in an evergreen forest, it was found growing on the bark of Syzygium. The lichen has a shiny, olivaceous-grey thallus with a texture ranging from smooth to finely verruculose (warted). It contains protocetraric acid, a secondary compound. The specific epithet kansriae honours Thai lichenologist Kansri Boonpragob, a colleague who collected specimens from Khao Yai National Park in Eastern Thailand.
