= Echinoplaca schizidiifera =

Scientific classification
- Kingdom: Fungi
- Division: Ascomycota
- Class: Lecanoromycetes
- Order: Graphidales
- Family: Gomphillaceae
- Genus: Echinoplaca
- Species: E. schizidiifera

Binomial name
- Echinoplaca schizidiifera J.E.Hern. & Lücking (2011)

Species of lichen

Echinoplaca schizidiifera is a species of lichen in the family Gomphillaceae. Described in 2011 from specimens collected in El Ávila National Park near Caracas, Venezuela, this lichen is notable for its unique method of reproduction. Instead of producing sexual spores, it breaks apart into small flakes that detach and spread to new locations, a trait unknown in other members of its genus. The species grows on the leaves of Clusia trees in misty cloud forests at about 2,000 metres elevation and is known only from Venezuela.

== Taxonomy ==
Echinoplaca schizidiifera was formally described in 2011 by Jesús Ernesto Hernández and Robert Lücking from material collected in the cloud forested-slopes of El Ávila National Park above Caracas, Venezuela. The species belongs to the family Gomphillaceae, a group of mainly tropical, leaf- and bark-dwelling lichens noted for their minute fruit-bodies and often elaborate vegetative propagules. Its specific epithet, schizidiifera, highlights the lichen's most distinctive trait: the thallus breaks up into irregular flakes called schizidia that act as dispersal units. Such schizidial reproduction is unknown in other members of Echinoplaca and rare within the family as a whole, prompting the authors to regard E. schizidiifera as morphologically isolated within the genus while retaining it there provisionally until broader phylogenetic work is completed.

== Description ==
The lichen grows on living leaves (foliicolous) and forms thin, pale-green to whitish patches up to 5 cm across and 20–30 μm thick. A cartilaginous, skin-like surface layer becomes roughened by clusters of calcium oxalate crystals, giving the thallus a very uneven, sometimes warty appearance. Scattered, bristle-like setae 0.2–0.3 mm long are present, especially near the margins.

Towards the centre the thallus disintegrates along irregular cracks into angular flakes 0.3–0.5 mm wide; these schizidia share the internal structure of the parent thallus and eventually curl up and detach, leaving neat round scars. No apothecia (sexual fruiting bodies) or pycnidia have been seen, and the sterile setae may represent senescent hyphophores (spore-bearing pegs) that have lost their filamentous tips. Chemical spot tests and thin-layer chromatography reveal no lichen substances.

== Habitat and distribution ==
Echinoplaca schizidiifera is known only from its type locality on the coastal Cordillera de la Costa, where it colonises the leathery leaves of Clusia trees in upper montane cloud forest at about 2,000 m elevation. The site experiences persistent humidity, frequent mist and filtered light beneath a 20–25 m evergreen canopy with occasional emergent trees to 40 m. The species has not yet been reported outside Venezuela.
