= Jamesiella dacryoidea =

Scientific classification
- Domain: Eukaryota
- Kingdom: Fungi
- Division: Ascomycota
- Class: Lecanoromycetes
- Order: Graphidales
- Family: Gomphillaceae
- Genus: Jamesiella
- Species: J. dacryoidea

Binomial name
- Jamesiella dacryoidea Fryday (2021)

Species of lichen

Jamesiella dacryoidea is a thin, translucent grey-colored, teardrop-shaped lichen species that is differentiated from other species of Jamesiella by its color and shape. This lichen grows on rocks near bodies of saltwater, typically on top of bryophytes. Jamesiella dacryoidea is found on the southeast coast of Alaska and was discovered in Petersburg Borough, Alaska. This species is named after its teardrop shape, as dacryoideus in Latin means tear-shaped.

== Description ==
Jamesiella dacryoidea has a broad, flat body with a pointed or rounded tip and transparent, grey-green, and then brown coloration. The hyphae of this lichen are located in parallel with the meristem. This lichen also contains photosynthetic green algae within the thallus and between the hyphae.
