= Jacques Lambinon =

Belgian botanist and lichenologist (1936–2015)

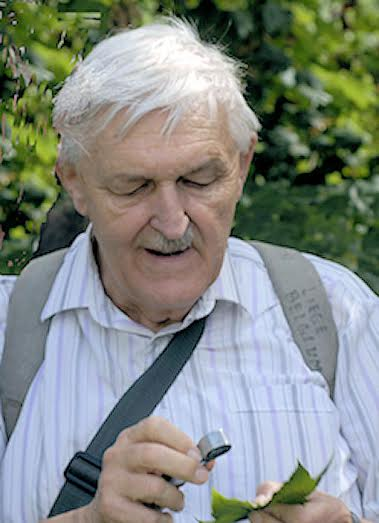
- Born: 28 September 1936; Namur, Belgium
- Died: 14 November 2015 (aged 79); Liège, Belgium
- Education: Facultés universitaires Notre-Dame de la Paix; Université catholique de Louvain
- Known for: Nouvelle Flore de la Belgique, du Grand-Duché de Luxembourg, du Nord de la France et des Régions voisines; studies on lichens, lichenicolous fungi and plant galls; floristic work in Belgium, Luxembourg and Central Africa
- Awards: Prix François Crépin (1961); Prix Agathon De Potter (1976); Prix Van Rompaey (1985)
- Scientific career
- Fields: Botany; Lichenology
- Workplaces: University of Liège
- Author abbrev. (botany): Lambinon

Jacques Ernest Joseph Lambinon (28 September 1936 – 14 November 2015) was a Belgian botanist and lichenologist who served as professor of plant systematics and geography at the University of Liège and as a member of the Royal Academy of Belgium, serving as its president in 1999. He was the principal driving force behind successive editions of the Nouvelle Flore de la Belgique, du Grand-Duché de Luxembourg, du Nord de la France et des Régions voisines, which became the standard identification flora for vascular plants in Belgium, Luxembourg, northern France and neighbouring areas. His research also extended to lichens and lichenicolous fungi in Western Europe, the floristics of Luxembourg, and the flora of regions such as Central Africa and the Mediterranean basin. A wide range of vascular plants, bryophytes, fungi and even a cyanobacterium have been named in his honour, including the lichenicolous genus Lambinonia.

== Life and academic career ==
Born in Namur on 28 September 1936, Lambinon was the son of Alphonse Lambinon, a travelling salesman for a tobacco manufacturer, and Léona Radelet. After a classical education at the Athénée royal de Namur, he studied biological sciences at the Facultés universitaires Notre-Dame de la Paix in Namur (1953–1955), then completed a degree in botanical sciences at the Université catholique de Louvain (1955–1957) under the botanist Pierre Martens, obtaining a secondary-school teaching qualification in the same year. He was then taken on as a trainee at the State Botanical Garden of Brussels in the team working on the flora of Central Africa, where he attracted the attention of Fredi Darimont, who secured a scholarship for him from the University of Liège and arranged his appointment as assistant there in 1959. From the outset his publications covered a broad spectrum of groups – vascular plants, bryophytes, lichens and fungi – and dealt with both the European and Central African floras, as well as with non-native species. He defended his doctoral thesis at Liège in 1966, a taxonomic and phytogeographical revision of the macrolichens of Belgium and neighbouring regions, which formed the basis of his later book Les Lichens (1969).

Over the following decades he taught and carried out research in systematic botany and phytogeography at Liège, where he helped build up an important herbarium and literature collection. After the accidental death of Darimont in 1966, Lambinon took over the course in cryptogamy at Liège, and in the following year also inherited the courses in phytogeography and plant systematics after the retirement of Raymond Bouillenne and Armand Monoyer. He rose through the academic ranks to become a full professor in 1973 and was entrusted with the new chair of plant systematics and geography. That year he moved with his group into the newly constructed Institute of Botany on the Sart Tilman campus, where he assembled a team of specialists in different plant and fungal groups, including Paul Auquier (grasses), René Schumacker (lichens and bryophytes), Vincent Demoulin (fungi and algae) and Emmanuël Sérusiaux (lichens). His laboratory became a focal point for lichenological and floristic work in the region, regularly welcoming visiting researchers such as the Luxembourg lichenologist Paul Diederich, who made intensive use of the herbarium material and library in preparing his own thesis and later publications. Lambinon became an emeritus professor in 2001, which allowed him to concentrate on the later editions of the Nouvelle Flore and to return to his long-standing interest in plant galls. Lambinon was described by his collaborators as a generous mentor whose detailed comments, corrections and practical advice substantially improved numerous manuscripts and floristic projects in Belgium and Luxembourg. Fabri also records Lambinon's involvement in wider institutional debates. In 1973 he opposed the transfer of the National Botanic Garden of Belgium from central Brussels to Meise, and several decades later he again intervened against proposals to regionalise the institution, arguing for its continued role as a federal scientific centre.

== Vascular-flora work and the Nouvelle Flore ==
In 1967 Lambinon joined Joseph-Edgard De Langhe, Léon Delvosalle, Jacques Duvigneaud, André Lawalrée, Constant Vanden Berghen and William Mullenders as one of the authors of the Flore de la Belgique, du Nord de la France et des Régions voisines, the first modern field flora of the region to appear since the work of Jules Goffart. Six years later, largely the same team published the Nouvelle Flore de la Belgique, du Grand-Duché de Luxembourg, du Nord de la France et des Régions voisines, with the National Botanic Garden of Belgium as publisher. This work, whose subsequent editions appeared in both French and Dutch, rapidly became the standard identification manual for professional and amateur botanists in the area.

Although the Nouvelle Flore was initially a collective project, Lambinon increasingly became its leading architect. He was the principal author of the detailed articles, published in journals such as Lejeunia and Dumortiera, that documented nomenclatural, taxonomic and distributional changes between successive editions. From the fourth French edition (1992) he was listed as first author, and by the fifth edition only Delvosalle and Duvigneaud remained from the original team. The sixth edition, prepared with Filip Verloove and published in 2012, was the last in which he participated; by then he was the sole surviving member of the original author group.

A large part of this work was underpinned by an elaborate index card system in which Lambinon recorded every proposed modification – taxonomic, nomenclatural or chorological – for the flora. Over the decades he accumulated around two thousand such entries, each carefully justified on its card. This documentation, along with other archives relating to the Belgian flora, was later donated to the herbarium and archives of Meise Botanic Garden.

== Lichens and lichenicolous fungi ==
Lambinon's doctoral research on macrolichens of Belgium and neighbouring countries led to the publication of Les Lichens (1969), a compact handbook that combined an introduction to lichenology with identification keys for the major macrolichen species of Belgium and adjacent regions. The book played a formative role for a generation of lichenologists in the region; for example, Paul Diederich later recalled that he first became interested in lichens at the age of sixteen through Lambinon's volume.

During the 1960s Lambinon gathered lichen records in Luxembourg and Belgium, and his herbarium collections and field notes later formed a key resource for regional lichen studies. Together with Diederich and Sérusiaux he co-authored Les macrolichens de Belgique, du Luxembourg et du nord de la France. Clés de détermination (2004), which provided updated keys to macrolichens for the same territory, building on his earlier work. Diederich and Sérusiaux's annotated checklist of the lichens and lichenicolous fungi of Belgium and Luxembourg (2000) was explicitly dedicated to Lambinon, acknowledging both his scientific contributions and his role as an inspiring guide and supporter of their work.

== Collaboration with Luxembourg naturalists and work on plant galls ==
Lambinon maintained close links with Luxembourg naturalists over several decades. He valued the detailed floristic knowledge of botanists such as Léopold Reichling, who contributed extensively to early editions of the Nouvelle Flore. For later editions he collaborated with Thierry Helminger on the difficult genus Rubus, and he systematically incorporated chorological data assembled by Luxembourg botanists into the flora. Lambinon also corresponded with members of the Société des naturalistes luxembourgeois on diverse taxonomic and nomenclatural problems, and gave a well-received lecture on the origin and history of the Alpine flora at the society's 75th-anniversary meeting in 1965.

He formally joined the Luxembourg society in 2001 and took part in its excursions, where he was sought after for his explanations of species' distributions and status. In addition to his botanical work, Lambinon had a long-standing interest in plant galls (cecidia). After an early note on galls collected in Luxembourg in 1956, he continued to gather cecidia throughout the territory of the Nouvelle Flore and envisaged a comprehensive catalogue for that area. From 1999 he collaborated with Nico Schneider and other naturalists on a series of inventories of galls and gall-inducing arthropods in Luxembourg, with contributions dealing successively with acariform mites, dipterans, hymenopterans, hemipterans and additional insect groups. Their joint papers, published between 2001 and 2012 in the bulletin of the Luxembourg naturalists' society (Bulletin de la Société des naturalistes luxembourgeois), are described by Schneider as the product of an enthusiastic and meticulous partnership. Fabri notes that his interest in galls dated back to the 1960s, and that after his retirement he returned to the subject in depth, devoting his final scientific paper to cecidology in Belgium.

== Fieldwork and international collections ==
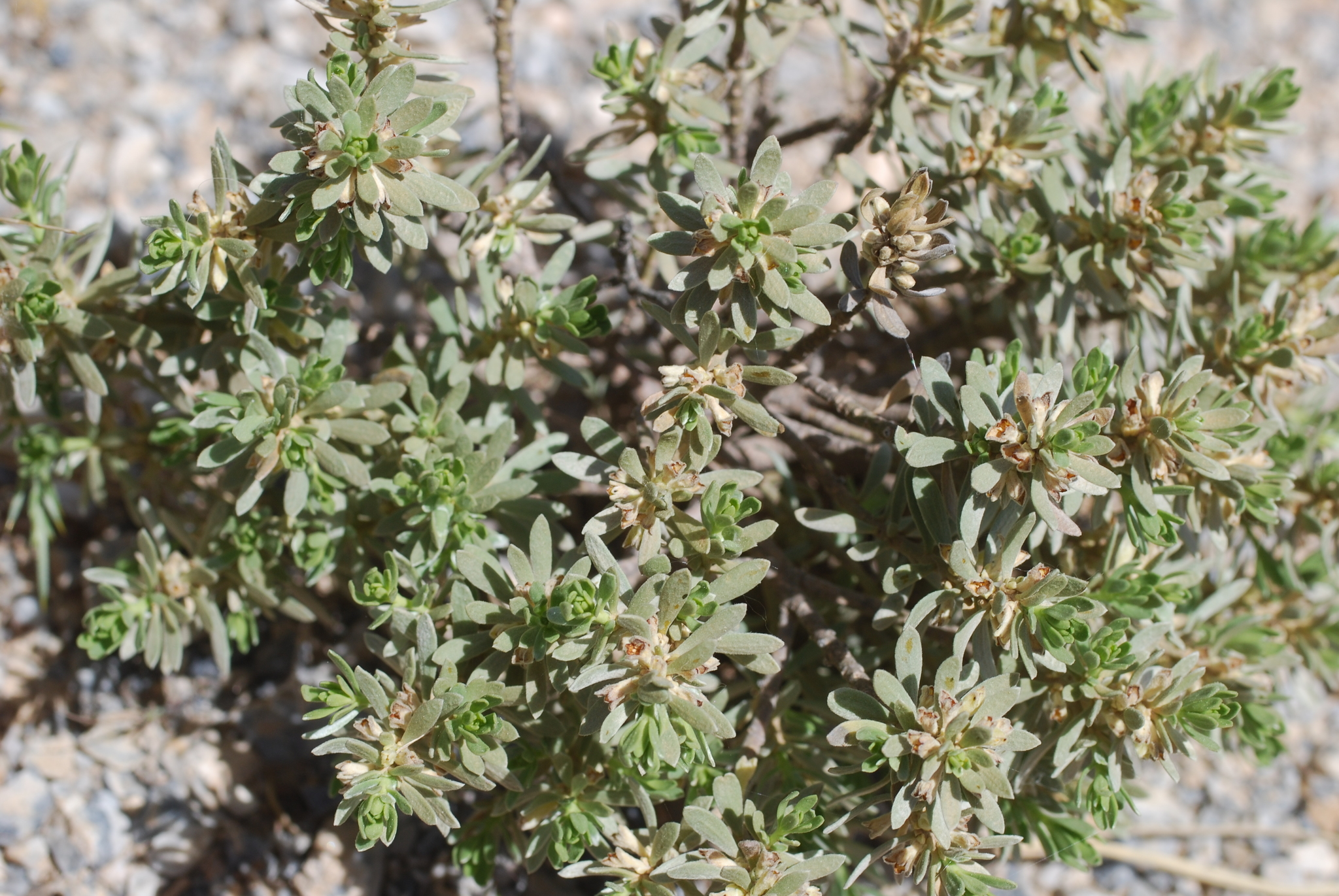
Thymelaea tartonraira subsp. austroiberica in Andalusia, one of the Mediterranean taxa described by Lambinon

Although Lambinon is most closely associated with the flora of Belgium and surrounding countries, his floristic activity was not confined to Western Europe. Martin and Sérusiaux record expeditions and collecting campaigns in Corsica, across the Mediterranean basin, in Iran, in the Albertine Rift (eastern Democratic Republic of the Congo, Burundi and Rwanda) and in Papua New Guinea. These collections, many of them deposited in the herbarium of the University of Liège (LG), formed the basis for several new species descriptions and provided valuable material for specialists working on difficult taxonomic groups such as grasses, orchids, and lichens. Fabri provides a detailed list of his collecting journeys, which ranged across the Mediterranean basin (including France, Spain and the Balearic Islands, Italy, Cyprus, Algeria and Morocco), central Europe (Germany, Switzerland, Czechoslovakia, Poland and Bulgaria), South Africa and Iran, as well as projects supported by the Fonds de la recherche fondamentale collective in Rwanda, Burundi, Zaïre (Democratic Republic of the Congo), Kenya, New Guinea and Australia. On many of these trips he combined herbarium collecting with teaching courses and field excursions for students and professional or amateur botanists from Belgium, Luxembourg and neighbouring countries.

Through his role in the Société pour l'Échange des Plantes Vasculaires de l'Europe et du Bassin Méditerranéen, Lambinon also influenced floristic research well beyond Belgium. After the death of Paul Auquier in 1981 he took over the demanding secretariat, overseeing the checking, annotating, editing and distribution of its exsiccata series. The long term exsiccata project started already in 1911 with finally nearly 20,000 numbered exsiccata items in at least 30 duplicate specimens exchanged among numerous European institutions. The series ended and bulletin ceased publication in 2001.

== Eponymy ==
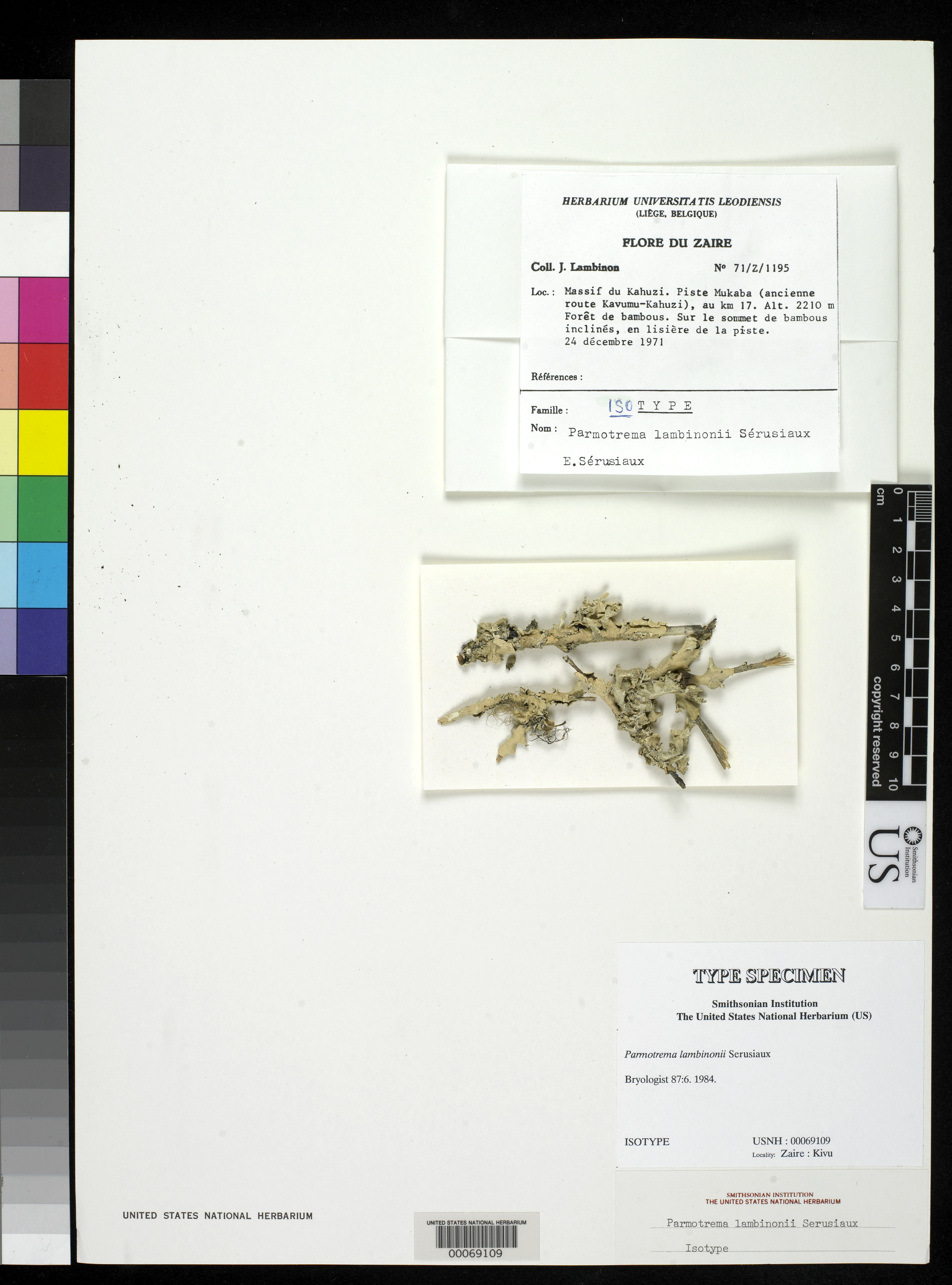
Herbarium specimen of the lichen Parmotrema lambinonii, named in Lambinon's honour

The diversity of taxa named in honour of Lambinon reflects both his wide-ranging interests and his role as collector of important type material. Martin and Sérusiaux list seventeen taxa that bear his name: five phanerogams, one pteridophyte, two bryophytes, eight fungi (including three lichenised species) and one cyanobacterium. Many of these were described from specimens that he had collected during his fieldwork and deposited at Liège, with isotypes (duplicates) placed in other herbaria.

Among vascular plants named after him are the fern Asplenium lambinonii from equatorial forest in Kivu (Democratic Republic of the Congo), the Corsican endemic Limonium lambinonii, the Pyrenean grass Festuca lambinonii, and the alpine dandelion Taraxacum lambinonii. His work on African orchids and tropical floras is recalled in Eulophia lambinoniana from Haut-Katanga and in Astragalus lambinonii from Iran. In bryology, the liverwort species Leptoscyphus lambinonii was named for him from a Costa Rican cloud forest.

Several lichens and lichenicolous fungi also commemorate his contributions: Fellhanera lambinonii, Gyalideopsis lambinonii, Parmotrema lambinonii, Peltigera lambinonii (later placed in synonymy with P. sorediifera), Pertusaria lambinonii, Plectocarpon lambinonii and Opegrapha lambinonii were all described from material that he collected in tropical Africa. The lichenicolous hyphomycete genus Lambinonia, whose single species parasitises leaf-dwelling Strigula lichens, was erected by Sérusiaux and Diederich in 2005 specifically to honour him as their mentor at Liège.

== Personal life ==
In 1963 Lambinon married his childhood friend Clémence Adam, a social worker who founded the night shelter of Liège, the local Resto du cœur and the AIDS-support association Sida Sol, and who was later made an honorary citizen of Liège for her social work. The couple had two children who, like their mother, pursued careers in the social sector: Philippe, a secondary-school teacher in the human sciences, and Sylvie, a social worker with further training in labour and development studies who became director of the Régies de quartier in Charleroi. Through his role in the Royal Academy, Lambinon and his wife represented the scientific and voluntary sectors at the engagement celebrations of Prince Philippe and Mathilde, and later attended their wedding when he was serving as president of the Academy.

== Legacy ==
Obituaries by colleagues in Belgium and Luxembourg depict Lambinon as a meticulous taxonomist with a wide view of botany, whose organisational skills and persistence ensured that the Nouvelle Flore remained up to date over several decades, and whose card index and herbarium annotations now form an important resource for future floristic work. In Luxembourg he is remembered for his readiness to answer queries, for his detailed corrections of manuscripts, and for his openness towards amateur naturalists as partners in scientific work. Fabri underlines the breadth of Lambinon's service roles. He acted as editorial secretary of Lejeunia and sat on the editorial boards of the Bulletin de la Société royale de botanique de Belgique, Natura Mosana, Cryptogamie: bryologie, lichénologie and Med-Checklist, where his sharp eye for typographical, nomenclatural and taxonomic errors was widely recognised. He was active in a wide range of scientific societies and committees, including the Société botanique de Liège, the Société des naturalistes de Namur–Luxembourg, the Conseil scientifique des sites du Sart Tilman, the Belgian scientific committee for the Washington Convention (CITES), the Conseil supérieur wallon de la Conservation de la nature, the National Committee for Biological Sciences and the scientific council of the Conservatoire botanique national de Bailleul.

According to Fabri, Lambinon remained a traditionalist in taxonomy, refusing to adopt the Angiosperm Phylogeny Group (APG) classification in his flora or herbarium, and was cautious towards new information technologies, relying on his wife for word processing. She portrays him as a meticulous and hard-working botanist who was always ready to check manuscripts, identify specimens and accompany amateur naturalists in the field, but who also held firm views on issues such as species introductions and reintroductions, and could react with marked vehemence when he felt scientific or conservation principles were at stake. The numerous taxa that bear his name, spanning vascular plants, bryophytes, fungi and cyanobacteria, are regarded by Martin and Sérusiaux as a lasting tribute to a botanist whose collecting and taxonomic expertise supported specialists across many fields. An obituary in the Liège-based journal Natura Mosana by Régine Fabri and Vincent Demoulin described Lambinon as "a pillar of botany in Belgium". Among his distinctions, Fabri lists the François Crépin Prize of the Société royale de botanique de Belgique (1961), the Agathon De Potter Prize of the Royal Academy of Belgium for plant biology (1976), and, together with his co-authors of the Nouvelle Flore, the Van Rompaey Prize awarded by the National Botanic Garden of Belgium in 1985. In the same memorial volume of Natura Mosana, the British botanist Vernon Heywood contributed a brief bilingual tribute that situates Lambinon's career in a wider European context and underlines his reputation as a meticulous field taxonomist and an influential architect of modern regional floras.
