= Gyalideopsis sessilis =

Scientific classification
- Kingdom: Fungi
- Division: Ascomycota
- Class: Lecanoromycetes
- Order: Graphidales
- Family: Gomphillaceae
- Genus: Gyalideopsis
- Species: G. sessilis

Binomial name
- Gyalideopsis sessilis W.B.Sanders & Lücking (2015)

Species of lichen

Gyalideopsis sessilis is a species of foliicolous (leaf-dwelling) lichen in the family Gomphillaceae. Found in Florida, it was formally described as a new species in 2015 by lichenologists William Sanders and Robert Lücking.

== Taxonomy ==
Gyalideopsis sessile was formally described by William Sanders and Robert Lücking as a new species distinct from Gyalideopsis vulgaris. The species epithet refers to the typically sessile propagule of diahyphae and incorporated photobionts. The type specimen was collected by the first author in Lee County, Florida, at the Florida Gulf Coast University campus on September 14, 2014.

== Description ==
The thallus of Gyalideopsis sessile is continuous to areolate, measuring 2–10 mm across and 15–25 μm thick. Its surface is irregularly verrucose due to the presence of calcium oxalate crystals, giving the lichen a distinct appearance. The apothecia are broadly sessile, light tan to orange-brown in color, and measure 0.15–0.3 mm in diameter. The lichen typically produces 1–2 (rarely 4) oblong to vermiform, 11–19 septate ascospores per ascus, which measure 50–80 by 6–12 μm. No substances have been detected in Gyalideopsis sessile using thin-layer chromatography.

== Habitat and Distribution ==
Gyalideopsis sessile has been found growing on the leaf blades of Sabal palmetto in live oak hammocks, specifically in Lee County, Florida. Additional specimens have been collected from Florida Gulf Coast University campus and Caloosahatchee Regional Park in Alva, Florida.
