= Tricharia atrocarpa =

Scientific classification
- Kingdom: Fungi
- Division: Ascomycota
- Class: Lecanoromycetes
- Order: Graphidales
- Family: Gomphillaceae
- Genus: Tricharia
- Species: T. atrocarpa

Binomial name
- Tricharia atrocarpa Lücking & Sipman (2005)
- Type locality: Kinabalu Park, Malaysia

Species of lichen-forming fungus

Tricharia variratae is a species of foliicolous (leaf-dwelling) crustose lichen in the family Gomphillaceae that was described as a new species in 2005. The type was collected in Malaysia on Borneo (Sabah), in Kinabalu Park at 1,800 m elevation, from leaves in May 1989. It is separated from other Tricharia species by its truly lecideine, black apothecia and its 3-septate ascospores (spores divided by three septa).

The thallus forms pale greenish to whitish-grey crusts about 5–10 mm across, with a slightly irregular surface, and bears black, sterile setae 0.5–1 mm long. Its apothecia are numerous, rounded, and small (0.2–0.3 mm wide), remaining black even when moist. They are strongly concave to almost urn-shaped (urceolate), with the disc deeply submerged and a thin but strongly prominent margin. Microscopically, the excipulum is brownish-black and structureless (25–30 μm thick), the hypothecium is dark brownish-black (10–15 μm), and the hymenium is colourless (about 50 μm). The paraphyses are richly branched and interconnected, the asci are narrowly clavate (about 50 × 12 μm), and the ascospores are slightly constricted at the septa and measure 10–12 × 3–3.5 μm. Hyphophores were not observed. While most Tricharia species have paler, translucent apothecia, species with dark brown apothecia (such as Santricharia farinosa and Tricharis pseudosantessonii) differ by having somewhat muriform to muriform (multichambered) ascospores.
