= Tricharia nigriuncinata =

Scientific classification
- Kingdom: Fungi
- Division: Ascomycota
- Class: Lecanoromycetes
- Order: Graphidales
- Family: Gomphillaceae
- Genus: Tricharia
- Species: T. nigriuncinata

Binomial name
- Tricharia nigriuncinata Yeshitela, Eb.Fisch., Killmann & Sérus. (2011)
- Holotype site: Budongo Forest, Uganda

Species of lichen

Tricharia nigriuncinata is a species of foliicolous (leaf-dwelling) lichen in the family Gomphillaceae. It is found in East Africa.

== Taxonomy ==
The lichen was formally described as new to science in 2011 by the lichenologists Kumelachew Yeshitela, Eberhard Fischer, Dorothee Killmann, and Emmanuël Sérusiaux. The type specimen was collected by the first author from Budongo Forest at an elevation of 1,000 m (3,300 ft), where it was found growing on the leaves of Argomuellera macrophylla. The species name nigriuncinata alludes to the distinctive hooked structures found on the setae of this species.

== Description ==
Tricharia nigriuncinata is a leaf-dwelling (epiphyllous) lichen that forms a continuous, smooth, and thin thallus that is greyish-green in colour and spans up to 5 mm in width. The lichen is characterised by its abundance of sterile setae, which are black, setiform, and can be simple or adorned with 1 to 6 horizontal or downward-bending hooks near the middle. These setae can reach lengths of up to 1.5 mm and are about 0.04 mm thick at their base.

The photobiont of this species is chlorococcoid, comprising spherical green algal cells that measure 5 to 8 μm in diameter. In terms of reproductive structures, apothecia (fruiting bodies) are typically absent but can occasionally be abundant. When present, these apothecia are sessile and round, measuring 0.1 to 0.2 mm in diameter and approximately 75 μm in height. The disc of the apothecia is light orange to almost translucent and opaque, lying flat without any pruina. The margin is thin and either non-prominent or slightly so, smooth, and pale brown, usually darker than the disc.

In the structure of the apothecia, the excipulum is gelatinised and prosoplectenchymatous (i.e., its constituent fungal hyphae are all aligned in a particular direction), measuring 20 to 30 μm in thickness and light brown in colour. The hypothecium is about 10 μm thick and hyaline (translucent), while the epihymenium is pale brown and 5 to 8 μm high. The hymenium is clear and measures 40 to 50 μm in thickness. The paraphyses of the lichen are branched and anastomosing, approximately 1 μm thick. The asci are broadly clavate (club-shaped) and typically contain 1 to 2 spores, measuring 50 to 65 μm by 35 to 50 μm. The ascospores are hyaline (translucent), muriform (divided into numerous compartments by intersecting longitudinal and transverse septa), ellipsoidal in shape, and measure 40 to 55 μm by 15 to 25 μm.

== Habitat and distribution ==
Tricharia nigriuncinata is predominantly found on leaves in the lower layers of dense, undisturbed rainforests. Its presence is largely restricted to the Albertine Rift, an area in East Africa known for its rich biodiversity. This species is prevalent on the western side of the Rift, particularly in the Democratic Republic of the Congo.
