= Roselviria =

Scientific classification
- Domain: Eukaryota
- Kingdom: Fungi
- Division: Ascomycota
- Class: Lecanoromycetes
- Order: Graphidales
- Family: Gomphillaceae
- Genus: Roselviria; Xavier-Leite, M.Cáceres & Lücking (2023)

Type species
- Roselviria purulhensis (Lücking & Barillas) Xavier-Leite, M.Cáceres & Lücking (2023)

Species
- R. lobulimarginata R. purulhensis

Genus of lichens

Roselviria is a small genus of lichen-forming fungi in the family Gomphillaceae. It has two species of leaf-dwelling lichens.

== Taxonomy ==
The genus was circumscribed in 2023 by the lichenologists Amanda Xavier-Leite, Marcela Cáceres, and Robert Lücking. The genus was named in honour of Roselvira Barillas, who pioneered the study of foliicolous lichens in Guatemala.

The type species of the genus is Roselviria purulhensis, which was originally described as Tricharia purulhensis and later transferred to Aderkomyces before being recognised as belonging to its own genus. Molecular studies have shown that Roselviria is distinct from Aderkomyces, despite sharing some physical features like white setae. This finding suggests that these similar features evolved independently multiple times within the family.

== Description ==
The lichens in this genus grow on living leaves and form a continuous layer on the leaf surface. Their most distinctive feature is their reproductive structures (apothecia), which protrude from the surface and are surrounded by small triangular lobes, similar to those found in the genus Chroodiscus. These structures are pale in colour and have two distinct margins: an inner proper margin and an outer thalline margin that forms the triangular lobes.

Under the microscope, these lichens reveal several clear layers, including a colourless supporting tissue made of tightly packed fungal threads. They also possess specialised reproductive structures called hyphophores, which are white and bristle-like, with unique bead-like threads (diahyphae) attached at their tips.

== Species ==
- Roselviria lobulimarginata (Sipman & Lücking) Xavier-Leite, M.Cáceres & Lücking (2023)
- Roselviria purulhensis (Lücking & Barillas) Xavier-Leite, M.Cáceres & Lücking (2023)
