= Gyalideopsis aptrootii =

Scientific classification
- Kingdom: Fungi
- Division: Ascomycota
- Class: Lecanoromycetes
- Order: Graphidales
- Family: Gomphillaceae
- Genus: Gyalideopsis
- Species: G. aptrootii

Binomial name
- Gyalideopsis aptrootii Xavier-Leite, M.Cáceres & Lücking (2018)

Species of lichen

Gyalideopsis aptrootii is a species of corticolous lichen in the family Gomphillaceae. Found in southern Brazil, it was described as a new species in 2018. Defining features of this lichen include the unique crescent-shaped structure of its hyphophores (spore-producing organs), the single-spored asci, and the relatively small size of the ascospores.

== Taxonomy ==
The lichen species Gyalideopsis aptrootii was formally described and classified by Amanda Barreto Xavier-Leite, Marcela Cáceres, and Robert Lücking in 2018. This species stands out from others within the genus Gyalideopsis genus due to its crescent-shaped hyphophores that bear a resemblance to certain species of Gyalectidium and the genus Hippocrepidea. The species was named in honour of Dutch lichenologist André Aptroot, "for his numerous contributions to tropical lichenology and his continuous mentorship". The type specimen was discovered by Cáceres and Aptroot in the Parque Estadual do Acaraí, located in São Francisco do Sul, Santa Catarina, Brazil.

== Description ==
Gyalideopsis aptrootii is a corticolous lichen, which means it grows on tree bark. Its thallus spreads 10–30 mm (0.4–1.2 in) across and has a thickness of 30–70 μm. The white to pale grey crustose thallus lacks clusters of calcium oxalate crystals and has a cartilaginous, corticiform layer, giving it an uneven appearance. The photobiont, or the photosynthetic partner of the lichen, comprises trebouxioid cells, each measuring 5–8 μm in diameter.

The lichen is distinguishable by its broadly sessile apothecia, which are biatorine, circular structures that are 0.3–0.6 mm in diameter and 0.1–0.15 mm high. Its disc is dark brownish grey, and it has a prominent proper margin of the same or slightly lighter colour. The lichen's ascospores are broadly ellipsoid, colourless, and measure 20–35 by 15–20 μm.

A defining feature of this species is its unique hyphophores, which are crescent-shaped, flabellate (fan-shaped) structures. They are attached to the thallus along a broad line on the concave side, lending a distinctive look to this lichen. The hyphophores are blackish grey and have a rim of partially translucent, narrow hyphal scales along the convex periphery.

== Similar species ==
Gyalideopsis aptrootii shares some similarities with Gyalideopsis krogiae, a related lichen found in Kenya. However, the latter has fan-shaped hyphophores with a reddish-brown hue and lacks the distinctive acute edges found in Gyalideopsis aptrootii. Furthermore, Gyalideopsis krogiae has larger ascospores and apothecia.

Gyalideopsis aptrootii shares some features with species from the genera Gyalectidium and Hippocrepidea, particularly in the shape of their hyphophores. However, these genera are significantly different in terms of their apothecial morphology and anatomy.

== Habitat and distribution ==
At the time of its original publication, Gyalideopsis aptrootii had only been identified in a preserved coastal forest habitat in the extratropical portion of southern Brazil. There, it prefers to grow on bark.
