= Aderkomyces sikkimensis =

Scientific classification
- Domain: Eukaryota
- Kingdom: Fungi
- Division: Ascomycota
- Class: Lecanoromycetes
- Order: Graphidales
- Family: Gomphillaceae
- Genus: Aderkomyces
- Species: A. sikkimensis

Binomial name
- Aderkomyces sikkimensis Pinokiyo, Kr.P.Singh & Lücking (2006)

Species of lichen

Aderkomyces sikkimensis is a species of foliicolous (leaf-dwelling) crustose lichen in the family Gomphillaceae. Found in India, it was formally described as a new species in 2006 by Athokpam Pinokiyo, Krishna Pal Singh, and Robert Lücking. The type specimen was collected by the first author from a subtropical forest near Damthang (Sikkim). It has also been recorded from the Darjeeling district of West Bengal. The specific epithet refers to the region of the type locality.

The lichen has a thin grey thallus that is continuous in its central area but dispersed in the peripheries; it measures 30–40 mm (1.2–1.6 in) across. The photobiont partner is a species of Chlorococcaceae with greenish, rounded cells measuring 8–14 μm in diameter. The ascospores of Aderkomyces sikkimensis are muriform (divided into chambers), oblong to ellipsoid in shape, and measure 28–40 by 15–26 μm.
