= Gyalideopsis macarthurii =

Scientific classification
- Kingdom: Fungi
- Division: Ascomycota
- Class: Lecanoromycetes
- Order: Graphidales
- Family: Gomphillaceae
- Genus: Gyalideopsis
- Species: G. macarthurii

Binomial name
- Gyalideopsis macarthurii Lücking, L.Umaña & Aptroot (2006)
- Holotype: Tenorio Volcano National Park, Costa Rica

Species of lichen

Gyalideopsis macarthurii is a species of corticolous (bark-dwelling) crustose lichen in the family Gomphillaceae. The pale greenish-grey lichen forms thin, shiny crusts on bark and rotting logs in montane cloud forest environments, particularly in exposed areas along forest edges and pastures, and has been documented in Costa Rica, Florida, and Brazil. It is distinguished by its distinctive fruiting bodies with thin triangular lobes covering the margins, extremely small specialized reproductive structures called hyphophores, and its habit of growing on bark rather than leaves, which separates it from its closest relative, Gyalideopsis lobulata.

== Taxonomy ==
Gyalideopsis macarthurii was described in 2006 by the lichenologists Robert Lücking, Loengrin Umaña, and André Aptroot. The species epithet macarthurii honours the MacArthur Foundation, which has been a supporter of Instituto Nacional de Biodiversidad and conservation efforts in Costa Rica. The type specimen was collected in the province of Alajuela, within the Cordillera de Tilarán. It was found in Tenorio Volcano National Park, part of the Arenal-Tilarán-Tempisque Conservation Area, at the Pilón Biological Station. The collection took place at an elevation of 700 m (2,300 ft) in the lower montane cloud forest zone, where the species was found on wet, rotting logs in exposed areas, including trees and fence posts along pasture.

This species belongs to the genus Gyalideopsis within the family Gomphillaceae, order Graphidales. It is distinguished from other species in the genus by its distinctive fruiting bodies with thin thalline lobules covering the margins, and by its extremely small reproductive structures called hyphophores. The only closely related species with similar characteristics is Gyalideopsis lobulata, which differs by growing on leaves rather than bark and having yellowish brown fruiting bodies without a powdery coating.

== Description ==
Gyalideopsis macarthurii forms a thin, crustose (crust-like) thallus on bark. The thallus is continuous, measuring 5–10 mm across and only 10–20 μm thick, with a cartilaginous outer layer. Its surface is irregularly warty (verrucose) due to clusters of calcium oxalate crystals. The lichen is pale greenish-grey in colour and has a shiny (nitidous) appearance. The photosynthetic partner (photobiont) of the lichen consists of green algae (trebouxioid) with cells measuring 5–9 μm in diameter.

The reproductive structures (apothecia) are distinctive for this species. They emerge from the surface (erumpent), are round in outline, and measure 0.15–0.25 mm in diameter and 70–90 μm in height. The disc is flat and dark greyish brown with a coarse, white to pale grey powdery coating (pruina). The proper margin (edge) of the apothecia is inconspicuous and covered by 4–6 triangular, thin, pale grey, thalline lobules that lack algal cells.

The spore-producing layer (hymenium) is colourless and 50–60 μm high. The spore sacs (asci) are broadly club-shaped, measuring 45–55 by 20–25 μm. Each ascus produces a single, ellipsoid spore that is muriform (divided by both longitudinal and transverse walls), with slight constrictions at the dividing walls. The spores measure 35–40 by 12–18 μm, are 2.5–3 times as long as broad, and are colourless.

The hyphophores (specialized asexual reproductive structures) are distinctive, being shortly bristle-shaped with a pointed tip, measuring 0.04–0.06 mm high and 10–12 μm thick above the base. They are blackish brown with a pale base. The diahyphae (specialized hyphae inserted at the apex of hyphophores) are branched throughout, shallowly moniliform (resembling a string of beads), with segments broadly club-shaped or drop-shaped to ellipsoid, measuring 4–6 by 2–2.5 μm. Terminal segments are ellipsoid, often with one septum (internal wall), and colourless.

== Habitat and distribution ==
Gyalideopsis macarthurii was initially discovered in Costa Rica, where it was found in the Volcán Tenorio National Park (Pilón Biological Station) in the Cordillera de Tilarán region. The species inhabits lower montane cloud forest zones at an elevation of approximately 700 meters above sea level. The lichen has been collected growing on wet, rotting logs and on the bark of lower tree trunks in exposed areas along pastures. These habitats are characteristic of edges between forest and cleared land in the montane regions of Costa Rica, suggesting the species may prefer slightly disturbed environments with high humidity. The geographic range of the species was later expanded when it was recorded from Florida, USA in 2007, and subsequently from Brazil in 2023. G. macarthurii remains one of 27 Gyalideopsis species that have been reported from Costa Rica.
