= Gyalideopsis ellipsoidea =

Scientific classification
- Kingdom: Fungi
- Division: Ascomycota
- Class: Lecanoromycetes
- Order: Graphidales
- Family: Gomphillaceae
- Genus: Gyalideopsis
- Species: G. ellipsoidea

Binomial name
- Gyalideopsis ellipsoidea A.A.Menezes, M.Cáceres & Aptroot (2013)

Species of lichen

Gyalideopsis ellipsoidea is a species of corticolous (bark-dwelling) crustose lichen in the family Gomphillaceae. It occurs in northeastern Brazil, where it grows on the smooth bark of trees in Caatinga forest ecosystems.

== Taxonomy ==
Gyalideopsis ellipsoidea was first described in 2013 by Aline Anjos Menezes, Marcela Cáceres, and André Aptroot from specimens collected by Menezes in the Chapada do Araripe region of northeastern Brazil.

== Description ==
Gyalideopsis ellipsoidea is a crustose lichen, meaning it grows as a thin crust closely adhering to its substrate. It features a shiny grey thallus that is very thin and follows the contours of the bark surface. The thallus is surrounded by a narrow black prothallus line (a border-like structure). The reproductive structures (ascomata) are superficial, appearing on the surface rather than embedded in the thallus. These structures range from round to elongated, measuring 0.2–0.4 mm wide and 0.2–0.6 mm long. They have a concave dark grey disc that is not pruinose (lacking a powdery coating). The margin around the disc is raised, sometimes curving inward, and pale grey, approximately 0.1 mm wide.

Under microscopic examination, G. ellipsoidea has distinctive features including:

- A black hypothecium (the tissue beneath the spore-producing layer) that extends between the hamathecium (sterile tissue among the asci) and the excipulum (outer protective layer)
- Lax paraphyses (sterile filaments) that are mostly unbranched with gnarled, brown tips
- Cylindrical-clavate asci (spore-producing cells) containing eight ascospores each
- Hyaline (colorless), broadly fusiform to somewhat clavate ascospores with 3 septa, measuring 11–13 by 5.5–6.5 μm

The species does not produce any secondary metabolites detectable by standard chemical tests or thin-layer chromatography.

It differs from similar species like Gyalideopsis philippiae by its dark grey disc, black hypothecium, and ascospores with three septa. While many Gyalideopsis species have richly anastomosing (interconnecting) paraphyses, G. ellipsoidea has mostly unbranched paraphyses, which appear to correlate with its numerous asci.

== Habitat and distribution ==
Gyalideopsis ellipsoidea has been documented growing on the smooth bark of trees in Caatinga forest ecosystems. The Caatinga is a unique biome in northeastern Brazil characterized by xerophytic, woody, thorny, and deciduous vegetation adapted to semi-arid conditions. So far, the species has only been found in the Chapada do Araripe region in Ceará state of Brazil, at approximately 900 meters elevation. It has been observed growing alongside Chiodecton sphaerale, another lichen species. G. ellipsoidea is one of 26 species of the genus Gyalideopsis known to occur in Brazil.
