= Gyalideopsis crenulata =

Scientific classification
- Kingdom: Fungi
- Division: Ascomycota
- Class: Lecanoromycetes
- Order: Graphidales
- Family: Gomphillaceae
- Genus: Gyalideopsis
- Species: G. crenulata

Binomial name
- Gyalideopsis crenulata Coppins & Aptroot (2008)

Species of lichen

Gyalideopsis crenulata is a species of saxicolous (rock-dwelling) lichen in the family Gomphillaceae. This inconspicuous lichen forms thin, pale grey to brownish films on rock fragments and is distinguished by its tiny, dark fruiting bodies with distinctively scalloped margins that give the species its name. It appears to be a specialist of disturbed mine spoil environments, where it grows on flat stones lying on fine material that provides the damp conditions it requires. It is known only from two copper-mining sites in Wales.

== Taxonomy ==
Gyalideopsis crenulata was described as new to science by Brian Coppins and André Aptroot in 2008. The holotype was collected from mine spoil in Gwydir Forest, Caernarfonshire, Wales, on 25 October 1994. It was separated from similar species chiefly by its tiny, dark fruiting bodies (apothecia) with a distinctly scalloped (crenate) rim and by its smaller, only partially multi-septate ("submuriform") spores; it keys out near G. lecideina, which has larger, fully muriform spores. Superficially it can resemble Polysporina simplex, but that species has simple (non-septate) spores.

== Description ==
The thallus is very thin and continuous, forming an inconspicuous pale grey to brownish film on rock. Disc-like fruiting bodies (apothecia) are emergent, 0.2–0.3 mm in diameter, with a dark brown to black disc and a thick, dark, scalloped margin. In section, the uppermost pigmented layer (epihymenium) is red-brown, while the layer beneath the spore-bearing tissue (hypothecium) is colourless. The supporting threads (paraphyses) are very slender (about 1 μm wide) and interconnect (anastomose). The spore sacs (asci) are club-shaped, eight-spored, 55–75 × 15–25 μm. Spores are colourless, ellipsoid, 14–21.5 × 11–14.5 μm, with three cross-walls and one or two lengthwise walls (hence "submuriform"). No asexual propagules (pycnidia or hyphophores) were seen, and no lichen products were detected by chemical tests.

== Habitat and distribution ==
The species grows on small rock fragments (slate or pebbles) in copper-mining sites, although the particular stones on which it occurs do not themselves appear copper-rich. It has been recorded from two Welsh localities: the type site in Gwydir Forest (Caernarfonshire) and a second site at Eaglebrook Mine, Ceredigion (Cardiganshire). On the sampled fragments it occurred without other lichens, suggesting a narrow ecological niche in disturbed mine spoil. Gyalideopsis crenulata prefers flat stones lying on fine spoil material that provides damper conditions, typically occurring as isolated individuals with few associated species.
