= Gyalideopsis heardensis =

Scientific classification
- Kingdom: Fungi
- Division: Ascomycota
- Class: Lecanoromycetes
- Order: Graphidales
- Family: Gomphillaceae
- Genus: Gyalideopsis
- Species: G. heardensis

Binomial name
- Gyalideopsis heardensis Øvstedal (2008)

Species of lichen

Gyalideopsis heardensis is a species of crustose lichen in the family Gomphillaceae. This inconspicuous lichen forms thin, grey to grey-green crusts on rotting vegetation and is distinguished by its unusually large, strongly multi-celled spores contained singly within each spore sac. It is endemic to the remote subantarctic Heard Island, where it grows in the island's harsh, cold, and extremely wet climate.

== Taxonomy ==
Gyalideopsis heardensis was described as new to science by Dag Øvstedal in 2008 during a survey of the lichens of subantarctic Heard Island. The species was originally published with the epithet spelled heardense, but this has been corrected to heardensis to agree grammatically with the feminine genus name Gyalideopsis, following the rules of Latin nomenclature that require adjectives to match the gender of the noun they modify. The holotype was collected near Atlas Cove at about 25 m elevation by N.J.M. Gremmen (specimen H-1273, ADT). The authors had earlier listed the same material only as "Lopadium sp.", but closer study showed it belongs in Gyalideopsis. The species most closely resembles G. stipitata from Ecuador, yet differs in having non-stalked apothecia and lacking hyphophores (tiny reproductive propagules), among other points.

== Description ==
The thallus of G. heardensis is a thin, grey to grey-green crust (ecorticate, i.e., without a protective outer skin) that spreads to only a few centimetres across. No hyphophores were seen. The photosynthetic partner is a green alga of the genus Trebouxia (trebouxioid). Disc-like fruiting bodies (apothecia) are numerous, sit directly on the thallus (sessile), and are dark brown to brown-black, usually up to about 1 mm in diameter with a prominent proper margin.

Microscopically, the spore-bearing layer (hymenium) is about 0.1 mm tall; the exciple is built of thin, interwoven hyphae embedded in a gelatinous matrix and is mostly colourless, shading to brown at the outer edge. Each ascus contains a single, large, strongly multi-celled (muriform) spore, typically 65–70 × 20–26 μm. No lichen products were detected by thin-layer chromatography.

== Habitat and distribution ==
The species was found on rotting grass leaves on Heard Island and is so far known only from the type collection. Heard Island has a cold, windy, very wet climate and is largely glaciated, conditions that favour low, inconspicuous crusts such as this one.
