= Graphis alboscripta =

Scientific classification
- Kingdom: Fungi
- Division: Ascomycota
- Class: Lecanoromycetes
- Order: Graphidales
- Family: Graphidaceae
- Genus: Graphis
- Species: G. alboscripta

Binomial name
- Graphis alboscripta Coppins & P.James (1992)

Synonyms
- Fissurina alboscripta (Coppins & P.James) Staiger (2002)

Species of lichen

Graphis alboscripta, commonly known as white script lichen, is a species of epiphytic lichen that is endemic to the west coast of Scotland. Nationally rare, its distribution is confined to hazel woodlands.

== See also ==
- Flora of Scotland
- Jamesiella scotica
