= Echinoplaca =

Scientific classification
- Kingdom: Fungi
- Division: Ascomycota
- Class: Lecanoromycetes
- Order: Graphidales
- Family: Gomphillaceae
- Genus: Echinoplaca; Fée (1825)

Type species
- Echinoplaca epiphylla Fée (1825)

Synonyms
- Artheliopsis Vain. (1896); Arthotheliopsis Vain. (1896); Arthotheliopsidomyces Cif. & Tomas. (1953); Pycnodermellina Bat. & H.Maia (1957); Phallomyces Bat. & Valle (1961); Sporocybomyces H.Maia (1967)

Genus of lichen-forming fungi

Echinoplaca is a genus of lichen-forming fungi in the family Gomphillaceae.

== Species ==
As of April 2023, Species Fungorum (in the Catalogue of Life) accepts 18 species of Echinoplaca.

- Echinoplaca areolata Lücking & W.R.Buck (2007)
- Echinoplaca atromuralis Lücking (2008)
- Echinoplaca basalis W.B.Sanders & Lücking (2015)
- Echinoplaca campanulata Kalb & Vězda (2000)
- Echinoplaca caruaruensis M.Cáceres & Lücking (2007)
- Echinoplaca epiphylla Fée (1825)
- Echinoplaca epiphylloides Lücking (2008)
- Echinoplaca furcata Sérus. (1989)
- Echinoplaca hispida Sipman (1993)
- Echinoplaca leucomuralis Lücking (2008)
- Echinoplaca leucotrichoides (Vain.) R.Sant. (1952)
- Echinoplaca macgregorii (Vain.) Lücking, Sérus. & Vězda (2005)
- Echinoplaca pellicula (Müll.Arg.) R.Sant. (1952)
- Echinoplaca pernambucensis Øvstedal & Elix (2011)
- Echinoplaca schizidiifera J.E.Hern. & Lücking (2011)
- Echinoplaca tetrapla (Zahlbr.) Lücking (2001)
- Echinoplaca verrucifera Lücking (1997)
- Echinoplaca vezdana Lücking & Kalb (2001)
- Echinoplaca wilsoniorum Lücking (2008)
