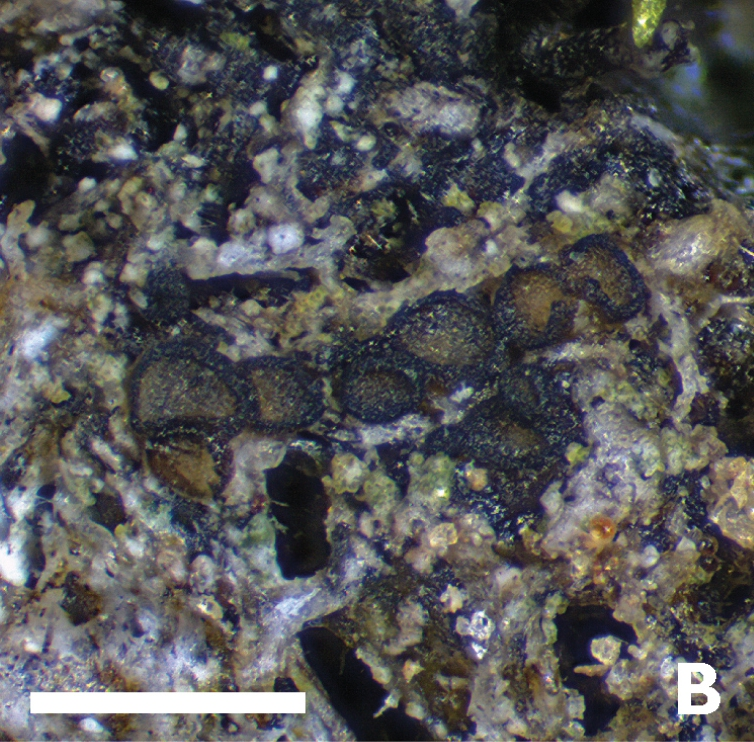
- Gyalidea subscutellaris; scale bar=0.5 mm

Scientific classification
- Kingdom: Fungi
- Division: Ascomycota
- Class: Lecanoromycetes
- Order: Graphidales
- Family: Gomphillaceae
- Genus: Gyalidea; Lettau ex Vězda (1966)

Type species
- Gyalidea lecideopsis (A.Massal.) Lettau ex Vězda (1966)

Synonyms
- Actinopelte Stizenb. (1861); Aglaothecium Groenh. (1962); Cappellettia Tomas. & Cif. (1952); Solorinella Anzi (1860); Solorinellomyces Cif. & Tomas. (1953)

= Gyalidea =

Genus of lichen

Gyalidea is a genus of crustose lichens in the family Gomphillaceae. It has 50 species.

== Description ==
Gyalidea forms a thin, crust-like thallus that sits flat on the substrate. It is usually smooth but may be faintly cracked, and in some species becomes slightly gelatinous when damp. The thallus often spreads as a diffuse film and lacks a distinct border (no prothallus). The photosynthetic partner is a green alga of the Trebouxia type (trebouxioid), consisting of single, rounded cells embedded among the fungal threads.

The sexual fruiting bodies (apothecia) range from urn-shaped (urceolate) to flat. They are typically pale cream through olive-brown to blackish brown, and can appear translucent when wet. The rim around the disc (the true exciple) is well developed, raised, and generally darker than the centre. Inside, the spore-bearing layer (hymenium) is colourless in water but often shows a positive iodine reaction, staining yellow to reddish-brown. The apothecium is filled with many slender, partitioned threads (paraphyses) that rarely thicken at the tips; these, together with the spore sacs, are bound in a jelly-like matrix.

The spore sacs (asci) usually contain eight spores (occasionally fewer), and are thin-walled except for a slightly thickened cap (apical tholus) at the tip; they are iodine-negative in the standard K/I test and may show a small "ocular chamber". The ascospores themselves are colourless, ellipsoid to spindle-shaped, and divided by cross-walls—and in some species also by lengthwise walls—ranging from three-septate to brick-like (muriform); the walls are often a little pinched at the divisions, and a thin outer coat (perispore) may be present. Asexual structures (pycnidia) occur as tiny black dots immersed in the thallus, producing rod-shaped conidia. Thin-layer chromatography has not detected characteristic lichen products in the genus.

== Species ==
- Gyalidea asteriscus (Anzi) Aptroot & Lücking (2003)
- Gyalidea austrocoreana S.Y.Kondr., Lőkös & Hur (2016)
- Gyalidea corticola Pooja Gupta & G.P.Sinha (2015) – India
- Gyalidea diaphana (Nyl.) Vězda )1978)
- Gyalidea fritzei (Stein) Vězda (1966)
- Gyalidea fructicola M.Svenss. & G.Thor (2007) – Europe
- Gyalidea fuscoclavata M.Svenss. (2012) – South America
- Gyalidea goughensis Øvstedal (2010) – Tristan da Cunha
- Gyalidea hensseniae Hafellner, Poelt & Vězda (1900)
- Gyalidea hyalinescens (Nyl.) Vězda (1966)
- Gyalidea izuensis H.Harada (2016) – Japan
- Gyalidea koreana J.P.Halda, S.Y.Kondr., Lőkös & Hur (2019) – Korea
- Gyalidea lecideopsis (A.Massal.) Lettau ex Vězda (1966)
- Gyalidea luzonensis (Kalb & Vězda) Aptroot & Lücking (2003)
- Gyalidea mayaguezensis Vězda (1966)
- Gyalidea oosumiensis H.Harada & A.Sakata (2016) – Japan
- Gyalidea pisutii J.P.Halda, S.Y.Kondr., Lőkös & Hur (2019)
- Gyalidea poeltii S.Y.Kondr., Lőkös, J.P.Halda & Hur (2019)
- Gyalidea polyspora R.Sant. (2007) – Europe
- Gyalidea rivularis (Eitner) J.Novák & Tobol. (1975)
- Gyalidea ropalosporoides S.Y.Kondr., Lőkös & Hur (2016)
- Gyalidea roseola (Arnold) Lettau ex Vězda (1966)
- Gyalidea subminuta van den Boom (2015)
- Gyalidea subscutellaris (Vězda) Vězda (1966)
- Gyalidea vezdae S.Y.Kondr., L.Lőkös, J.P.Halda & J.-S.Hur (2019)
- Gyalidea vonkonratii Lumbsch & Papong (2009)
