= Kansri Boonpragob =

Thai lichenologist and climatologist

- กัณฑรีย์ บุญประกอบ

Academic work
- Discipline: Ecology; botany
- Sub-discipline: Lichenology
- Institutions: Ramkhamhaeng University

Kansri Boonpragob (Thai: กัณฑรีย์ บุญประกอบ, RTGS: Kansi Bunprakop) is a lichenologist and climatologist from Thailand, who leads the Lichen Research Unit at Ramkhamhaeng University. In 2024, she was awarded the Acharius Medal for her achievements in lichenology.

== Education ==
Boonpragob completed her bachelor's degree at Kasetsart University in Bangkok, followed by a master's degree in Tennessee. She later earned a diploma in environmental management and protection from the Technical University in Dresden. In 1987, she completed her PhD at Arizona State University under the supervision of Tom Nash, focusing on the ecophysiology and impact of air pollution on lichens, particularly Ramalina menziesii in California.

== Career ==
Boonpragob is Emeritus Professor and former Head of the Lichen Research Unit and Assistant Professor of Biological Science at Ramkhamhaeng University. She has published widely, including more than 50 scientific journal articles, several books, and numerous introductory works on lichens, ecology, and botany written in Thai. She also has a PhD in Ecology. During 2007 she held a post as Vice-Chair of the Intergovernmental Panel on Climate Change's Working Group I. As part of the IPCC team, she shared in the 2007 Nobel Peace Prize. Boonpragob's research has demonstrated that there are already severe economic impacts on Thailand due to the ongoing climate crisis. Much of this impact is on coastal regions, where livelihoods as well as species, are at risk. She is a member of the Graphidaceae Project, administered by the Field Museum. In 2008 she organized the first workshop on thelotremoid Graphidaceae in Thailand. She later organized the International Association for Lichenology (IAL7) congress in 2012. She is a member of the Editorial Board for the Journal of Tropical Forest Research.

The lichen Ocellularia kansriae is named after Boonpragob, who collected specimens from Eastern Thailand.

== See also ==
- Category:Taxa named by Kansri Boonpragob
