= P. James (magician) =

P. James (née V. Kennedy) is a magician from the city of Chennai, in South India. He is best known for his famous guerrilla advertising campaign (inspired by Brooke Bond painted wagons), in which the phrase "P. James Magic Show" and his phone number are painted on virtually every street in the city. It has been estimated that there are at least 30,000 instances of his advertisement. James adopted his stage name after his grandfather, also a performing magician.

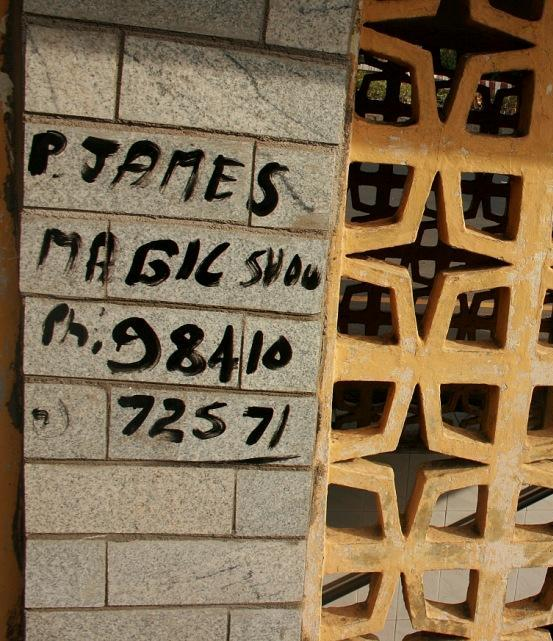
Sample of the infamous advert

Chennai is a city where the wall space is tightly controlled and shared by competing political parties. It is also dominated by advertisements for commercial goods and services. Despite this, James has achieved a high penetration with his marketing campaign, at a low cost. He has, however, spent a total of 14 years painting, setting out by himself at 9:30 PM. He uses a mixture of black oxide and Fevicol for the paint, as this is cheap, but also survives through rain. James' technique has been called naive by some observers. Indeed, the advertising campaign has not resulted in particularly high market share, although James attributes this to the increasing movement of magic from the stage to the television screen.

James' campaign has spawned several imitators, notably A-Z entertainment, which adopts a similar font and style of placement, though at a lower concentration. It is not known what link, if any, exists between the various organizations. It is also unknown what relationship James has with the nationally famous P.C.Sorkar, or with rising local talent, such as JMK Disco Raja.

In late 2007, James was requested by the Commissioner of Police to abstain from his sign-painting. This is the culmination of various efforts by authorities to put an end to James' advertising campaign.

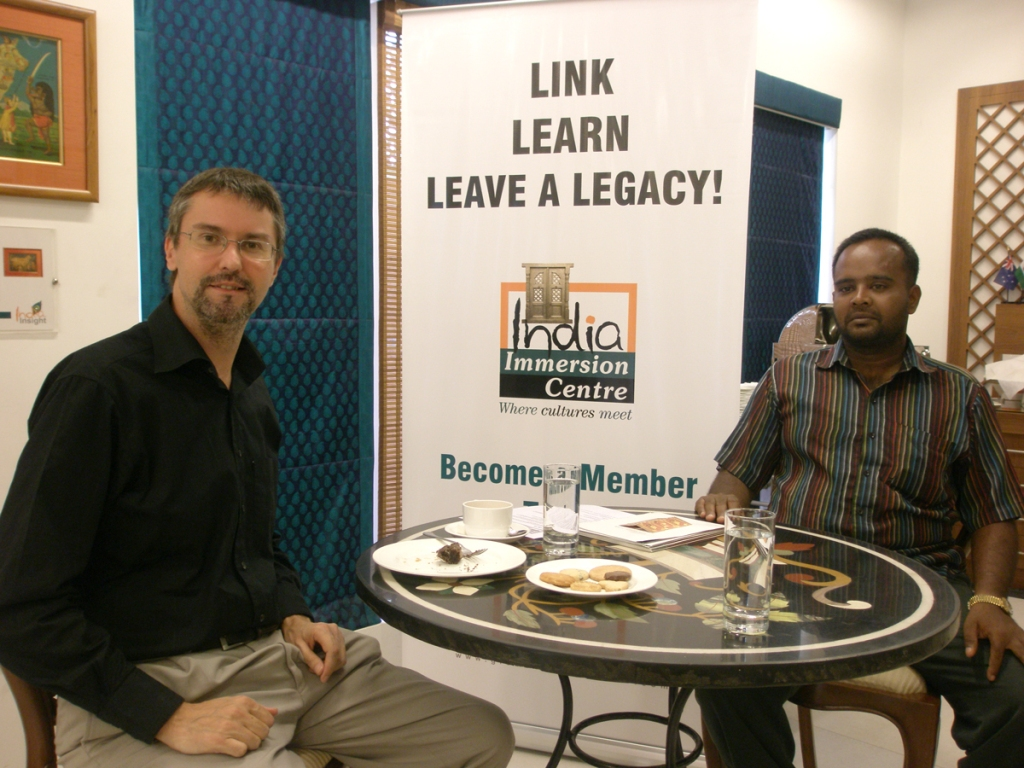
P James with British Author Darren Burnham

In August 2009 the magician lent his name to a book project called “Looking For P James”. The book was a photo journal of the city of Madras-Chennai which was written by the British author Darren Burnham and published by Global Adjustments
