= Gyalideopsis vainioi =

Scientific classification
- Kingdom: Fungi
- Division: Ascomycota
- Class: Lecanoromycetes
- Order: Graphidales
- Family: Gomphillaceae
- Genus: Gyalideopsis
- Species: G. vainioi

Binomial name
- Gyalideopsis vainioi Kalb & Vězda (1988)

Species of fungus

Gyalideopsis vainioi is a species of lichen in the family Gomphillaceae. It was described as new to science in 1988 by Klaus Kalb and Antonín Vězda from Brazilian collections. The variety Gyalideopsis vainioi var. semicirculata Lücking & W.R.Buck was published in 2007; it was found in Florida. The specific epithet honours Finnish lichenologist Edvard Vainio, known for his pioneering work with Brazilian lichens.
