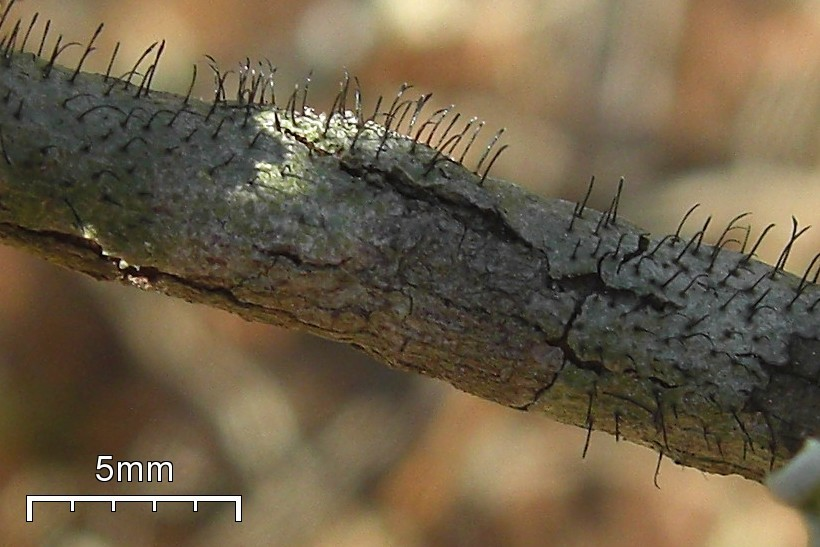
- Gyalideopsis buckii

Scientific classification
- Kingdom: Fungi
- Division: Ascomycota
- Class: Lecanoromycetes
- Order: Graphidales
- Family: Gomphillaceae
- Genus: Gyalideopsis; Vèzda (1972)

Type species
- Gyalideopsis peruviana G.Merr. ex Vězda (1972)

Synonyms
- Diploschistella Vain. (1926)

= Gyalideopsis =

Genus of lichen-forming fungi

Gyalideopsis is a genus of lichen-forming fungi in the family Gomphillaceae. Gyalideopsis species form delicate, film-like crusts on a wide variety of surfaces including tree bark, rocks, and mosses, often in tropical and temperate forests worldwide. Species in the genus produce distinctive small, scale-like structures called hyphophores, which are thought to aid in asexual reproduction where ascospore-producing structures are absent or uncommon. Members of this genus lack the distinctive chemical compounds found in many other lichens, making them reliant on microscopic features and spore characteristics for scientific identification.

== Taxonomy ==
Gyalideopsis was erected by the Czech lichenologist Antonín Vězda in 1972, during work towards a revision of the Gyalectaceae and other groups with "gyalectoid" (gyalectacean-like) apothecia (disc-shaped fruiting bodies). Vězda had found two poorly placed species (then known as Gyalecta peruviana and Lecidea athalloides) that resembled Gyalidea in general form and many anatomical traits, but differed in having a dense network of branched, interconnected paraphysoids (sterile filaments in the spore-bearing layer) rather than the unbranched, septate paraphyses typical of Gyalidea. When similar material reached him from Peter W. James in 1970, a comparative study of four taxa led Vězda to treat them as all in the same genus and to publish the new genus Gyalideopsis for them.

In the protologue, Vězda characterised Gyalideopsis as a crustose lichen with a thin, usually unbordered thallus containing a green Trebouxia photobiont, and dark apothecia with a persistent margin. Microscopically, both the apothecial margin (excipulum) and the hymenium are composed of slender hyphae that branch and anastomose in abundant gelatin; the asci have an apical apparatus of the "nasse" type; and the colourless spores are transversely septate or muriform (divided into many small compartments), often slightly constricted at their septa. Vězda designated Gyalideopsis peruviana as the type species.

On the basis of these characters, Vězda proposed placing the genus in the family Asterothyriaceae (as proposed by Rolf Santesson), a group then best known from foliicolous (leaf-dwelling) lichens. He considered Gyalideopsis closest to the asterothyriacean genera Tricharia and Calenia: compared with Tricharia, Gyalideopsis lacks thallus hairs and is not obligatorily leaf-dwelling, while Calenia differs in having apothecia covered by thallus tissue. In its original circumscription, Gyalideopsis contained four species: G. peruviana, G. anastomosans, and G. muscicola (all described as new) and G. athalloides (a new combination).

== Description ==
Gyalideopsis species have a thin, crust-like thallus that often forms a delicate, almost film-like layer over the substrate. The surface is usually smooth, only rarely becoming finely warted, and the thallus tends to spread diffusely rather than forming discrete rosettes. Many species produce distinctive hyphophores—small, erect, scale-like outgrowths thought to function in asexual reproduction where pycnidia are absent. The photosynthetic partner is a trebouxioid green alga (i.e. minute, single-celled algae of the genus Trebouxia or similar).

The sexual reproductive structures are apothecia, typically round and red-brown to almost black. When wetted they swell and become somewhat translucent, and they show a raised rim formed by fungal tissue; there is no thalline margin (the thallus does not wrap around the disc). Internally, both the apothecial rim (true exciple) and the spore-bearing layer (hymenium) are built from a loose, net-like mesh of very fine, branching hyphae embedded in a jelly-like matrix. The asci contain two to eight ascospores, range from cylindrical-club-shaped to egg-shaped, and have a thickened tip; their contents stain wine red in the K/I iodine test (potassium hydroxide pretreatment followed by iodine).

The ascospores are colourless and vary from simply cross-walled to densely muriform, meaning they are divided by many transverse and longitudinal septa into a brick-like pattern. Around each spore there is a perispore (an outer coat) that can be thin or relatively thick. No secondary metabolites have been detected by thin-layer chromatography, so there are no known diagnostic lichen substances in this genus.

== Species ==
As of March 2025, Species Fungorum (in the Catalogue of Life) accepts 52 species of Gyalideopsis.

- Gyalideopsis altamirensis Lücking & L.Umaña (2006)
- Gyalideopsis americana Lücking & W.R.Buck (2007)
- Gyalideopsis applanata Herrera-Camp. & Lücking (2003)
- Gyalideopsis aptrootii Xavier-Leite, M.Cáceres & Lücking (2018)
- Gyalideopsis arvidssonii Lücking (2008)
- Gyalideopsis bartramiorum Lendemer (2017)
- Gyalideopsis berenice (Ellis & Everh.) Lücking & W.R.Buck (2007)
- Gyalideopsis buckii Lücking, Sérus. & Vězda (2005)
- Gyalideopsis caespitosa Barcenas-Peña, Herrera-Camp. & Lücking (2019)
- Gyalideopsis chibaensis H.Harada (2008)
- Gyalideopsis chicaque B.Moncada & Lücking (2011)
- Gyalideopsis choshuencensis Lücking & V. Wirth (2003)
- Gyalideopsis crenulata Coppins & Aptroot (2008)
- Gyalideopsis cristata (Nyl.) Lücking, Sérus. & Vězda (2005)
- Gyalideopsis dominicana Vězda (2004)
- Gyalideopsis ellipsoidea A.A.Menezes, M.Cáceres & Aptroot (2013)
- Gyalideopsis epicorticis (A.Funk) Tønsberg & Vězda (2007)
- Gyalideopsis frahmii Aptroot & Schumm (2010)
- Gyalideopsis glauca (P.Karst.) Lücking, Sérus. & Vězda (2005)
- Gyalideopsis globispora Vězda (2004)
- Gyalideopsis graminicola Vězda & Kantvilas (1992)
- Gyalideopsis halocarpa P.M.McCarthy & Elix (2014)
- Gyalideopsis heardensis Øvstedal (2008)
- Gyalideopsis helvetica van den Boom & Vězda (2000)
- Gyalideopsis japonica H.Harada & Vězda (2000)
- Gyalideopsis laevithallina Lücking (2008)
- Gyalideopsis lambinonii Vězda (1979)
- Gyalideopsis lobulata Lücking (2008)
- Gyalideopsis lunata H.Harada (2011)
- Gyalideopsis macarthurii Lücking, L.Umaña & Aptroot (2006)
- Gyalideopsis marcellii Xavier-Leite, M.Cáceres & Lücking (2018)
- Gyalideopsis moodyae Lendemer & Lücking (2004)
- Gyalideopsis muscicola P.James & Vězda (1972)
- Gyalideopsis ozarkensis Lücking, W.R.Buck & R.C.Harris (2007)
- Gyalideopsis pallescens Lücking (2008)
- Gyalideopsis peruviana G.Merr. ex Vězda (1972)
- Gyalideopsis pseudoactinoplaca Lücking & Chaves (2006)
- Gyalideopsis puertoricensis Sipman & Lücking (2005)
- Gyalideopsis pusilla Lücking & Tønsberg (2016)
- Gyalideopsis rogersii Vězda & Hafellner (1988)
- Gyalideopsis rubescens Vězda (1979)
- Gyalideopsis scotica P.James (1975)
- Gyalideopsis sessilis W.B.Sanders & Lücking (2015)
- Gyalideopsis subaequatoriana Lücking & W.R.Buck (2007)
- Gyalideopsis submonospora Lücking & W.R.Buck (2007)
- Gyalideopsis tuerkii Vězda (2003)
- Gyalideopsis usneicola Etayo (2017)
- Gyalideopsis vainioi Kalb & Vězda (1988) – Brazil
- Gyalideopsis verruculosa Vězda & Hafellner (1991)
- Gyalideopsis vulgaris (Müll.Arg.) Lücking (1997)
- Gyalideopsis wesselsii Lücking, Sipman & Chaves (2006)
- Gyalideopsis williamsii Kalb & Vězda (1994)
- Gyalideopsis wirthii Kalb & Vězda (1994)
