= Hitoy Cerere Biological Reserve =

Protected area in Costa Rica

- Reserva Biológica Hitoy Cerere
- IUCN category Ia (strict nature reserve)
- Location within Costa Rica
- Location: Costa Rica
- Coordinates: 9.643°N 83.081°W
- Area: 99.78 square kilometres (38.53 sq mi)
- Established: 27 April 1971
- Governing body: National System of Conservation Areas (SINAC)

Hitoy Cerere Biological Reserve (Spanish: Reserva Biológica Hitoy Cerere), is a protected area in Costa Rica, managed under the Caribbean La Amistad Conservation Area, it was created in 1971 by decree 8351-J.
