= Jamesiella scotica =

Scientific classification
- Domain: Eukaryota
- Kingdom: Fungi
- Division: Ascomycota
- Class: Lecanoromycetes
- Order: Graphidales
- Family: Gomphillaceae
- Genus: Jamesiella
- Species: J. scotica

Binomial name
- Jamesiella scotica (P. James) Lücking, Sérus. & Vêzda

Synonyms
- Gyalideopsis scotica P. James (1975)

Species of fungus

Jamesiella scotica is a species of lichen thought to be endemic to the United Kingdom and Ireland. In the UK, it occurs in montane habitats in England, Wales and Scotland at heights of over 200 metres, thriving on decomposing bryophytes (such as Marsupella emarginata) on base-rich soils.

== Distribution and conservation ==
The species is classified as near threatened in the UK and receives protection under the Wildlife and Countryside Act 1981. It is found in the Cairngorm mountains of Scotland and on Ben Alder, Ben Hope and Ben Lawers elsewhere in the Highlands.

It is known from three sites in Wales – Cwm Idwal, Cwm Glas Mawr and Llyn Glas – and one site in Cumbria, in England. In Ireland, it is found on metamorphosed limestone in County Donegal.

== Description ==
Jamesiella scotica is a crustose lichen with a varnish-like thallus that grows to a diameter of 1.5 cm.
