= Tricharia =

Scientific classification
- Kingdom: Fungi
- Division: Ascomycota
- Class: Lecanoromycetes
- Order: Graphidales
- Family: Gomphillaceae
- Genus: Tricharia; Fée (1825)

Type species
- Tricharia melanothrix Fée (1825)

Synonyms
- Microxyphiomyces Bat., Valle & Peres (1961); Psathyromyces Bat. & Peres (1964)

Genus of lichen-forming fungi

Tricharia is a genus of lichens in the family Gomphillaceae. It has an estimated 30 species.

== Taxonomy ==
Recent molecular studies have shown that the long, carbon-black bristles (sterile setae) that once united many species under Tricharia evolved several times independently within the family. A two-gene phylogeny published in 2024 confirmed that the type lineage of Tricharia (species with pale, thin-walled apothecial rims) forms a well-supported clade distinct from three other "black-setae" groups that had been bundled together on the basis of bristle morphology. In particular, the Costa Rican species Tricharia paradoxa—long treated as an odd member of the genus—was transferred to the monospecific genus Paratricharia and shown to be sister to Caleniopsis in the early-diverging Aulaxina clade, far removed from Tricharia in the strict sense. The same analysis placed the remaining black-setae taxa in the separate genera Microxyphiomyces and Santricharia, confirming that bristles alone are a poor guide to deep relationships, whereas apothecial structure carries stronger phylogenetic signal.

A world-wide phylogeny released in 2025, which sampled more than 500 representatives of the Gomphillaceae, corroborated this arrangement and predicted that Tricharia in the strict sense may harbour additional cryptic species yet to be recognised. That study divided the family into at least five major lineages—each dominated by leaf-dwelling taxa—and estimated that the true diversity of Tricharia could exceed the roughly 30 currently accepted species once unsequenced material from Africa and South-East Asia is examined.

== Species ==
- Tricharia atrocarpa Lücking & Sipman (2005)
- Tricharia aulaxiniformis Lücking & Kalb (2000) – Brazil
- Tricharia carnea (Müll.Arg.) R.Sant. (1952)
- Tricharia duotela W.B.Sanders & Lücking (2015) – Florida
- Tricharia floridensis Lücking & W.R.Buck (2007)
- Tricharia longispora Kalb & Vězda (1988)
- Tricharia membranula (Müll.Arg.) Lücking (1995)
- Tricharia nigriuncinata Yeshitela, Eb.Fisch., Killmann & Sérus. (2011) – East Africa
- Tricharia novoguineensis Sérus. (1984) – New Guinea
- Tricharia oaxacae Herrera-Camp. & Lücking (2003) – Mexico
- Tricharia ochroleuca (Sacc.) Boud. (1904)
- Tricharia paraguayensis (L.I.Ferraro & Lücking) Lücking (2008)
- Tricharia pseudosantessonii Lücking (1997) – Costa Rica
- Tricharia quezelii Faurel & Schotter (1958)
- Tricharia sipmanii Lücking (2008) – Colombia
- Tricharia sublancicarpa Herrera-Camp. & Lücking (2002) – Mexico
- Tricharia subumbrosa Lücking & W.R.Buck (2007) – British Columbia, Canada
- Tricharia triseptata R.Sant. (1952)
- Tricharia tuckerae Lücking & W.R.Buck (2007) – Louisiana, USA
- Tricharia umbrosa Kalb & Vězda (1988)
- Tricharia urceolata (Müll.Arg.) R.Sant. (1952)
