= Gyalectidium laciniatum =

Scientific classification
- Kingdom: Fungi
- Division: Ascomycota
- Class: Lecanoromycetes
- Order: Graphidales
- Family: Gomphillaceae
- Genus: Gyalectidium
- Species: G. laciniatum

Binomial name
- Gyalectidium laciniatum Lücking (2001)
- Holotype: Orosi Valley, Cartago Province, Costa Rica

Species of lichen-forming fungus

Gyalectidium laciniatum is a species of lichen in the family Gomphillaceae. It is a leaf-dwelling lichen known from Central and South America, including Costa Rica, Bolivia, and Brazil. The species is characterized by its distinctive irregularly fringed or cut reproductive structures that arise from crescent-shaped whitish crystalline bulges on the thallus surface, giving it an intermediate appearance between related species with simpler and more elaborate scale forms.

== Taxonomy ==
Gyalectidium laciniatum was described as a new species in 2001 by Robert Lücking. In the original account it was discussed as intermediate between Gyalectidium verruculosum and G. eskuchei, combining a crescent-shaped crystalline bulge at the base of the hyphophore scale (as in the former) with a more dissected, irregular scale form that approaches the "setose" appearance seen in the latter.

== Description ==
The thallus forms rounded patches about 2–5 mm in diameter. It is finely verrucose and greenish to greenish gray.

Hyphophores (asexual reproductive structures) are produced on the thallus surface. Their scales are well developed and are usually borne from a crescent-shaped, whitish crystalline bulge. The scales are obliquely oriented and laciniate (irregularly cut or fringed) or bear irregular lateral projections. They measure about 0.15–0.25 mm long and 0.2–0.3 mm broad, and are whitish translucent, sometimes slightly orange. The visible surface of the diahyphal mass (the underlying reproductive tissue) is greenish. Apothecia and pycnidia have not been reported for this species.

== Habitat and distribution ==
Ferraro and colleagues reported Gyalectidium laciniatum only from the type collection in Costa Rica (Cartago Province, Orosi Valley). It was collected on leaves of trees along a road, and the authors therefore described it as occurring in relatively disturbed vegetation. They also noted that Gyalectidium denticulatum was found in the same collection. Gyalectidium laciniatum has since been reported from Bolivia and Brazil.
