= Gyalectidium kenyanum =

Scientific classification
- Kingdom: Fungi
- Division: Ascomycota
- Class: Lecanoromycetes
- Order: Graphidales
- Family: Gomphillaceae
- Genus: Gyalectidium
- Species: G. kenyanum

Binomial name
- Gyalectidium kenyanum Lücking & Kalb (2001)
- Type locality: Ol Donyo Sabuk east of Thika, Kenya

Species of lichen-forming fungus

Gyalectidium kenyanum is a species of lichen in the family Gomphillaceae. It is a leaf-dwelling lichen known only from montane rainforest in Kenya, where it was discovered at about 2,100 metres elevation. The species is distinguished by its unusual reproductive structures that form small crater-like depressions with a ring of narrow, bristle-like segments pointing inward around greyish fungal tissue, a feature it shares only with the Central American species Gyalectidium denticulatum.

== Taxonomy ==
Gyalectidium kenyanum was described as a new species in 2001 by Robert Lücking and Klaus Kalb. In the original treatment it was compared with Gyalectidium denticulatum, since both species share the same unusual hyphophore type: a crater-like depression with a ring of narrow segments arranged around the diahyphal mass. G. kenyanum was separated by its smaller thallus, fewer hyphophores per thallus patch, longer scale segments that often cover the diahyphal mass, and by the greyish (rather than green) colour of the diahyphal mass.

== Description ==
The thallus forms rounded patches about 1–3 mm across. The thallus comprises small, blister-like segments (areolate-bullate) and is heavily covered with a continuous layer of crystals, giving it a silvery to whitish-grey appearance.

Hyphophores (asexual reproductive structures) are produced on the thallus surface and are immersed in it; usually 1–3 occur per thallus patch. Each hyphophore forms a small, rounded depression about 0.15–0.2 mm in diameter. From the rim of the depression, the hyphophore "scale" is divided into narrowly triangular to bristle-like segments that point inward toward the centre; the segments are about 0.1–0.2 mm long and 10–20 μm broad. The segments are whitish, and the diahyphal mass (the underlying reproductive fungal tissue) is greyish. Apothecia (fruiting bodies) are rare but present. They are angular-rounded, about 0.15–0.25 mm in diameter, with a pale yellowish-brown to greyish disc that can be thinly pruinose and a whitish margin. The ascospores are oblong-ellipsoid, measuring 30–50×10–15 μm. Pycnidia were not reported.

== Habitat and distribution ==
This species is known only from the type locality in Kenya, where it was collected in montane rainforest at about 2,100 m elevation. It was reported from the same locality as Gyalectidium atrosquamulatum. In a 2002 survey of leaf-dwelling lichens in Kenya, Gyalectidium kenyanum was one of six Gyalectidium species known to occur in the country.
