= Gyalectidium floridense =

Conservation status
- Imperiled (NatureServe)

Scientific classification
- Kingdom: Fungi
- Division: Ascomycota
- Class: Lecanoromycetes
- Order: Graphidales
- Family: Gomphillaceae
- Genus: Gyalectidium
- Species: G. floridense

Binomial name
- Gyalectidium floridense Safranek & Lücking (2005)

Species of lichen

Gyalectidium floridense is a species of foliicolous (leaf-dwelling), crustose lichen in the family Gomphillaceae. It is found in the southeastern United States, where it grows on the leaves of Citrus and palmetto.

== Taxonomy ==
It was formally described as a new species in 2005 by William Safranek and Robert Lücking. The type specimen was collected by the first author from a residential property in Brevard County, Florida, where it was found growing on the leaves of Citrus. It has also been recorded in Louisiana growing on palmetto leaves.

Gyalectidium floridense is in the Gyalectidium areolatum species group, which is in Gyalectidium section Areolectidium series Areolate. The primary characteristic of this particular group of species is the presence of a crystalline thallus; calcium oxalate crystals congregate and form large areoles on the patches of the thallus. Other eastern North American species with this thallus characteristic are G. tuckerae and G. appendiculatum.

== Description ==
The thallus of Gyalectidium floridense can be found on the surface of leaves, either on top (epiphyllous or underneath (hypophyllous, and is crustose in nature. The thallus is made up of small, rounded to irregular patches that are 0.8–1.5 mm in diameter and 20 μm thick. It has a cartilaginous, corticiform layer and appears greenish in color. The areoles, which are 0.4–0.8 mm in diameter, are encrusted with calcium oxalate crystals, making them silvery gray in color. Apothecia are not present in this species.

Hyphophores (highly derived conidiomata that are unique to the family Gomphillaceae), which are frequently found near the thallus margin along the edges of the areoles, are also present. They have scales that project vertically and appear horn-shaped when folded along their vertical axis. The hyphophores are 0.4–0.6 mm long and 70–90 μm wide when folded and are grayish to whitish in color.

The photobiont in Gyalectidium floridense is chlorococcoid, with cells that are 8–12 μm in diameter. The diahyphae in this lichen are branched throughout and moniliform in shape. The segments of the diahyphae are sausage-shaped, measuring 4–8 by 2–3 μm in size, and are colorless. Scattered algal cells that are 4–6 μm in diameter are also present.

The structural organization of the cystalline deposits and the thallus in this species has been examined using scanning electron microscopy. Clear continuity can be observed between the epilayer of the thallus in Gyalectidium floridense and the prothallus. Spaces, which may be occupied by crystalline deposits, are frequently visible between the epilayer and the remaining lower part of the thallus. In certain areas, the epilayer may exhibit discontinuities, especially in regions where it is raised by the purported crystal deposits located below.

=== Similar species ===
Gyalectidium floridense bears some resemblance to specific forms of G. catenulatum, which occurs in northern areas of Argentina. This particular species also features enrolled hyphophores, with similar horn-like shapes found in the populations from northern Argentina. However, the flattened-out hyphophores in G. catenulatum possess parallel sides with acute projections at their edges. Also, G. catenulatum differs from G. floridense in that its smooth thallus is not encrusted with crystals.

Gyalectidium plicatum, found in Chile and Mexico, appears to be the species that is most closely related to Gyalectidium floridense. While there are similarities between the two species, the hyphophores of G. plicatum are more irregularly folded, oblique, and submarginal in nature. The areoles of G. plicatum are also thicker and appear whitish in color, with the dominance of these crystalline structures covering most of the thallus.
