= Gyalectidium novoguineense =

Scientific classification
- Kingdom: Fungi
- Division: Ascomycota
- Class: Lecanoromycetes
- Order: Graphidales
- Family: Gomphillaceae
- Genus: Gyalectidium
- Species: G. novoguineense

Binomial name
- Gyalectidium novoguineense Sérusiaux (2001)
- Holotype: between Awar plantation and Boroi, Papua New Guinea

Species of lichen-forming fungus

Gyalectidium novoguineense is a species of lichen-forming fungus in the family Gomphillaceae. It is a leaf-dwelling lichen known from tropical and subtropical regions including Papua New Guinea, Australia, New Caledonia, Mexico, and Thailand, occurring in both natural rainforests and cultivated settings such as botanical gardens. The species is distinguished by its minute silvery to whitish-grey patches composed of small blister-like segments, with very narrowly triangular, almost bristle-like reproductive structures arranged horizontally at the thallus edges.

== Taxonomy ==
Gyalectidium novoguineense was described as a new species in 2001 by Emmanuël Sérusiaux. He treated it as part of a morphological series in section Placolectidium, ranging from the broadly flabelliform (fan-shaped) hyphophores of G. flabellatum to the cilia-like hyphophores of G. ciliatum. The species was distinguished by its very narrowly triangular, almost bristle-like hyphophore scales produced at the thallus edges.

== Description ==
The thallus forms minute, dispersed to confluent, irregular patches about 0.3–0.5 mm across, which together can form an aggregate up to about 5 mm across. The thallus is composed of small, blister-like segments (areolate-bullate) covered with crystals that create a silvery to whitish-grey appearance, sometimes with thin greenish zones visible at the margins.

Hyphophores (structures for asexual reproduction) are produced at the edges of the thallus. Their scales are small, horizontally arranged, and very narrowly triangular, measuring about 0.07–0.15 mm long and 20–50 μm broad at the base. The scales are whitish to pale grey. Apothecia (fruiting bodies) are rare, typically 1 (sometimes up to 3) per thallus patch. They are angular-rounded, about 0.2–0.3 mm in diameter, with a greyish to pale yellowish-brown disc and a slightly prominent whitish margin that typically bears a thin brownish line on its inner edge. The ascospores are ellipsoid to ovoid, measuring 40–50 × 20–30 μm. Pycnidia were not reported.

== Habitat and distribution ==
Ferraro and colleagues reported Gyalectidium novoguineense from low-elevation sites along the northern coast of Papua New Guinea, and also from south-west Australia and New Caledonia. The collections were from both natural rainforest and artificial habitats (including botanical garden material in Papua New Guinea). It has also been recorded from Mexico, and from Thailand.
