= Gyalectidium barbatum =

Scientific classification
- Kingdom: Fungi
- Division: Ascomycota
- Class: Lecanoromycetes
- Order: Graphidales
- Family: Gomphillaceae
- Genus: Gyalectidium
- Species: G. barbatum

Binomial name
- Gyalectidium barbatum Herrera‑Camp. & Lücking (2002)

Species of lichen-forming fungus

Gyalectidium barbatum is a foliicolous (leaf‑dwelling) crustose lichen in the family Gomphillaceae, described from specimens collected in Veracruz, Mexico. It is distinguished from related species by its hyphophores (minute asexual reproductive structures) and ascospore size range.

== Taxonomy ==
The species was described as new to science by María de los Ángeles Herrera-Campos and Robert Lücking in 2002 from material collected from the Los Tuxtlas Biosphere Reserve; the holotype is deposited at MEXU (voucher: Herrera‑Campos et al. 153). The original description emphasises diagnostic hyphophore morphology and spore dimensions separating it from others in Gyalectidium.

== Description ==
Gyalectidium barbatum is a leaf-dwelling crust that grows on the upper surface of living leaves, forming tiny whitish to silvery-gray patches. The thallus is slightly swollen in appearance because it is encrusted with calcium oxalate crystals; individual patches are about 0.5–1 mm wide. The photosynthetic partner (photobiont) is a green alga in the genus Trebouxia, with roughly spherical cells measuring about 5–8 μm in diameter.

The species is characterized by abundant marginal hyphophores (asexual reproductive structures). These are horizontal, closely appressed, broadly triangular to irregularly cut (giving a "shaggy" outline), and translucent overall but darker near the base. Each scale is about 0.05–0.15 mm long and about 0.15–0.3 mm wide at the base. Beneath the scale bases, the lichen produces a single "bunch" of short, bead-like (moniliform) hyphae that branch in a star-like pattern and are mixed with algal cells. The hyphal segments are roughly sausage-shaped, and measure about 4–7 × 1.8–2.2 μm. Apothecia appear to be uncommon (only one was reported), and it was said to resemble those of closely related species such as G. caucasicum and G. minus.

== Habitat and distribution ==
The type collection of Gyalectidium barbatum was made at the Los Tuxtlas Tropical Biology Station in Veracruz, Mexico, within the Los Tuxtlas Biosphere Reserve. The authors describe the area as tropical moist broadleaf forest (lowland rainforest), and the specimen was collected at about 150–250 m (490–820 ft) elevation. As of its original description, it was known only from the type locality in Veracruz.
