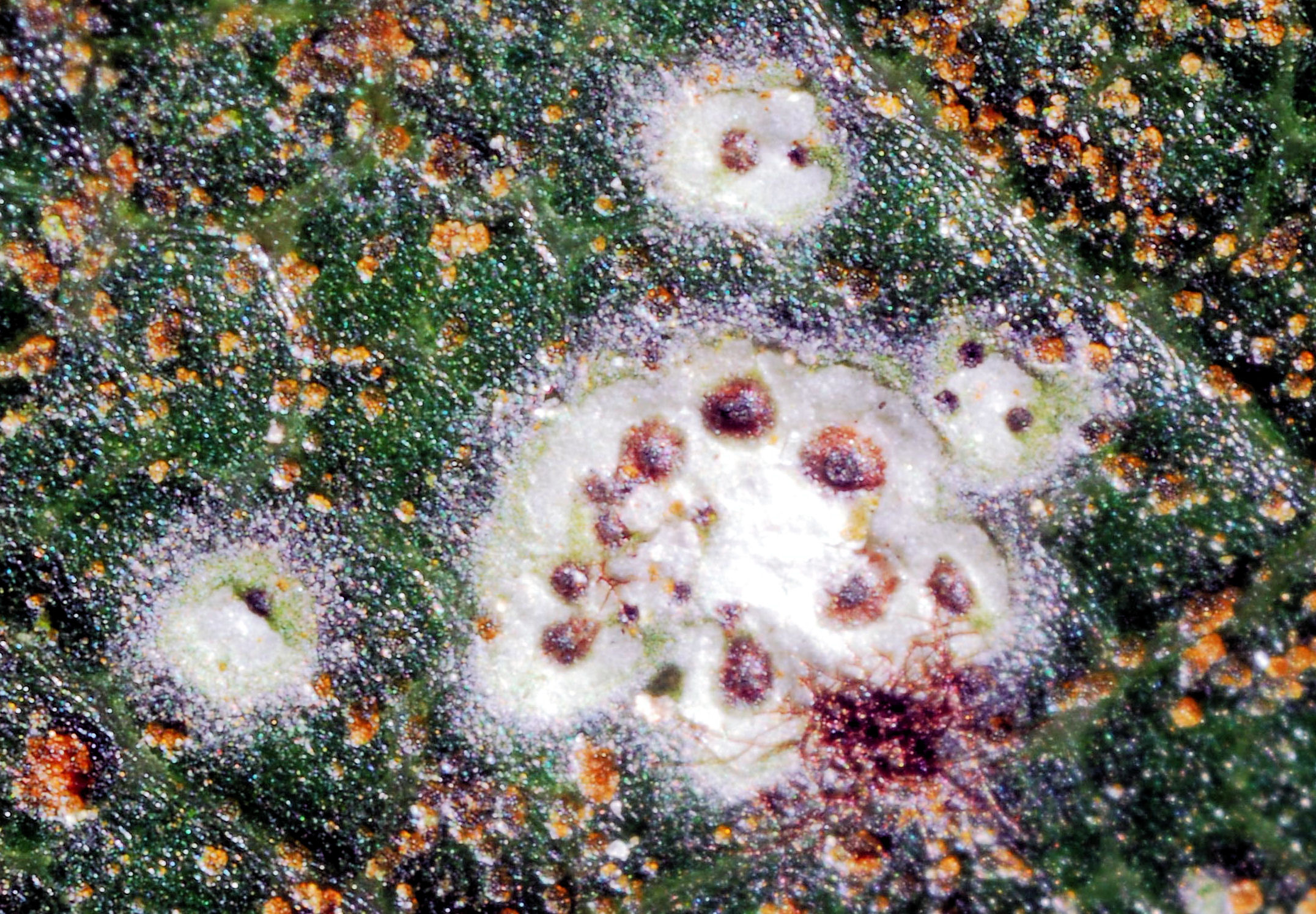
- Gyalectidium puntilloi

Scientific classification
- Kingdom: Fungi
- Division: Ascomycota
- Class: Lecanoromycetes
- Order: Graphidales
- Family: Gomphillaceae
- Genus: Gyalectidium; Müll.Arg. (1881)

Type species
- Gyalectidium filicinum Müll.Arg. (1881)

Species
- See text

Synonyms
- List: Gonothecis Clem. (1909); Gonothecium (Vain.) Clem. & Shear (1931); Lecidea sect. Gonothecium Vain. (1890); Lopadiopsidomyces Cif. & Tomas. (1953); Lopadiopsis Vain. (1896); Tauromyces Cavalc. & A.A.Silva (1972)

= Gyalectidium =

Genus of lichen-forming fungi

Gyalectidium is a genus of lichen-forming fungi in the family Gomphillaceae. Established in 1881 by Swiss lichenologist Johannes Müller Argoviensis, the genus comprises about 50 species of predominantly leaf-dwelling lichens that form small, pale greenish to whitish-grey patches typically only a few millimetres across. Members are characterised by specialised asexual reproductive structures called hyphophores, which are small scale-like outgrowths that produce propagules containing both fungal and algal partners, and by fruiting bodies that contain single, large, multi-chambered ascospores. The genus has a mainly pantropical to subtropical distribution with highest diversity in the Neotropics, occurring primarily on living leaves in humid tropical forests but also documented from temperate regions including Europe and parts of Australasia.

== Taxonomy ==
The genus was circumscribed by the Swiss lichenologist Johannes Müller Argoviensis in 1881. In the protologue, he characterised Gyalectidium as a crustose lichen with globose, green gonidia (green algae), lecanorine apothecia with a simple margin that is thalline externally, and paraphyses that are interconnected in a lattice. The spores were described as hyaline and "parenchymatous" (divided into many chambers). He distinguished the genus from Gyalecta by the structure of the paraphyses, and remarked that the species then known were foliicolous and had one-spored asci. He included 3 species: G. xantholeucum, G. dispersum, and G. filicinum; the last of these is now the type species of the genus.

In their 2001 monograph, Ferraro and colleagues proposed an infrageneric classification that organised the species treated there into sections and series, largely reflecting thallus texture (especially the distribution of calcium oxalate crystals) and the form and placement of the hyphophores. They recognised three main groupings as sections, each with a single series: sect. Placolectidium (ser. Caucasicae), comprising species with placoid to bullate thalli that are evenly encrusted with crystals and often form their hyphophores at the thallus margin; sect. Areolectidium (ser. Areolatae), including species with smoother thalli lacking crystals or with a distinctly areolate pattern, typically with well-developed hyphophore scales; and the autonymous sect. Gyalectidium (ser. Gyalectidium), centred on the G. filicinum group, characterised by a finely verrucose thallus in which crystals are aggregated into small wart-like patches and by a wide range of hyphophore forms. Two species that appeared isolated in their analysis were placed in monotypic sections and series: sect. Setolectidium (ser. Microcarpae) for G. microcarpum, which has abundant sterile setae and lacks hyphophores, and sect. Goniolectidium (ser. Yahriae) for G. yahriae, in which the hyphophores are modified into multi-part structures with a goniocystangium-like appearance.

== Description ==
Gyalectidium is a genus of mostly leaf-dwelling (foliicolous) crustose lichens that form small, pale greenish to whitish-grey patches, often only a few millimetres across (rarely approaching about 10 mm). The thallus is always corticate (i.e., it has a surface layer of fungal tissue), and it commonly carries colourless calcium oxalate crystals that give the surface a finely warty, coarsely verrucose, or sometimes distinctly areolate look; in a few species the thallus is smoother because crystals are sparse or absent. The photosynthetic partner is a green alga of the genus Trebouxia.

The genus is recognised by its specialised asexual structures called hyphophores: small, scale-like outgrowths that may stand upright, slant, or lie close to the thallus surface, and in some species are much reduced or missing. At the base (or centre) of each hyphophore a mass of short, branched hyphae (the diahyphal or "conidial" mass) develops; it is typically intermixed with algal cells and often breaks into smaller rounded propagules that can disperse both partners together. Sexual fruiting bodies (apothecia) are immersed in the thallus and have a thalline margin. Internally they have a colourless, non-amyloid hymenium with richly branched and interconnected paraphyses, and asci that usually contain a single, colourless ascospore. The ascospore is muriform (divided by both transverse and longitudinal septa into many chambers). Pycnidia are uncommon in the genus.

== Habitat and distribution ==
Most Gyalectidium species are best known as foliicolous lichens, forming tiny crusts on living leaves in humid climates. In the 2001 world monograph, the genus was reported most often from tropical forests, where at least some species can occur across a wide range of light conditions—from shaded understory leaves to more exposed leaves in the canopy. Records discussed there also suggest that some Gyalectidium lichens can colonise very young leaves early in succession (behaving as pioneer colonists), yet remain present on older leaves later in the life of the leaf. Several species may be found together on the same leaf, which implies broadly similar microhabitat requirements within a site.

As treated in that monograph, Gyalectidium had a mainly pantropical to subtropical distribution overall, with the highest recorded diversity in the Neotropics (especially areas that had been intensively collected), and additional species documented from tropical Africa, Europe (including the Caucasus and Macaronesia), and Australasia. The authors stressed that broad patterns were still hard to generalise, because many species were known from few collections and some regions (especially tropical Asia) appeared undercollected at the time. Even within better-sampled areas, the monograph suggests some ecological separation: certain species were reported more often from open or canopy situations, while others were more frequently detected in secondary vegetation. Although the genus was treated as overwhelmingly leaf-dwelling, the monograph also recorded a small number of exceptions, including a species occurring on twigs/decorticated wood, and an occasional streamside-rock record.

== Species ==
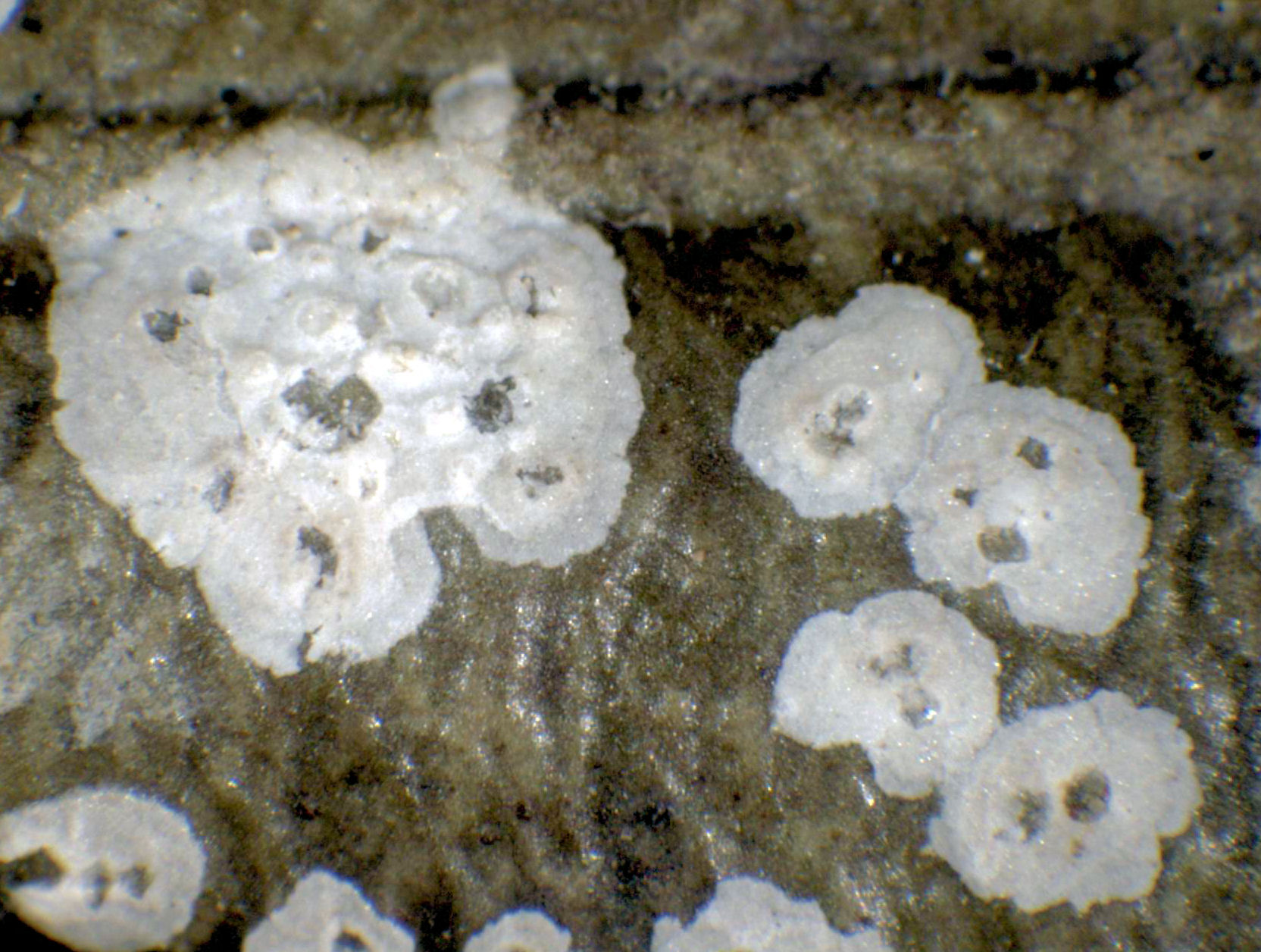
Gyalectidium minus

As of February 2026, Species Fungorum (in the Catalogue of Life) accept 46 species of Gyalectidium.

- Gyalectidium appendiculatum Lücking, Lendemer & E.A.Tripp (2008)
- Gyalectidium areolatum L.I.Ferraro & Lücking (2001)
- Gyalectidium atrosquamulatum Lücking & Kalb (2001)
- Gyalectidium aurelii L.I.Ferraro & Lücking (2003)
- Gyalectidium australe Lücking (2001)
- Gyalectidium barbatum Herrera-Camp. & Lücking (2002) – Mexico
- Gyalectidium catenulatum (Cavalc. & A.A.Silva) L.I.Ferraro, Lücking & Sérus. (2000)
- Gyalectidium caucasicum (Elenkin & Woron.) Vězda (1983)
- Gyalectidium chilense M.Cáceres & Lücking (2003)
- Gyalectidium ciliatum Lücking, G.Thor & Tat. Matsumoto (2000)
- Gyalectidium cinereodiscus Herrera-Camp. & Lücking (2004)
- Gyalectidium conchiferum Lücking & V.Wirth (2001)
- Gyalectidium denticulatum Lücking (2001)
- Gyalectidium fantasticum L.I.Ferraro & Lücking (2001)
- Gyalectidium filicinum Müll.Arg. (1881)
- Gyalectidium flabellatum Sérus. (2001)
- Gyalectidium floridense Safranek & Lücking (2005) – Florida, USA
- Gyalectidium fuscum Lücking & Sérus. (2001)
- Gyalectidium gahavisukanam Sérus. (2001)
- Gyalectidium imperfectum Vězda (1994)
- Gyalectidium kenyanum Lücking & Kalb (2001)
- Gyalectidium laciniatum Lücking (2001)
- Gyalectidium macaronesicum Sérus. (2000)
- Gyalectidium maracae Lücking (2001)
- Gyalectidium membranaceum Sérus. & Lücking (2001)
- Gyalectidium microcarpum (Vězda) Lücking, Sérus. & Vězda (2001)
- Gyalectidium minus Sérus. (2001)
- Gyalectidium nashii Herrera-Camp. & Lücking (2003)
- Gyalectidium novoguineense Sérus. (2001)
- Gyalectidium pallidum Herrera-Camp. & Lücking (2002)
- Gyalectidium paolae Herrera-Camp. & Lücking (2003)
- Gyalectidium plicatum L.I.Ferraro & Lücking (2003)
- Gyalectidium puntilloi Sérus. (2001)
- Gyalectidium radiatum Lücking, G.Thor & Tat.Matsumoto (2000)
- Gyalectidium rosae-emiliae Herrera-Camp. & Lücking (2003)
- Gyalectidium sanmartinense Herrera-Camp. & Lücking (2004)
- Gyalectidium shimanense Y.Suto (2018) – Japan
- Gyalectidium tuckerae Lücking & Lendemer (2007) – Louisiana, USA
- Gyalectidium ulloae Herrera-Camp. & Lücking (2002) – Mexico
- Gyalectidium verruculosum Sérus. (2001)
- Gyalectidium viride Lücking, W.R.Buck & Rivas Plata (2007) – Alabama, USA
- Gyalectidium yahriae W.R.Buck & Sérus. (2000) – Florida, USA
