= Gyalectidium fuscum =

Scientific classification
- Kingdom: Fungi
- Division: Ascomycota
- Class: Lecanoromycetes
- Order: Graphidales
- Family: Gomphillaceae
- Genus: Gyalectidium
- Species: G. fuscum

Binomial name
- Gyalectidium fuscum Lücking & Sérus. (2001)
- Type locality: Mt Gahavisuka Provincial Park, Papua New Guinea

Species of lichen-forming fungus

Gyalectidium fuscum is a species of lichen-forming fungus in the family Gomphillaceae. It is a leaf-dwelling lichen known from tropical montane regions, including Papua New Guinea, tropical Africa (Burundi and the Democratic Republic of the Congo), and northeastern Brazil. The species is distinguished by its distinctive brown-pigmented fruiting bodies, which are initially covered by a thin brown layer and later retain a reddish-brown zone at maturity, separating it from the closely related Gyalectidium filicinum.

== Taxonomy ==
Gyalectidium fuscum was described as a new species in 2001 by Robert Lücking and Emmanuël Sérusiaux. In the original account it was treated as closely related to Gyalectidium filicinum but distinguished by the pigmentation of its apothecia (fruiting bodies), which are covered by a brown layer when young and later retain a brown to reddish-brown zone at maturity.

== Description ==
The thallus forms rounded patches on leaf surfaces, and are either single or clustered and about 1–2 mm in diameter. It is finely verrucose and greenish to greyish in colour.

Hyphophores (asexual reproductive structures) are rare and occur on the thallus surface. Their scales are well developed and obliquely oriented, squamiform, and typically bear two acute lateral projections. The scales are about 0.3–0.5 mm long and 0.2–0.4 mm broad, and are whitish to pale greenish grey. Apothecia are rounded, typically 1–4 (sometimes up to 10) per thallus patch, and about 0.2–0.3 mm in diameter. The disc is initially covered by a thin brown layer; in mature apothecia this becomes reduced to a narrow reddish-brown zone. A distinctly raised brown margin surrounds the disc, occasionally developing small whitish verrucae where crystals have accumulated beneath the surface. Ascospores are ellipsoid, 35–45 × 14–20 μm. Pycnidia have not been reported.

== Habitat and distribution ==
Gyalectidium fuscum was initially documented from the mountains of Papua New Guinea and from several localities in tropical Africa (Burundi and the Democratic Republic of the Congo). It has since been recorded from Serra da Guia in northeastern Brazil.
