= Gyalectidium fantasticum =

Scientific classification
- Kingdom: Fungi
- Division: Ascomycota
- Class: Lecanoromycetes
- Order: Graphidales
- Family: Gomphillaceae
- Genus: Gyalectidium
- Species: G. fantasticum

Binomial name
- Gyalectidium fantasticum Ferraro & Lücking (2001)
- Type locality: Canendiyú, Paraguay

Species of lichen-forming fungus

Gyalectidium fantasticum is a species of lichen-forming fungus in the family Gomphillaceae. It is a leaf-dwelling lichen known from widely separated locations in tropical America, including Paraguay and Costa Rica. The species is distinguished by its unusually broad, flat reproductive structures that lie pressed against the thallus surface and are considerably wider than they are long, with a distinctive color pattern that grades from dark grayish-brown at the base to whitish-translucent above.

== Taxonomy ==
Gyalectidium fantasticum was described as a new species in 2001 by Lidia Ferraro and Robert Lücking. The type was collected from the Itabo Private Reserve near Colonia Nueva Esperanza (Canendiyu, Paraguay) at an elevation of 260 m (850 ft). In the original account, it was set apart from other members of the genus by its unusually broad, adnate hyphophores (asexual reproductive structures), which are only slightly raised above the thallus surface.

== Description ==
The thallus forms rounded to irregular patches about 1–2 mm across. It is areolate, with whitish, flattened, polygonal crystalline clusters in the center surrounded by thin greenish parts of the thallus; in some thalli it is described as almost smooth.

Hyphophores are positioned at the edges of the thallus. Their scales are well developed, lying flat against the thallus surface, and are very broadly squamiform to almost lunulate (ranging from broadly scale-like to crescent-shaped), usually with two short projections on the sides. The scales are about 0.1–0.2 mm long and 0.7–1.2 mm broad, dark greyish brown to almost black at the base and whitish translucent above. Apothecia and pycnidia have not been reported for this species.

== Habitat and distribution ==
Ferraro and colleagues reported Gyalectidium fantasticum from two widely separated localities in tropical America. The type is from eastern Paraguay (Itabo Private Reserve), and an additional specimen was cited from Costa Rica (Tapantí National Park).
