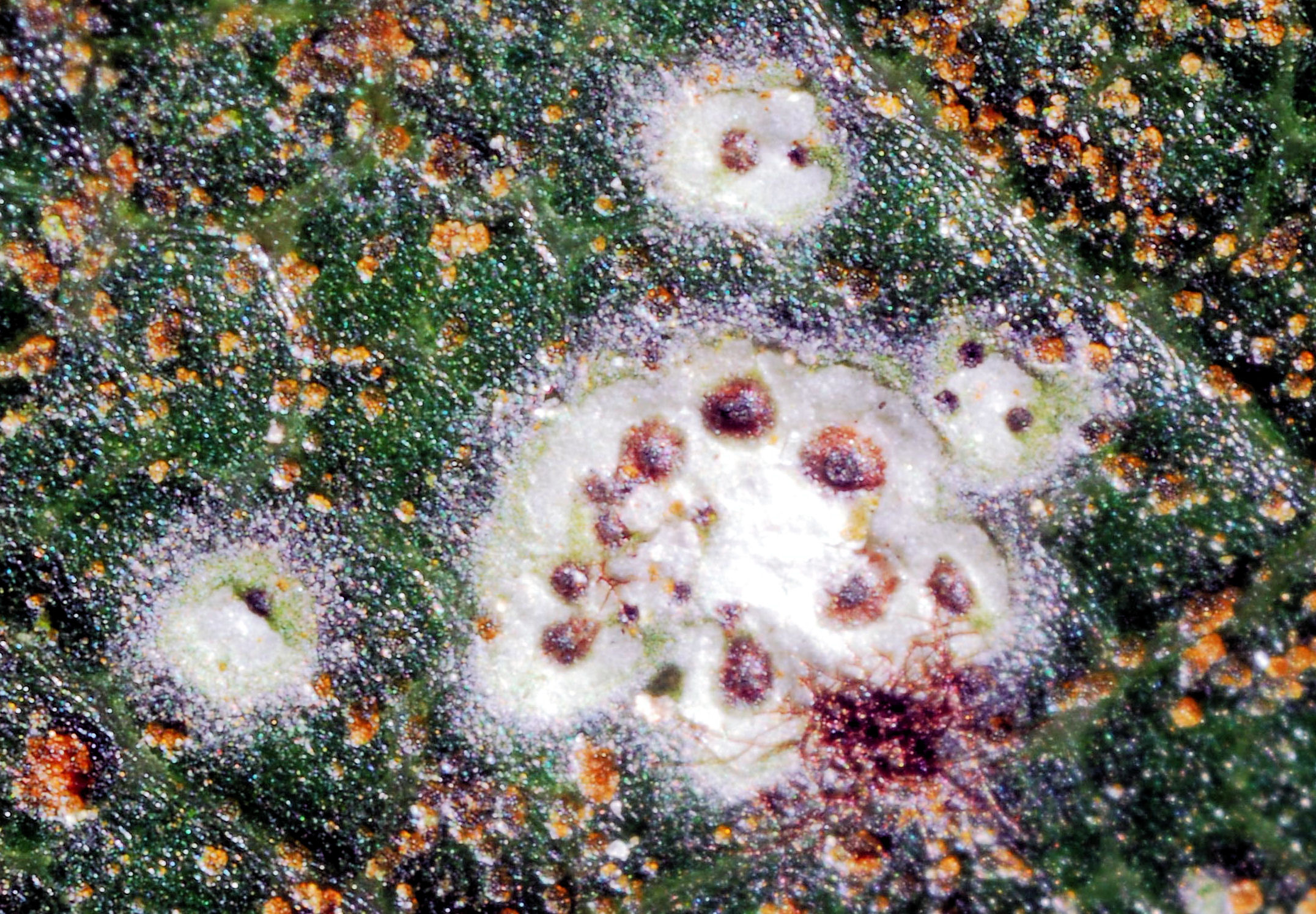

Scientific classification
- Kingdom: Fungi
- Division: Ascomycota
- Class: Lecanoromycetes
- Order: Graphidales
- Family: Gomphillaceae
- Genus: Gyalectidium
- Species: G. puntilloi

Binomial name
- Gyalectidium puntilloi Sérusiaux (2001)

= Gyalectidium puntilloi =

Species of lichen-forming fungus

Gyalectidium puntilloi is a species of lichen-forming fungus in the family Gomphillaceae. It is a leaf-dwelling lichen known from southern Europe, including the Pyrenees and southern Italy, where it grows on boxwood, ivy, and bay laurel in humid valleys. The species is distinguished by its distinctly segmented thallus consisting of whitish polygonal crystalline clusters separated by thin greenish zones, with small twisted scales bearing irregular fringe-like edges developing from the outer margins of these segments.

== Taxonomy ==
Gyalectidium puntilloi was described as a new species in 2001 by the Belgian lichenologist Emmanuël Sérusiaux. He treated it as the European counterpart of the neotropical spoecies Gyalectidium areolatum, sharing a strongly areolate thallus with large whitish crystalline areoles separated by green, crystal-free parts, but differing clearly in hyphophore form. The species was named for Domenico Puntillo, who collected and provided extensive material from southern Italy.

== Description ==
The thallus forms rounded to irregular patches about 1–3 mm across and is distinctly areolate, with whitish, flattened, polygonal crystalline clusters separated or surrounded by thin greenish thallus parts.

Hyphophores (structure for asexual reproduction) are located near the edges of the margins. Small scales develop from the outer edges of the crystalline segments. The scales are angled, squamiform (scale-shaped), and usually twisted with irregularly laciniate (fringed or cut) margins. The scales measure about 0.05–0.08 mm long and 0.07–0.15 mm broad, and are pale greyish or whitish, sometimes with a bluish tinge at the base. Apothecia (fruiting bodies) are very rare, rounded, about 0.1–0.25 mm in diameter, with a pale or brownish disc and a prominent whitish to grey margin. Ascospores were not observed, and pycnidia were not reported.

== Habitat and distribution ==
Ferraro and colleagues reported Gyalectidium puntilloi as restricted to Europe, known from both sides of the Pyrenees (France and Spain) and from southern Italy (Campania). In the Pyrenees it grows on leaves of Buxus sempervirens and can be locally abundant in small, very humid valleys on the northern side of the range, while in Italy it was reported from a single locality where it is abundant on leaves of Hedera helix and Laurus nobilis. It has been included in the red list of Italian epiphytic lichens as "critically endangered".

In Italy it was noted as often attacked by the lichenicolous (lichen-dwelling) hyphomycete Hansfordiellopsis lichenicola, which can affect the condition of the thallus.
