= Gyalectidium conchiferum =

Scientific classification
- Kingdom: Fungi
- Division: Ascomycota
- Class: Lecanoromycetes
- Order: Graphidales
- Family: Gomphillaceae
- Genus: Gyalectidium
- Species: G. conchiferum

Binomial name
- Gyalectidium conchiferum Lücking & V.Wirth (2001)

Species of lichen-forming fungus

Gyalectidium conchiferum is a leaf-dwelling (foliicolous) species of lichen-forming fungus in the family Gomphillaceae. It is known from the Valdivian temperate rainforest of southern Chile, where it forms small greenish-gray patches on living leaves. The species is characterized by its distinctive mussel-shaped reproductive structures that stand upright at the thallus margin, which distinguish it from similar smooth-thallusеd species in the genus.

== Taxonomy ==
Gyalectidium conchiferum was described as a new species in 2001 by Robert Lücking and Volkmar Wirth, based on material collected in southern Chile. The type was collected from Volcan El Mocho near Choshuenco, about 100 km (62 mi) east of Valdivia at an elevation of 600–630 m (1,970–2,070 ft). In the original account it was compared with Gyalectidium catenulatum, which has a similar smooth thallus, but differs in the shape and placement of the hyphophores (specialized, often stalked structures that produce asexual fungal filaments).

== Description ==
The thallus (the main body of the lichen) forms rounded patches about 1–5 mm across. It is smooth and lacks crystals, and is greenish gray to green.

Hyphophores are produced at the margin of the thallus. Their scales are well developed and stand upright; they are squamiform and described as mussel-shaped, because the base bends inward toward the thallus edge. The scale margin is entire and rounded, and the scales measure about 0.2–0.4 mm long by 0.3–0.4 mm wide; they are whitish in colour. Apothecia and pycnidia have not been reported for this species.

== Habitat and distribution ==
Gyalectidium conchiferum has been reported from the Valdivian temperate rainforest of southern Chile, where it grows on living leaves.
