= Gyalectidium membranaceum =

Scientific classification
- Kingdom: Fungi
- Division: Ascomycota
- Class: Lecanoromycetes
- Order: Graphidales
- Family: Gomphillaceae
- Genus: Gyalectidium
- Species: G. membranaceum

Binomial name
- Gyalectidium membranaceum Sérusiaux & Lücking (2001)

Species of lichen-forming fungus

Gyalectidium membranaceum is a species of lichen-forming fungus in the family Gomphillaceae. It is a tiny, foliicolous (leaf-dwelling) lichen known only from cloud forest on the island of La Palma in the Canary Islands. The species is distinguished by its unusual bluish, membrane-like reproductive structures, and no sexual fruiting bodies have been observed.

== Taxonomy ==
Gyalectidium membranaceum was described as a new species in 2001 by Emmanuël Sérusiaux and Robert Lücking. In the original account, it was characterized by its thin, meagre thallus and by hyphophores (asexual reproductive structures) reduced to a bluish, membrane-like layer that covers a mass of conidial spores (diahyphae).

The species was compared with Gyalectidium imperfectum, which also has hyphophores reduced to adnate spots. G. membranaceum differs by having much thinner, more membrane-like hyphophores and a thallus that is distinctly cracked into small patches (areolate) rather than finely warty (verrucose). The authors suggested that the membranaceous layer together with the diahyphal mass functions as a single dispersal unit, since many thalli have strongly scalloped (crenate) margins where these structures appear to have been removed as a whole.

== Description ==
The thallus forms very small, rounded to crenate, rather ill-developed patches about 0.05–0.1 mm in diameter. It is indistinctly areolate, with a whitish, flattened crystalline cluster at the centre surrounded by a thin greenish-grey marginal zone.

The hyphophores are located at the thallus margins but lack the scale-like covering typical of the genus. Instead, each is reduced to a small spot of spore-producing tissue (the diahyphal mass), covered by a thin, pale bluish-grey membrane about 0.07–0.1 mm in diameter. Apothecia and pycnidia have not been reported for this species.

== Habitat and distribution ==
Gyalectidium membranaceum is known only from the island of La Palma (Canary Islands). The type locality was described as a remnant of evergreen, subtropical cloud forest, and the species was reported as very rare there, found on only a few leaves.

In that locality it was observed as a pioneer on young leaves of Lauraceae, occurring together with Gyalectidium colchicum.
