= Gyalectidium flabellatum =

Scientific classification
- Kingdom: Fungi
- Division: Ascomycota
- Class: Lecanoromycetes
- Order: Graphidales
- Family: Gomphillaceae
- Genus: Gyalectidium
- Species: G. flabellatum

Binomial name
- Gyalectidium flabellatum Sérus. (2001)
- Type locality: Brahman Mission, Papua New Guinea

Species of lichen-forming fungus

Gyalectidium flabellatum is a species of lichen-forming fungus in the family Gomphillaceae. It is a leaf-dwelling lichen known from Papua New Guinea and Queensland, Australia, where it grows in lowland to montane forests. The species is distinguished by its characteristic fan-shaped reproductive structures that are broadest around the middle rather than at the base, a feature that separates it from other members of the genus with similarly crystalline thalli.

== Taxonomy ==
Gyalectidium flabellatum was described as a new species in 2001 by Emmanuël Sérusiaux. The type was collected from the south side of Ramu River in Brahman Mission (Madang Province, Papua New Guinea), at an elevation of 100 m. It is distinguished by the characteristic form of its hyphophores (asexual reproductive structures): when well developed, the scales are flabelliform (fan-shaped) and typically reach their greatest breadth around the middle rather than at the base.

== Description ==
The thallus forms patches about 1–3 mm across that are angular-rounded to almost lobulate-crenate (with small lobes and scalloped edges). The thallus is composed of small, blister-like segments (areolate-bullate) and is heavily covered with a continuous layer of crystals, giving it a silvery to whitish-grey appearance. Thin greenish thallus parts may be present at the edges.

Hyphophores occur at the thallus edges or close to it. Their scales are well developed but can be difficult to see, emerging from a low bulge and lying horizontally. The scales are broadly fan-shaped and have a slightly dentate upper margin. They are typically broadest around mid-height, and measure about 0.1–0.2 mm long and 0.2–0.3 mm broad. Its colour is whitish translucent to bluish grey. Apothecia are angular-rounded, about 0.2–0.3 mm in diameter, with a pale yellowish-brown to greyish disc that can be thinly pruinose, and a prominent whitish margin. Ascospores are ellipsoid, with dimensions of 30–45 × 10–17 μm. Pycnidia were not reported.

== Habitat and distribution ==
Gyalectidium flabellatum was initially reported from two localities: one along the northern coast of Papua New Guinea and one in Queensland, Australia. In Papua New Guinea it occurred together with Gyalectidium caucasicum and G. verruculosum, while in Queensland it was found with G. australe and G. verruculosum.
