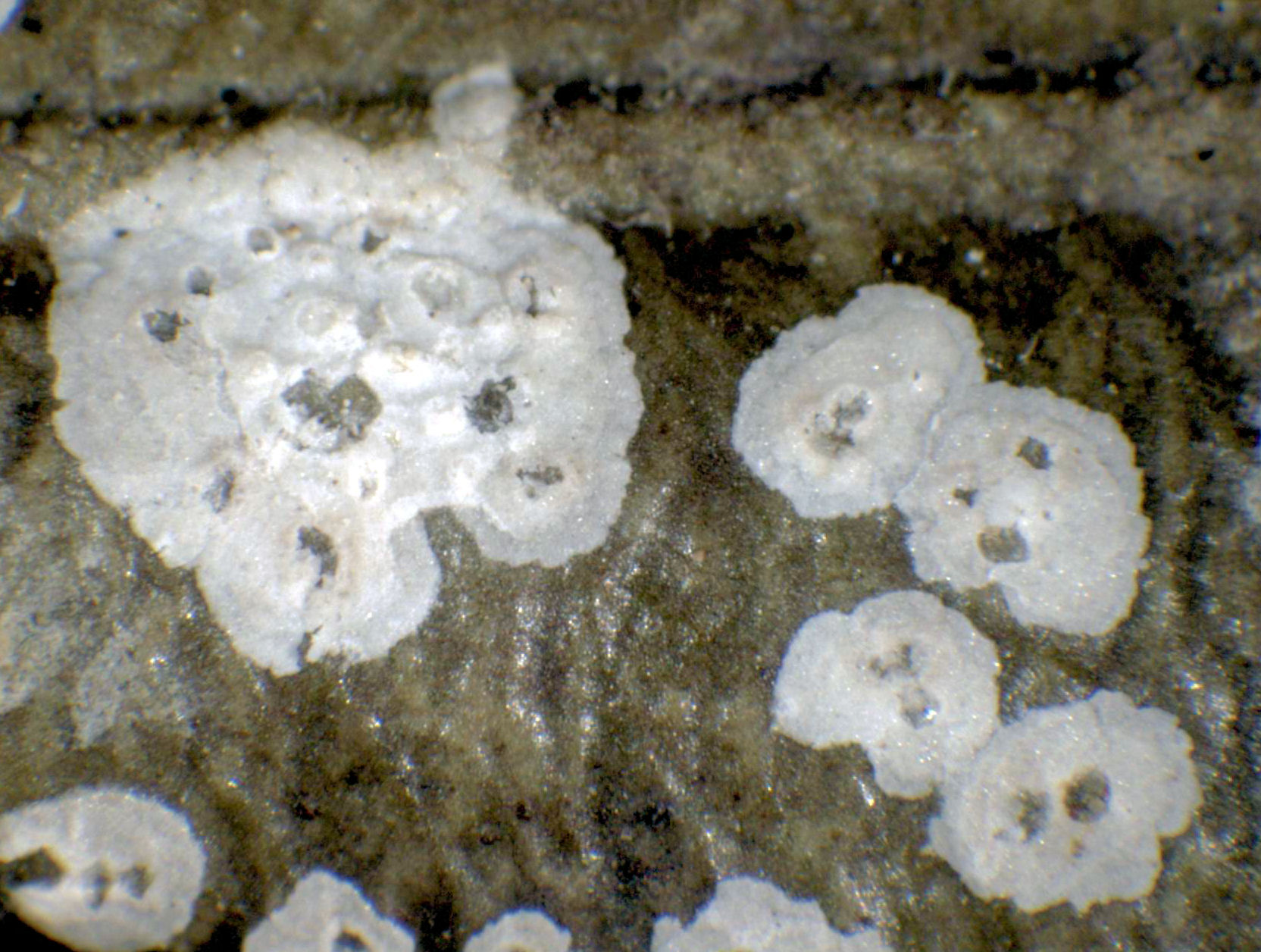

Scientific classification
- Kingdom: Fungi
- Division: Ascomycota
- Class: Lecanoromycetes
- Order: Graphidales
- Family: Gomphillaceae
- Genus: Gyalectidium
- Species: G. minus

Binomial name
- Gyalectidium minus Sérusiaux (2001)

= Gyalectidium minus =

Species of lichen-forming fungus

Gyalectidium minus is a species of lichen-forming fungus in the family Gomphillaceae. It forms tiny silvery to whitish-grey patches on living leaves, with each patch broken into crystal-encrusted blister-like segments, and it reproduces asexually using small marginal structures (hyphophores) that release propagules. Apothecia may also develop and can appear crater-like; each ascus produces a single colourless, multi-chambered ascospore. The species was described from the Canary Islands and is also known from southern Italy and from the humid Atlantic-influenced woodlands of the Sintra Mountains in Portugal.

== Taxonomy ==
Gyalectidium minus was described as a new species in 2001 by Emmanuël Sérusiaux in a world revision of the leaf-dwelling lichen genus Gyalectidium. In the monograph it was discussed as superficially resembling a reduced form of Gyalectidium caucasicum, but treated as distinct based on its tiny, convex thallus patches, the shape and colour of its hyphophore scales, and the colour of its apothecial disc. The authors suggested that its resemblance to G. caucasicum and the absence of that species from western Europe indicate that the two species may have evolved from a common ancestor when their populations became geographically separated (allopatric speciation).

Sanders and Llop reported G. minus from continental Portugal in 2019, extending its known European range to oceanic western Europe. They also noted that earlier Italian material recorded as Gyalectidium caucasicum is now treated as G. minus, and suggested that the scattered records around Macaronesia and the western Mediterranean fit a "tethyan" distribution pattern (centred on Macaronesia and Mediterranean coasts).

== Description ==
The thallus forms very small, angular-rounded to lobe-like patches about 0.3–1.5 mm in diameter. It is made of small, blister-like segments (areolate-bullate) that appear raised and rounded due to heavy crystal coverage, giving it a silvery to whitish-grey appearance, with thin greenish zones sometimes visible at the margins. Hyphophores (structures for asexual reproduction) are produced at or near the thallus edges. The small scales emerge from slightly swollen crystalline bulges and stand at an angle, ranging from triangular to irregularly laciniate (fringed) in shape, about 0.07–0.1 mm long and 0.1–0.2 mm broad. The scales are bluish-grey when young, typically becoming whitish and sometimes translucent with age. Sanders and Llop described the scales in Portuguese material as membranous and narrowing to a point at the tip, and noted that hyphophores can be hard to detect without higher magnification; they bear characteristic diahyphal propagules, bundles of short conidial chains with photobiont cells intermixed.

The photosynthetic partner (photobiont) is a unicellular green alga. In material collected on Tenerife, transmission electron microscopy of algal cells within the thallus showed a pyrenoid structure consistent with the genus Heveochlorella (also treated by some authors as Jaagichlorella). The authors caution that identifying photobionts in minute foliicolous lichens can be complicated by surface-dwelling "epibiontic" algae on leaves, which can contaminate DNA sequences from whole thalli; in G. minus, one clean sequence pointed instead to Chloroidium, conflicting with the pyrenoid evidence.

In the type material, apothecia were scarce and immature, but Sanders and Llop found apothecia to be often abundant in Portuguese collections. They may look like tiny craters, with the surrounding areole swollen and the apothecium appearing as a sunken disc. The exciple commonly forms a pigmented orange-brown ring, and the disc can appear bright green because photobiont cells extend into the tissues above and below the developing hymenium. Each ascus contains a single hyaline, muriform (multichambered) ascospore measuring about 22–45 × 6–19 μm. Pycnidia are scarce and occur near the thin marginal parts of the thallus; they produce rod-shaped (bacilliform) conidia about 2–3 × 0.8–1 μm.

== Habitat and distribution ==
Ferraro and colleagues reported Gyalectidium minus from the Canary Islands (including Tenerife and Gomera) and from southern Italy. On Tenerife it has been recorded from the Anaga laurisilva forest, where it occurs as a predominant element of an extratropical foliicolous lichen community. In the Italian locality (Campania), it was recorded as restricted to leaves of Buxus sempervirens, while Gyalectidium puntilloi in the same site occurred on leaves of Hedera helix and Laurus nobilis. Sanders and Llop reported the species from continental Portugal in 2019 and treated this as the first confirmed foliicolous lichen community from mainland Portugal; in the single known Italian locality, G. minus has been considered a threatened species.

In Portugal, G. minus was found in the Peninha area of the Serra de Sintra, in a fog-prone Atlantic-influenced woodland. It grew abundantly on leaves of the introduced Australian tree Pittosporum undulatum. At this site it often occurred alone on leaves, but common associates included Bacidina apiahica, Fellhanera seroexspectata and Fellhaneropsis myrtillicola; less frequent companions included Byssoloma croceum, Fellhanera bouteillei, Phylloblastia fortuita and Porina hoehneliana. Sanders and Llop suggested that other overlooked foliicolous lichen communities may occur in similarly humid parts of Portugal and north-western Spain.

Gyalectidium minus can be attacked by the lichenicolous hyphomycete (mould-like) Hansfordiellopsis lichenicola, which can affect the vigour of the thallus.
