= Gyalectidium atrosquamulatum =

Scientific classification
- Kingdom: Fungi
- Division: Ascomycota
- Class: Lecanoromycetes
- Order: Graphidales
- Family: Gomphillaceae
- Genus: Gyalectidium
- Species: G. atrosquamulatum

Binomial name
- Gyalectidium atrosquamulatum Lücking & Kalb (2001)
- Type locality: Ol Donyo Sabuk east of Thika, Kenya

Species of lichen-forming fungus

Gyalectidium atrosquamulatum is a species of lichen-forming fungus in the family Gomphillaceae. It is a leaf-dwelling lichen known only from montane rainforest in Kenya, where it was discovered at about 2,100 metres elevation. The species is distinguished by its distinctive dark brownish-black to black reproductive scales, which separate it from similar species in the genus that typically have paler-coloured structures.

== Taxonomy ==
Gyalectidium atrosquamulatum was described as a new species in 2001 by Robert Lücking and Klaus Kalb. In the original description, it was compared with Gyalectidium imperfectum and separated by its dark (brownish-black to black) hyphophore scales.

== Description ==
The thallus forms rounded to irregular patches about 1–3 mm across. Its surface is finely verrucose (minutely warty) and greenish to whitish grey.

Hyphophores (asexual reproductive structures) are produced at the margin of the thallus. The scales begin as a thin brownish layer covering the diahyphal mass (the underlying reproductive tissue), then develop into small, horizontally oriented scales that are narrowly fan-shaped to triangular, with an entire to only slightly irregular edge. They measure about 0.1–0.2 mm in both length and width and are brownish black to black. Apothecia (fruiting bodies) are present; they are rounded, about 0.1–0.2 mm in diameter, with a pale brown disc and a darker brown margin. Ascospores are ellipsoid and measure 30–50 × 12–20 μm. Pycnidia have not been reported.

== Habitat and distribution ==
This species is known only from the type locality in Kenya, where it was collected at about 2,100 m elevation in montane rainforest. It was reported from the same locality as Gyalectidium kenyanum. In a 2002 survey of leaf-dwelling lichens in Kenya, it was one of six Gyalectidium species known to occur in the country.
