= Gyalectidium denticulatum =

Scientific classification
- Kingdom: Fungi
- Division: Ascomycota
- Class: Lecanoromycetes
- Order: Graphidales
- Family: Gomphillaceae
- Genus: Gyalectidium
- Species: G. denticulatum

Binomial name
- Gyalectidium denticulatum Lücking (2001)
- Type locality: Orosi Valley, Costa Rica

Species of lichen-forming fungus

Gyalectidium denticulatum is a species of lichen-forming fungus in the family Gomphillaceae. It is a leaf-dwelling lichen known from Central and South America, including Costa Rica, Brazil, and Argentina. The species is distinguished by its distinctive reproductive structures, which form small crater-like depressions surrounded by a ring of tooth-like segments, a feature that separates it from the similar-looking Gyalectidium caucasicum.

== Taxonomy ==
Gyalectidium denticulatum was described as a new species in 2001 by Robert Lücking. In the original treatment it was emphasized that, without close inspection, the species could easily be mistaken for the widespread Gyalectidium caucasicum because the thallus looks the same. It was separated from that species by its highly derived hyphophores, which are immersed in the thallus and form small crater-like depressions with a ring of tooth-like segments around a green diahyphal mass.

== Description ==
The thallus forms rounded patches about 2–5 mm across. It is areolate-bullate to marginally rugose because it is strongly encrusted with a continuous layer of crystals, giving it a silvery-grey appearance.

Hyphophores are produced on the thallus surface and are immersed into it, appearing as small, rounded depressions about 0.15–0.2 mm in diameter. Around each depression, the hyphophore "scale" is split into narrowly triangular to bristle-like segments that are arranged in a circle and point inward toward the centre; the segments are about 0.05–0.1 mm long and 10–15 μm broad. The segments are whitish, while the exposed diahyphal mass is green. Apothecia and pycnidia have not been reported for this species.

== Habitat and distribution ==
As of its original publication, G. denticulatum known only from the type collection in Costa Rica (Cartago Province, Orosi Valley). It was collected on leaves of trees along a road, so it was found in relatively disturbed vegetation rather than deep forest understory. The authors noted that Gyalectidium laciniatum was collected in the same gathering. As of 2024, G. denticulatum was one of 13 Gyalectidium species that had been documented from Costa Rica. It has also been reported from Argentina and Brazil.
