= Gyalectidium verruculosum =

Scientific classification
- Kingdom: Fungi
- Division: Ascomycota
- Class: Lecanoromycetes
- Order: Graphidales
- Family: Gomphillaceae
- Genus: Gyalectidium
- Species: G. verruculosum

Binomial name
- Gyalectidium verruculosum Sérus. (2001)
- Holotype: Southern side of Ramu River, Brahman Mission, Papua New Guinea

Species of lichen-forming fungus

Gyalectidium verruculosum is a species of lichen-forming fungus in the family Gomphillaceae. It is a leaf-dwelling lichen known from Australasia and the western Pacific, including Papua New Guinea, Australia (Queensland and New South Wales), and Vanuatu. The species is distinguished by its triangular reproductive scales that typically develop from the inner side of a crescent-shaped crystalline bulge on the thallus surface, a feature that separates it from the externally similar Gyalectidium filicinum.

== Taxonomy ==
Gyalectidium verruculosum was described as a new species in 2001 by Emmanuël Sérusiaux. It was separated from the externally similar Gyalectidium filicinum by the form of its hyphophores (asexual reproducive structures), whose triangular scale typically develops from the inner side of a crescent-shaped crystalline bulge on the thallus surface. The author noted that the species had probably been overlooked in Australasia because it could be confused with G. filicinum.

== Description ==
The thallus forms rounded patches about 2–5 mm in diameter. It is finely verrucose and pale greenish to greyish in colour.

Hyphophores are produced on the thallus surface. Their scales are well developed and usually arise from a crescent-shaped, whitish crystalline bulge. The scales are obliquely to almost horizontally oriented and triangular, measuring about 0.15–0.25 mm long and 0.1–0.15 mm broad at the base. They are whitish translucent to pale greyish, only rarely with a bluish tinge. Apothecia (fruiting bodies) are rare overall but can be numerous on some thalli. When present, they are angular to rounded, about 0.15–0.25 mm in diameter, with a pale yellowish-brown to greenish-grey disc that may be slightly pruinose, and a whitish margin. The ascospores are ellipsoid with dimensions of 25–35 × 10–15 μm. Pycnidia were not reported.

== Habitat and distribution ==
Gyalectidium verruculosum was reported from lowland forest along the northern coast of Papua New Guinea, where it occurs together with Gyalectidium caucasicum and G. flabellatum. It was also recorded from Australia (Queensland and New South Wales) and from the Vanuatu archipelago.
