= Gyalectidium australe =

Scientific classification
- Kingdom: Fungi
- Division: Ascomycota
- Class: Lecanoromycetes
- Order: Graphidales
- Family: Gomphillaceae
- Genus: Gyalectidium
- Species: G. australe

Binomial name
- Gyalectidium australe Lücking (2001)
- Type locality: Curtain Fig National Park, Australia

Species of lichen-forming fungus

Gyalectidium australe is a species of lichen-forming fungus in the family Gomphillaceae. It is a leaf-dwelling lichen known from Queensland, Australia, and Yunnan, China, forming tiny silvery-grey patches on living leaves. The species is distinguished by its very small, regularly dispersed thallus patches that produce small, horizontal, tongue-shaped reproductive structures at their margins, and it is one of the few members of its genus that develops disk-shaped fruiting bodies.

== Taxonomy ==
Gyalectidium australe was described as a new species by Robert Lücking in a 2001 revision of Gyalectidium by Ferraro and colleagues. In their treatment, it was placed near Gyalectidium caucasicum and distinguished by its very small, regular thallus patches that produce small, horizontal, liguliform (tongue-shaped) hyphophores at the margins.

== Description ==
The thallus forms minutely dispersed, rounded patches about 0.2–0.3 mm across, which together make well-defined aggregates about 2–5 mm across. The thallus is composed of small, blister-like segments (areolate-bullate) and is heavily covered with a continuous layer of crystals, giving it a silvery to whitish-grey appearance.

Hyphophores (asexual reproductive structures) are produced at the margin. One or several hyphophore scales may develop from each small thallus patch, so they often overlap. The scales are horizontally oriented and liguliform, about 0.1–0.2 mm long and about 0.1 mm broad, and are described as whitish and translucent. Apothecia (fruiting bodies) are present; they are angular-rounded, about 0.2–0.3 mm in diameter, with a pale yellowish-brown to greyish disc that can be thinly pruinose, and a prominent whitish margin. The ascospores are ellipsoid, 30–40 × 12–18 μm. Pycnidia were not reported.

== Habitat and distribution ==
Ferraro and colleagues treated G. australe as a foliicolous member of Gyalectidium (a genus mostly found on living leaves). The species was originally known only from Queensland, Australia, and was regarded as rare in the original account. A second Queensland collection was also cited from Lake Eacham National Park (Wrights Creek). It was later recorded from Yunnan, China.
