= Gyalectidium areolatum =

Scientific classification
- Kingdom: Fungi
- Division: Ascomycota
- Class: Lecanoromycetes
- Order: Graphidales
- Family: Gomphillaceae
- Genus: Gyalectidium
- Species: G. areolatum

Binomial name
- Gyalectidium areolatum Ferraro & Lücking (2001)

Species of lichen-forming fungus

Gyalectidium areolatum is a species of lichen-forming fungus in the family Gomphillaceae. It is a leaf-dwelling lichen found in the Neotropics, particularly common in northern Argentina and Paraguay, with records also from Mexico and Brazil. The species is distinguished by its strongly segmented thallus that breaks into discrete, whitish polygonal patches separated by thin greenish zones, with well-developed scale-like reproductive structures developing at the margins of these segments.

== Taxonomy ==
Gyalectidium areolatum was described as a new species in 2001 by Lidia Ferraro and Robert Lücking. The type material was collected in northern Argentina (Formosa Province), at Estancia Guaycolec, a privately managed nature reserve. The species was separated from similar members of the genus by its strongly areolate thallus (broken into discrete, polygonal patches) combined with well-developed, scale-like hyphophores that develop at the margins of the crystalline areoles.

== Description ==
The thallus (the main body of the lichen) forms rounded patches about 1–3 mm across and is distinctly areolate. It consists of flattened, whitish, polygonal crystalline clusters that are separated (or bordered) by thin, greenish parts of the thallus. The areoles usually develop first near the centre and may become confluent as the thallus matures.

The hyphophores (specialised, scale-like structures that produce dispersal propagules) are submarginal. Their scales are well developed and arise from the outer edge of crescent-shaped areoles. They are obliquely oriented and typically squamiform with two acute lateral projections, measuring about 0.2–0.5 mm wide by 0.15–0.2 mm long. Color ranges from whitish translucent to pale yellowish or orange, sometimes grayish. Apothecia are rare overall but can be abundant on thalli that produce them. They are rounded (sometimes confluent), about 0.1–0.2 mm in diameter, with a grayish-brown disc and margin. The ascospores are ellipsoid, measuring 35–45 × 12–18 μm. Pycnidia have not been reported for this species.

== Habitat and distribution ==
Ferraro and colleagues reported G. areolatum from multiple localities in the Neotropics, with records including Mexico and several parts of South America. Within that range, it appears to be most common in northern Argentina and adjacent Paraguay, and has also been recorded in Brazil.

In ecology it was described as broadly similar to Gyalectidium filicinum, but tending towards slightly more open situations. The authors also noted that the thin greenish thallus zones separating the crystalline areoles may help explain why the hyphophores end up positioned on the thallus surface rather than remaining strictly marginal.
