= Chaetopsis canovae =

Scientific classification
- Domain: Eukaryota
- Kingdom: Fungi
- Division: Ascomycota
- Class: incertae sedis
- Order: incertae sedis
- Family: incertae sedis
- Genus: Chaetopsis
- Species: C. canovae

Binomial name
- Chaetopsis canovae Rambelli

Species of fungus

Chaetopsis canovae is a species of fungus in the genus Chaetopsis.
