= Chaetopsis grisea =

Scientific classification
- Domain: Eukaryota
- Kingdom: Fungi
- Division: Ascomycota
- Class: incertae sedis
- Order: incertae sedis
- Family: incertae sedis
- Genus: Chaetopsis
- Species: C. grisea

Binomial name
- Chaetopsis grisea (Ehrenb.) Sacc.

Species of fungus

Chaetopsis grisea is a species of fungus in the genus Chaetopsis.
