= Chaetopsis (fungus) =

Scientific classification
- Domain: Eukaryota
- Kingdom: Fungi
- Division: Ascomycota
- Class: incertae sedis
- Order: incertae sedis
- Family: incertae sedis
- Genus: Chaetopsis; Grev., Edinburgh Philos. J

Genus of fungus

Chaetopsis is a genus of fungus in the Ascomycota. It is considered incertae sedis within the division. It contains the following species:

- Chaetopsis canovae
- Chaetopsis cubensis
- Chaetopsis cylindrospora
- Chaetopsis fusca
- Chaetopsis graminicola
- Chaetopsis grisea
- Chaetopsis hennebertii
- Chaetopsis intermedia
- Chaetopsis macroclada
- Chaetopsis oligosperma
- Chaetopsis probosciophora
- Chaetopsis romantica
- Chaetopsis roseola
- Chaetopsis stachyoloba
- Chaetopsis ulicis
- Chaetopsis wauchii

== See also ==
- List of Ascomycota genera incertae sedis
