= Chaetopsis oligosperma =

Scientific classification
- Domain: Eukaryota
- Kingdom: Fungi
- Division: Ascomycota
- Class: incertae sedis
- Order: incertae sedis
- Family: incertae sedis
- Genus: Chaetopsis
- Species: C. oligosperma

Binomial name
- Chaetopsis oligosperma (Bonord.) DiCosmo, S.M. Berch & W.B. Kendr.

Species of fungus

Chaetopsis oligosperma is a species of fungus in the genus Chaetopsis.
