= Chaetopsis hennebertii =

Scientific classification
- Domain: Eukaryota
- Kingdom: Fungi
- Division: Ascomycota
- Class: incertae sedis
- Order: incertae sedis
- Family: incertae sedis
- Genus: Chaetopsis
- Species: C. hennebertii

Binomial name
- Chaetopsis hennebertii (W. Gams & Hol.-Jech.) DiCosmo, S.M. Berch & W.B. Kendr.

Species of fungus

Chaetopsis hennebertii is a species of fungus in the genus Chaetopsis.
