= Briosia =

Scientific classification
- Kingdom: Fungi
- Division: Ascomycota
- Class: incertae sedis
- Order: incertae sedis
- Family: incertae sedis
- Genus: Briosia; Cavara, 1888

Species
- Briosia ampelophaga; Briosia microspore; Briosia platoniae

Genus of fungi

Briosia is a genus of ascomycete fungi. The known members of the genus are plant pathogens.

The genus name of Briosia is in honour of Giovanni Briosi (1846-1919), an Italian engineer and botanist from the University of Pavia.

The genus was circumscribed by Fridiano Cavara in Atti Ist. Bot. Univ. Pavia ser.2, Vol.1 on page 321 in 1888.

== See also ==
- List of Ascomycota genera incertae sedis
