= Briosia ampelophaga =

Scientific classification
- Kingdom: Fungi
- Division: Ascomycota
- Class: incertae sedis
- Order: incertae sedis
- Family: incertae sedis
- Genus: Briosia
- Species: B. ampelophaga

Binomial name
- Briosia ampelophaga Cavara (1888)

Species of fungus

Briosia ampelophaga is an ascomycete fungus that is a plant pathogen.
