= List of mitosporic Ascomycota =

The mitosporic Ascomycota are a heterogeneous group of ascomycotic fungi whose common characteristic is the absence of a sexual state (anamorph); many of the pathogenic fungi in humans belong to this group.

- Acremonium
- Acrodontium
- Alatospora
- Anguillospora
- Antennariella
- Anungitopsis
- Aphanocladium
- Bispora
- Brachyconidiella
- Calcarisporium
- Capnobotryella
- Cephaliophora
- Ceratocladium
- Chaetasbolisia
- Chaetomella
- Clathrosporium
- Colispora
- Coniosporium
- Corynespora
- Curvicladium
- Cytoplea
- Dactylaria
- Duddingtonia
- Eladia
- Endoconidioma
- Engyodontium
- Flagellospora
- Fonsecaea
- Geniculifera
- Glarea
- Gliocephalis
- Goniopila
- Gonytrichum
- Gyoerffyella
- Helminthosporium
- Hormococcus
- Humicola
- Hyphozyma
- Kabatina
- Kendrickiella
- Kloeckera
- Kumanasamuha
- Lecophagus
- Lemonniera
- Leptodontidium
- Limaciniaseta
- Lunulospora
- Macrophoma
- Macrophomina
- Madurella
- Microsphaeropsis
- Moniliella
- Myxocephala
- Nakataea
- Neoplaconema
- Noosia
- Ochroconis
- Oosporidium
- Phaeoisariopsis
- Phaeomoniella
- Phaeoramularia
- Phaeosclera
- Phaeoseptoria
- Phaeotheca
- Phaeotrichoconis
- Phialemonium
- Phoma
- Polycytella
- Pseudofusarium
- Pseudotaeniolina
- Raffaelea
- Readeriella
- Rhizopycnis
- Rhizosphaera
- Rhynchosporium
- Robillarda
- Saitoella
- Sarcopodium
- Sarocladium
- Scleroconidioma
- Sclerotium
- Scolecobasidium
- Scytalidium
- Sirococcus
- Spegazzinia
- Sphaerographium
- Spicellum
- Spirosphaera
- Stachybotrys
- Stanjemonium
- Symbiotaphrina
- Synchaetomella
- Termitaria
- Tetrachaetum
- Tetracladium
- Thermomyces
- Tilachlidium
- Tricellulortus
- Trichosporonoides
- Trichothecium
- Tricladium
- Tritirachium
- Tumularia
- Verticimonosporium
- Xenochalara
- Zalerion
