= Notiosciadium =

Scientific classification
- Kingdom: Plantae
- Clade: Tracheophytes
- Clade: Angiosperms
- Clade: Eudicots
- Clade: Asterids
- Order: Apiales
- Family: Apiaceae
- Subfamily: Apioideae
- Tribe: Pyramidoptereae
- Genus: Notiosciadium; Speg.
- Species: N. pampicola

Binomial name
- Notiosciadium pampicola Speg.

Genus of plants

Notiosciadium is a genus of flowering plants belonging to the family Apiaceae. Its only species is Notiosciadium pampicola. Its native range is Northeastern Argentina to Uruguay.
