= Cucujomyces elegans =

Scientific classification
- Kingdom: Fungi
- Division: Ascomycota
- Class: Laboulbeniomycetes
- Order: Laboulbeniales
- Family: Laboulbeniaceae
- Genus: Cucujomyces
- Species: C. elegans

Binomial name
- Cucujomyces elegans Speg. (1917)

Species of fungus

Cucujomyces elegans is a species of fungus in the family Laboulbeniaceae. It is found in Argentina.
