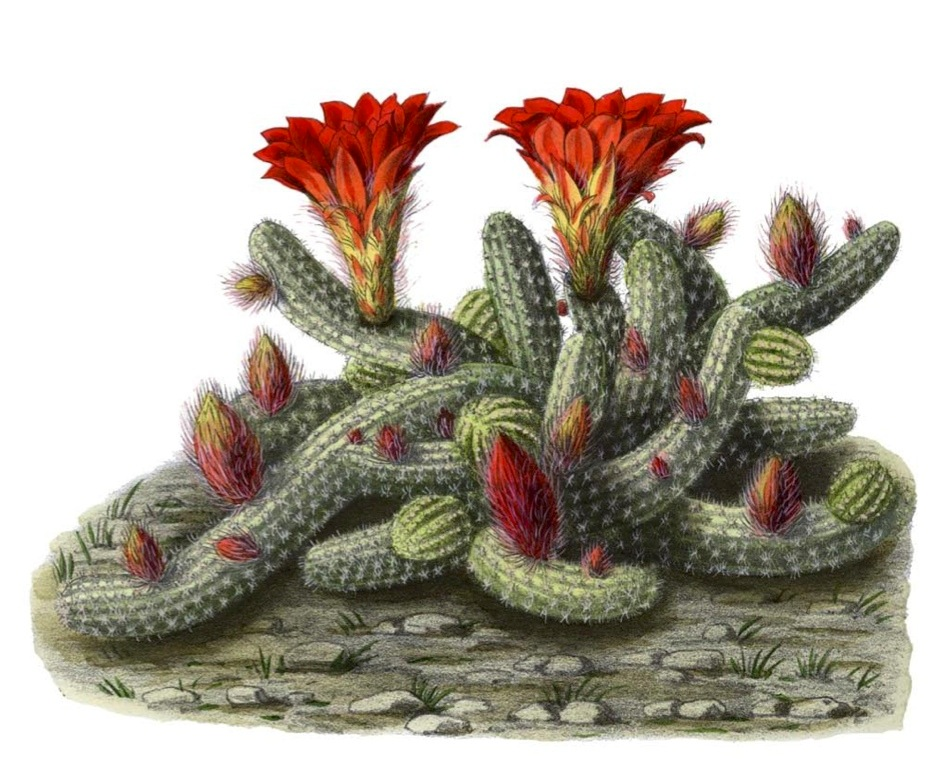

Scientific classification
- Kingdom: Plantae
- Clade: Tracheophytes
- Clade: Angiosperms
- Clade: Eudicots
- Order: Caryophyllales
- Family: Cactaceae
- Subfamily: Cactoideae
- Genus: Echinopsis
- Species: E. chamaecereus

Binomial name
- Echinopsis chamaecereus H.Friedrich & Glaetzle

Synonyms
- Cereus silvestrii Speg.; Cereus silvestrii var. crassicaulis Backeb.; Chamaecereus silvestrii (Speg.) Britton & Rose; Lobivia silvestrii (Speg.) G.D.Rowley

= Echinopsis chamaecereus =

Species of cactus

Echinopsis chamaecereus is a species of cactus from northwestern Argentina and Bolivia. Synonyms include Chamaecereus silvestrii. It has been called the peanut cactus. This plant should not be confused with Echinopsis silvestrii, a synonym of Echinopsis albispinosa, a species with a very different appearance.

== Description ==
Echinopsis chamaecereus has long stems about 1 cm (0.4 in) across. Orange flowers up to 4 cm (1.6 in) wide appear in late spring. In cultivation, E. chamaecereus is hardy to temperatures as low as −7 °C (19 °F) if kept dry.

== Taxonomy ==
Echinopsis chamaecereus was first collected and described in 1896 as Cereus silvestrii by Italian-Argentinian botanist Carlo Luigi Spegazzini in the mountains between the provinces of Tucuman and Salta, Argentina. However, subsequent expeditions to the area failed to find the species Spegazzini had collected and it is unknown whether the species has gone extinct since the initial collection. It was transferred to the genus Chamaecereus as Ch. silvestrii by Britton and Rose in 1922. When Chamaecereus was synonymized with Echinopsis, the combination Echinopsis silvestrii had already been used, so the replacement name Echinopsis chamaecereus was published in 1983.

== Cultivation ==
This plant is a recipient of the Royal Horticultural Society's Award of Garden Merit.

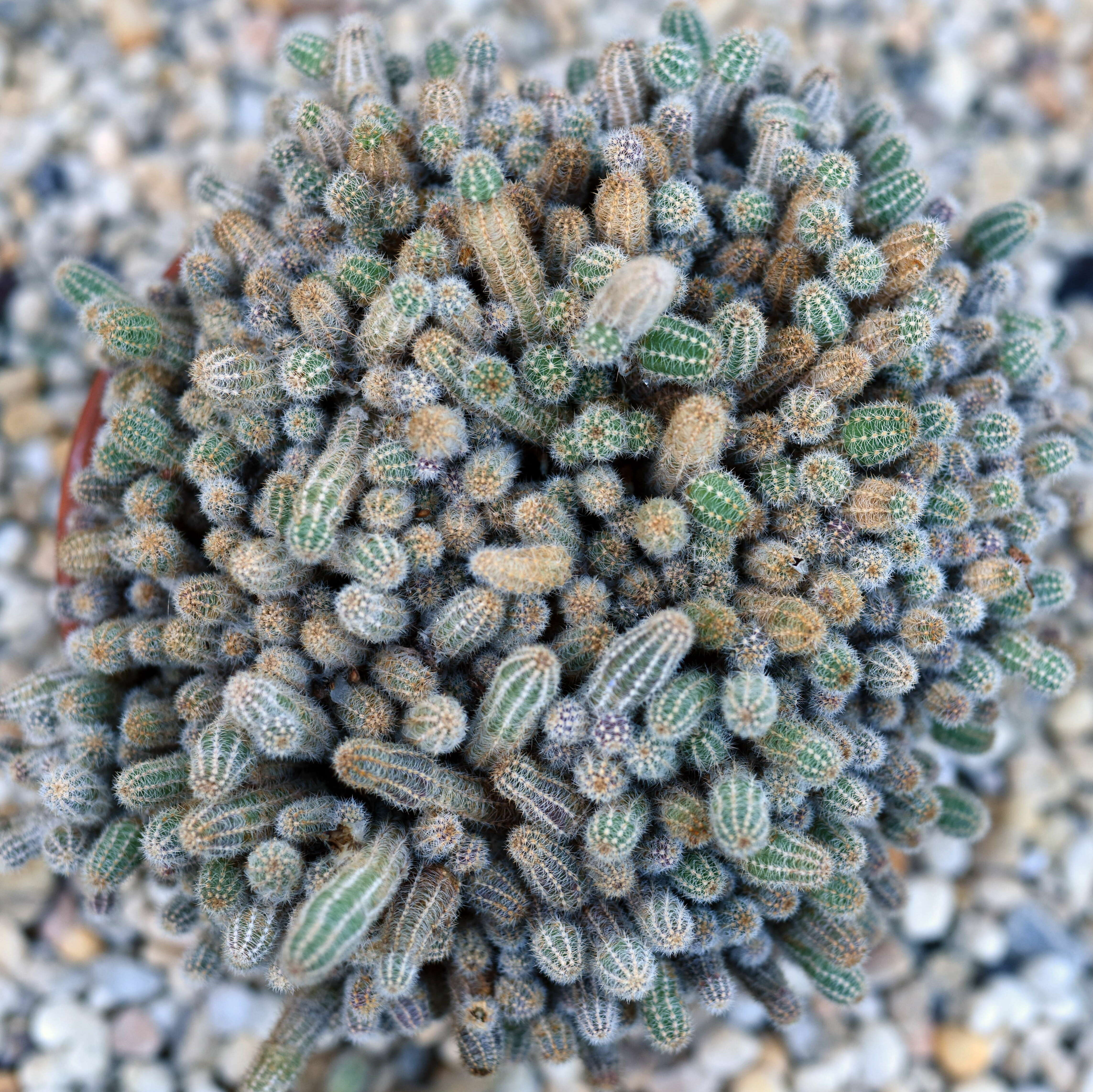
Talcott Greenhouse

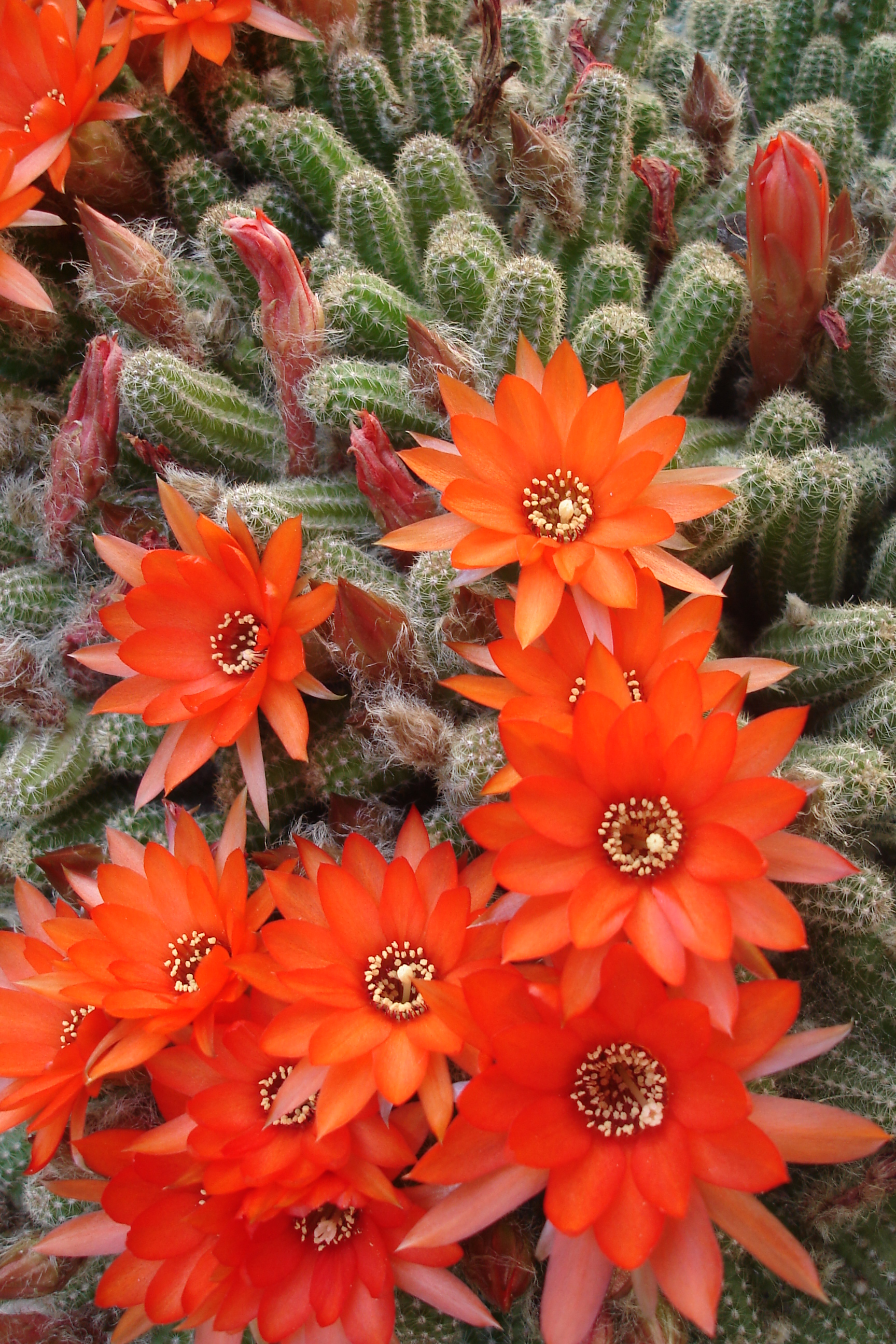
Flowers
