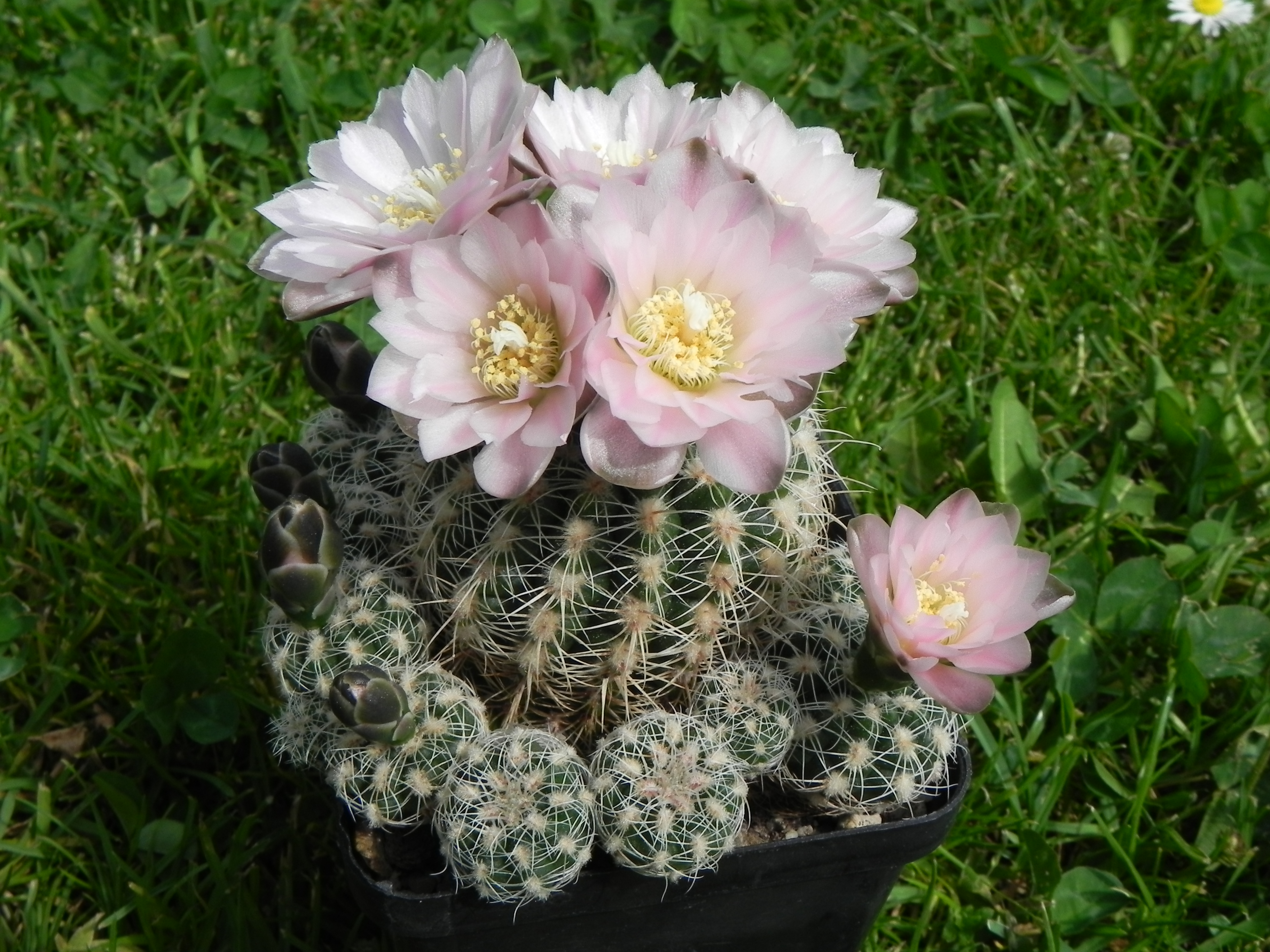

Conservation status
- Least Concern (IUCN 3.1)

Scientific classification
- Kingdom: Plantae
- Clade: Tracheophytes
- Clade: Angiosperms
- Clade: Eudicots
- Order: Caryophyllales
- Family: Cactaceae
- Subfamily: Cactoideae
- Genus: Gymnocalycium
- Species: G. bruchii

Binomial name
- Gymnocalycium bruchii (Speg.) Hosseus 1926

= Gymnocalycium bruchii =

Species of cactus

Gymnocalycium bruchii is a species of Gymnocalycium from Argentina.

== Description ==
Gymnocalycium bruchii grows abundantly and forms multi-headed mats of dark green shoots that reach heights of up to 3.5 centimeters with diameters of 6 centimeters. The approximately eight to 12 (up to 17) low, straight ribs are rounded and the roots are tuberous. The one to three white or brownish central spines, which can occasionally be missing, are protruding. The twelve to 14 (up to 26, rarely from seven) thin, bristle-like, glassy white marginal spines are bent back and are 2 to 6 millimeters long.

The delicate violet-pink to white flowers, which are often unisexual, are usually 3.5 to 5 centimeters long and have the same diameter. The pericarpel is short, dark brown-green and shows some light-edged scales. Stamens, styles and stigma branches are white and the pollen is yellowish. The blue-green to whitish-green fruits are spherical, pear-shaped or spindle-shaped. They are up to 1.5 centimeters long and reach 1.2 centimeters in diameter. The seeds are 1.2 to 1.4 mm long and more or less spherical.

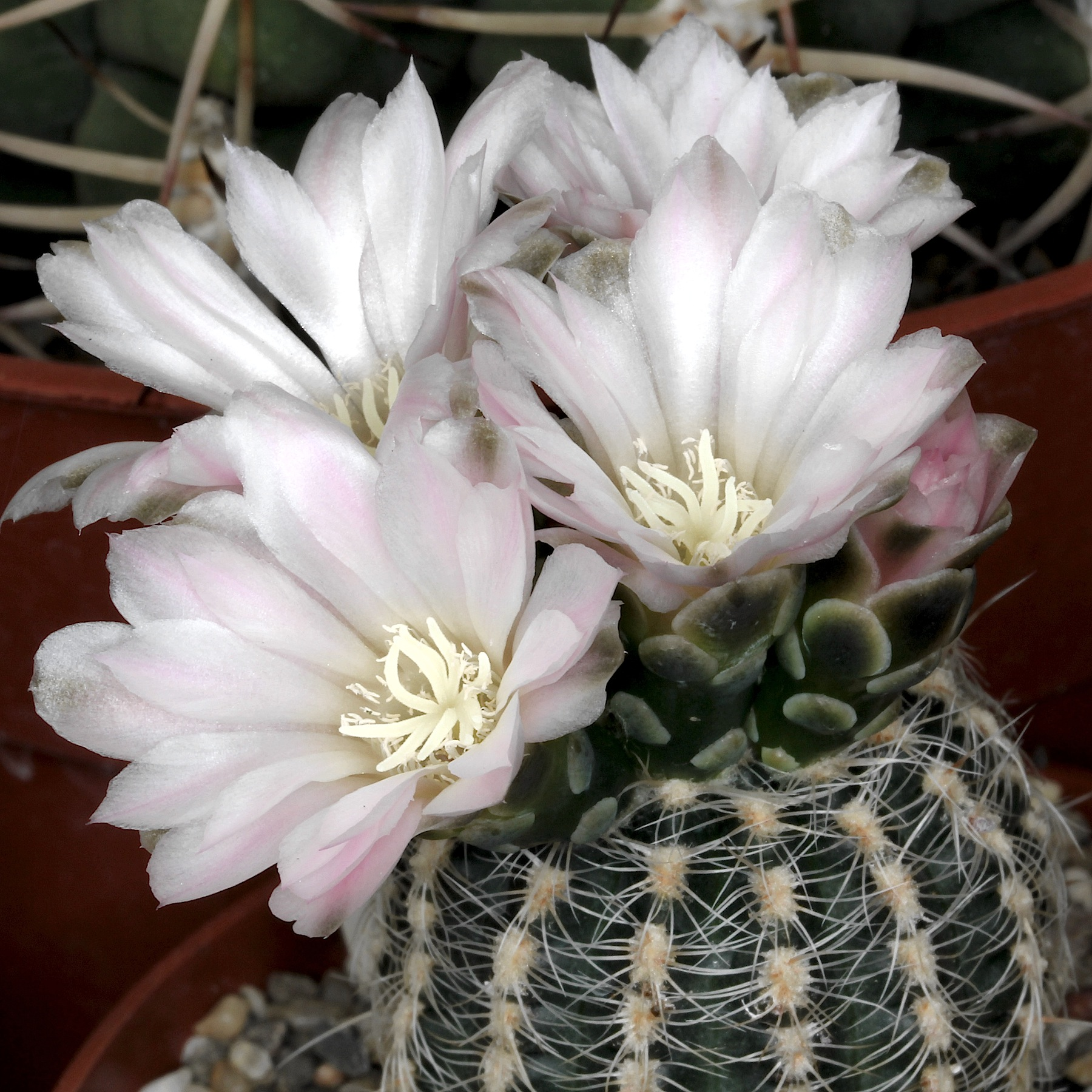
White Flowers

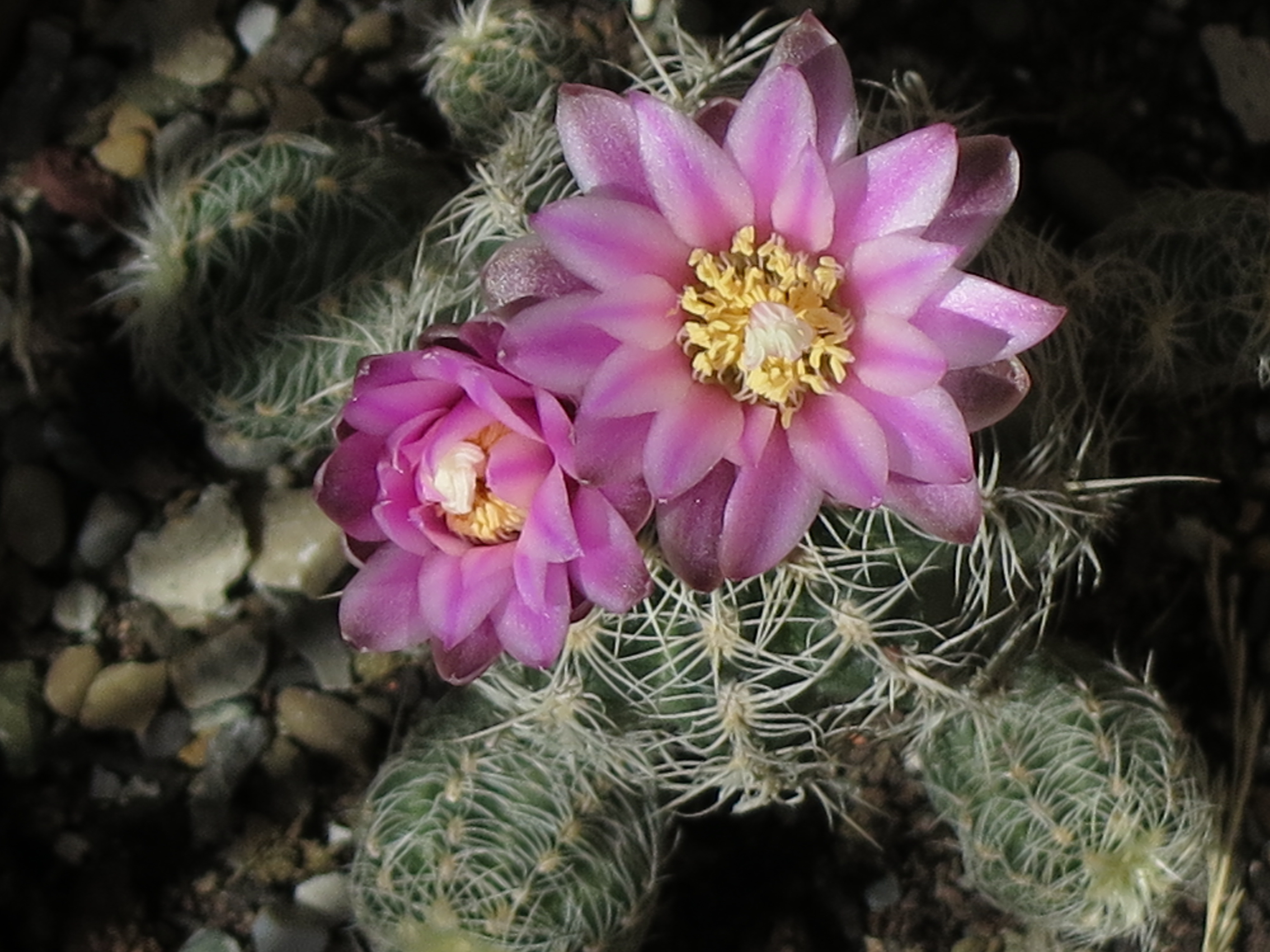
Flowers

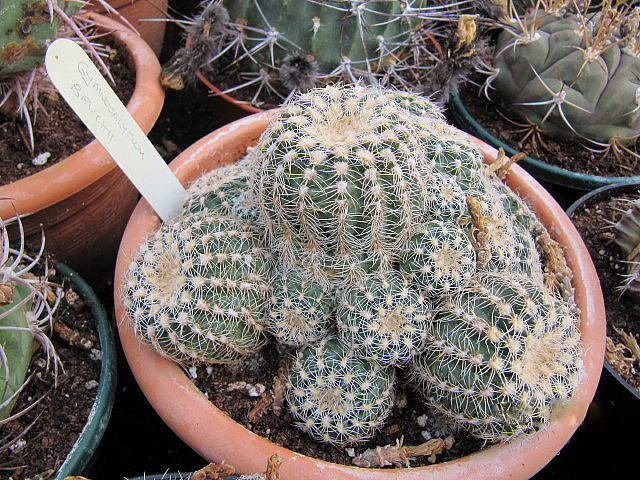
Plant

== Distribution ==
Gymnocalycium bruchii is widespread in the Argentine province of Córdoba and San Luis at altitudes of 500 to 2000 meters.

== Taxonomy ==
The first description as Frailea bruchii was made in 1923 by Carlos Luis Spegazzini. The specific epithet bruchii honors the Argentine photographer and entomologist Carlos Bruch (1869–1943). Carl Curt Hosseus placed the species in the genus Gymnocalycium in 1926. A nomenclature synonym is Astrophytum bruchii (Speg.) Halda & Malina (2005).
