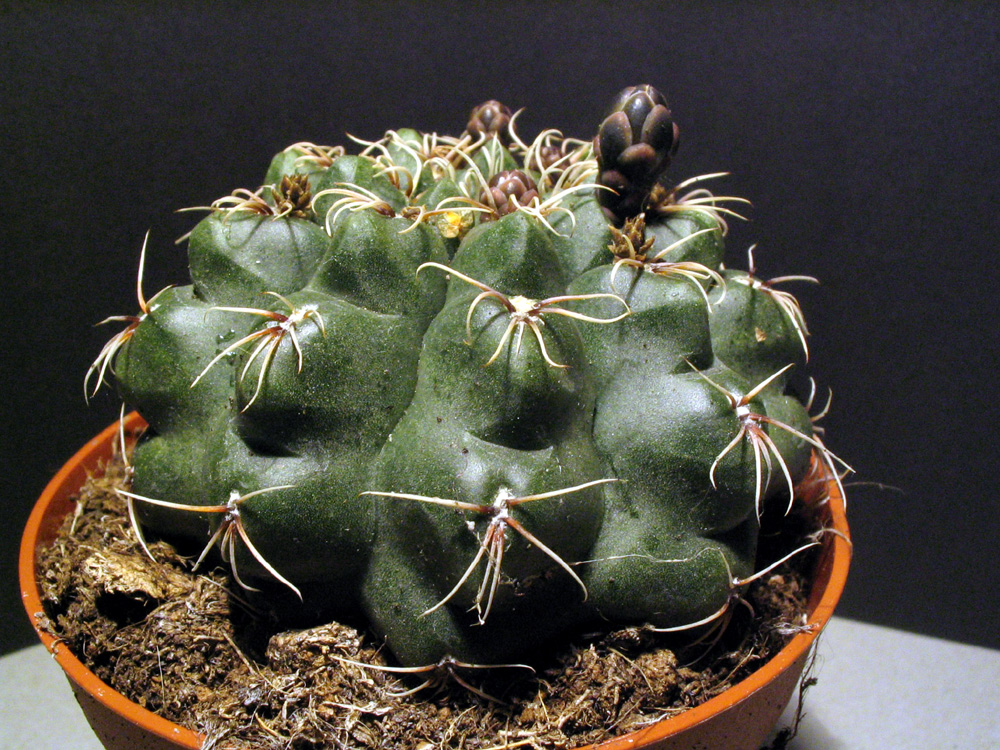

Conservation status
- Least Concern (IUCN 3.1)

Scientific classification
- Kingdom: Plantae
- Clade: Tracheophytes
- Clade: Angiosperms
- Clade: Eudicots
- Order: Caryophyllales
- Family: Cactaceae
- Subfamily: Cactoideae
- Genus: Gymnocalycium
- Species: G. baldianum

Binomial name
- Gymnocalycium baldianum Speg., 1905

Synonyms
- Echinocactus baldianus Speg., 1905; Echinocactus venturianum

= Gymnocalycium baldianum =

Species of cactus

Gymnocalycium baldianum, the spider-cactus or dwarf chin cactus, is a species of flowering plant in the cactus family Cactaceae, native to the Catamarca Province in Argentina.

== Description ==
It is a globose cactus, spherical or a little flat, with a diameter up to 8 cm, dark gray-green to blue-green in color, or sometimes brown, depressed, spherical shoots and reaches heights of 4 to 10 centimeters with diameters of 6 to 7 centimeters. It has 8 to 10 ribs with tubercle-shaped areoles, covered in groups of 6 to 8 pale grey, curved spines, giving to the species its common name of spider-cactus. Like many cacti, it does not divide but may form offsets after some years. There are no central spines. The five to seven gray or brown marginal thorns are thin, lie on the surface of the shoot and are up to 1.5 centimeters long.

The funnel-shaped flowers reach a diameter of 6 cm, growing near the apex of the plant and are red, pink or orange. Flowers are 3 to 5 centimeters long and reach the same diameter. The dark gray-green fruits are spindle-shaped.

== Distribution ==
Gymnocalycium baldianum is widespread in the Argentine province of Catamarca at altitudes of 1000 to 2000 meters.

== Taxonomy ==
The first description as Echinocactus baldianus was made in 1905 by Carlos Luis Spegazzini. The specific epithet baldianum honors J. Baldi, an acquaintance and supporter of Carlos Luis Spegazzini. In 1925 he placed the species in the genus Gymnocalycium.

== Cultivation ==
Gymnocalycium baldianum is easy to grow. It needs a well-drained soil. In summer, water the plants well, but let them to dry before watering again. Use monthly a fertilizer for cacti. In winter, keep it dry, and the temperature may be as low as −10 °C (14 °F), but it is better to keep it without frost. The exposure must be sunny in summer and at least brightly lit in winter.

This species has gained the Royal Horticultural Society's Award of Garden Merit.

== Gallery ==
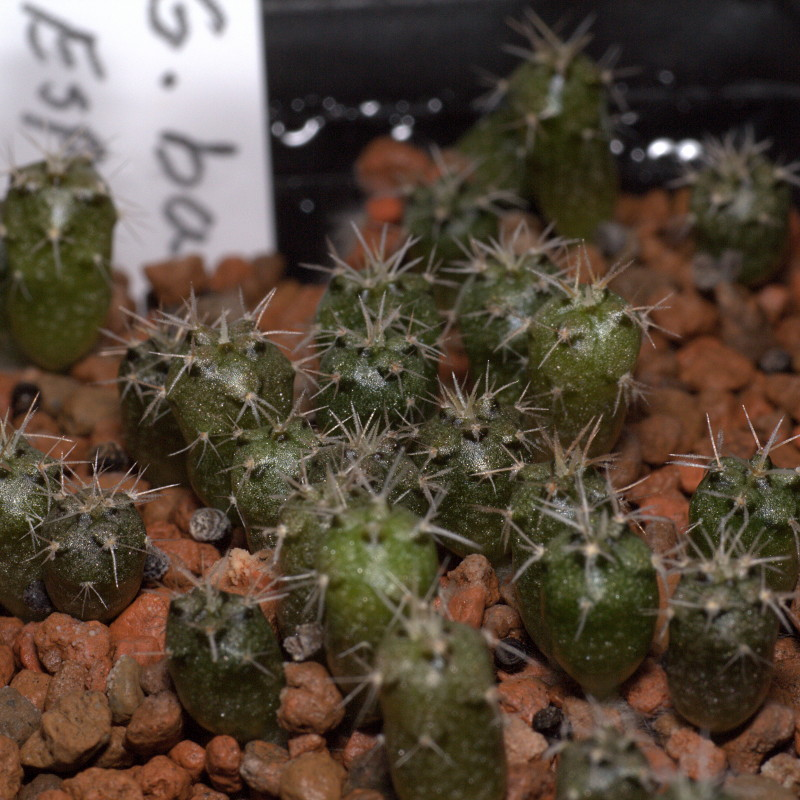
Seedlings

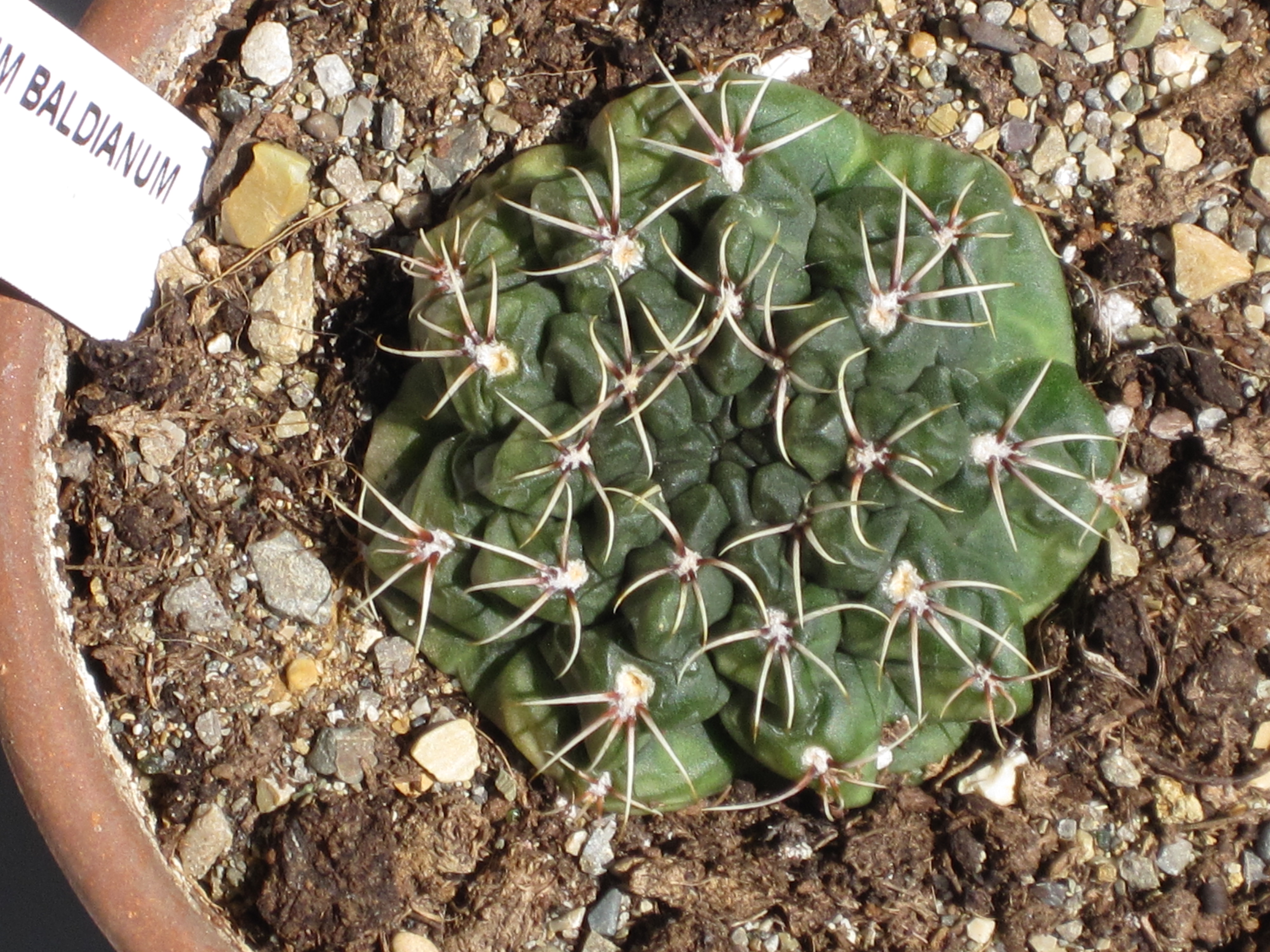
View from above

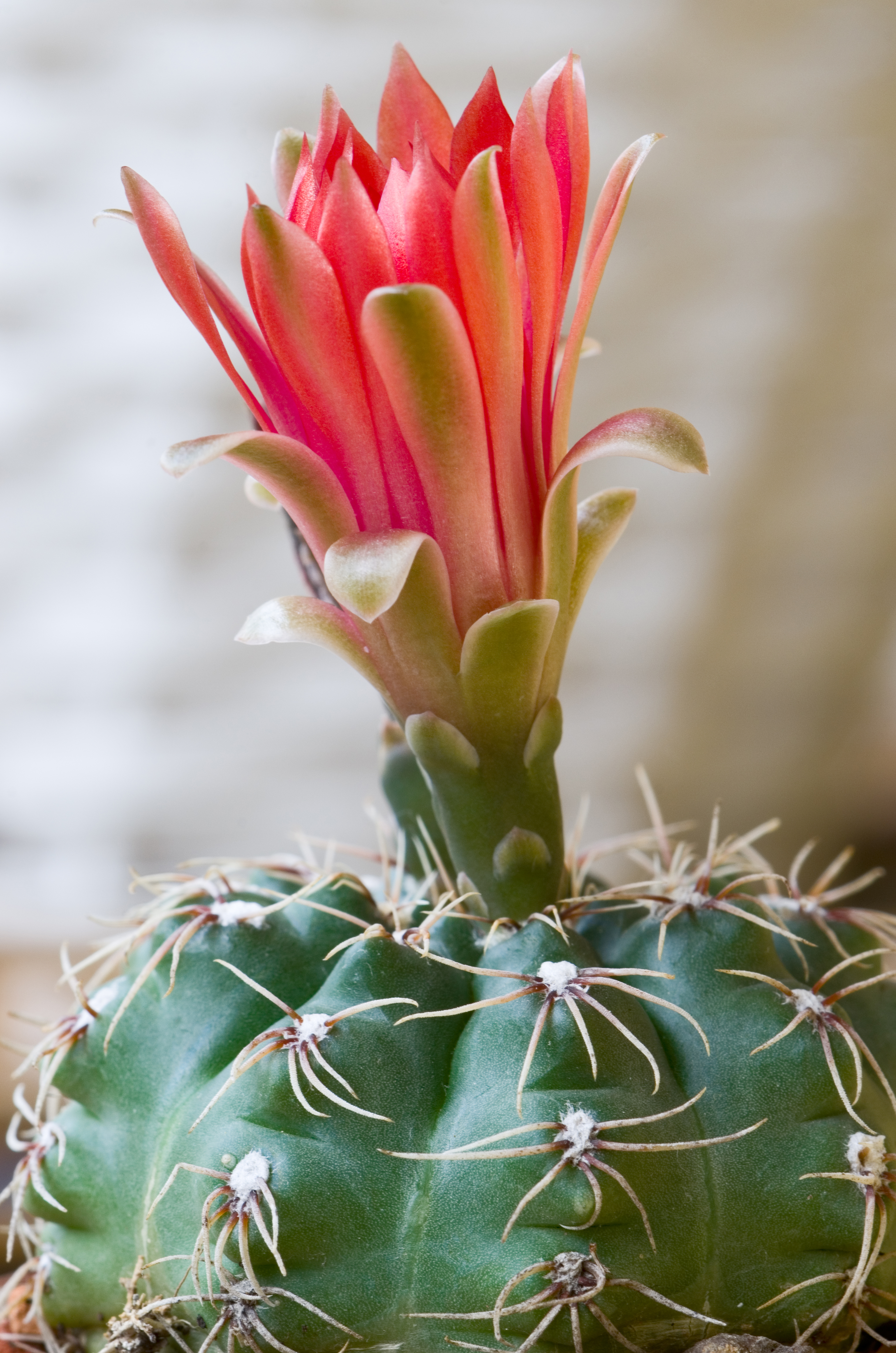
Flower from the side

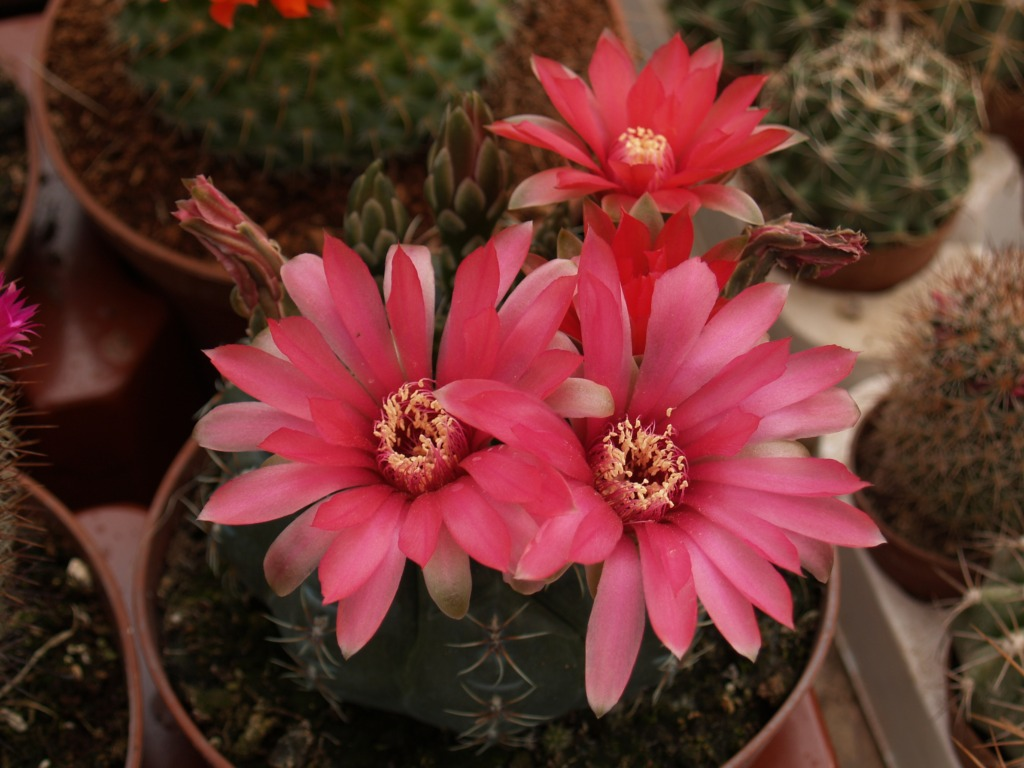
Flowers from above view
