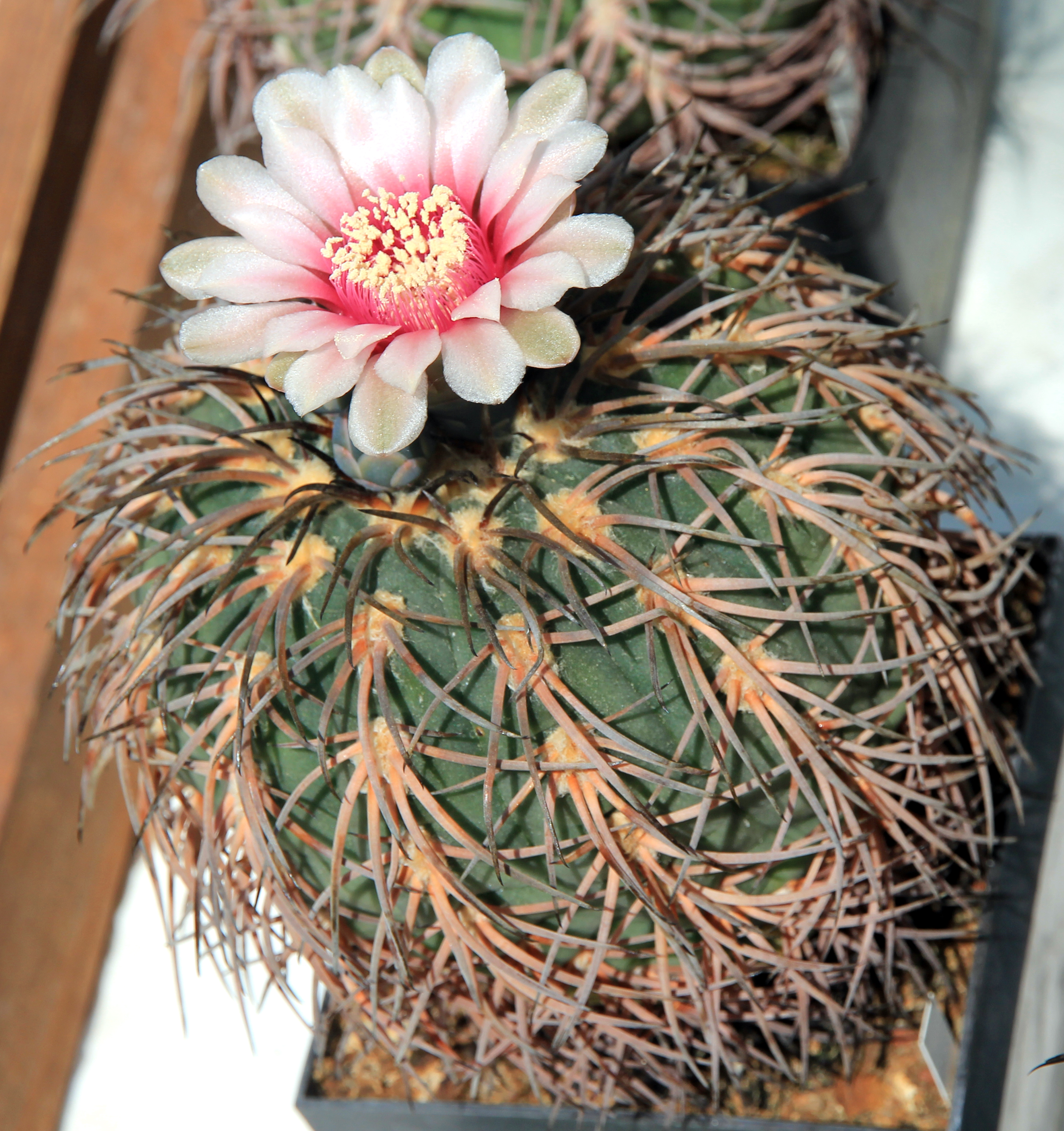

Conservation status
- Least Concern (IUCN 3.1)

Scientific classification
- Kingdom: Plantae
- Clade: Tracheophytes
- Clade: Angiosperms
- Clade: Eudicots
- Order: Caryophyllales
- Family: Cactaceae
- Subfamily: Cactoideae
- Genus: Gymnocalycium
- Species: G. spegazzinii

Binomial name
- Gymnocalycium spegazzinii Britton & Rose 1922

Synonyms
- Echinocactus loricatus Speg. 1905; Gymnocalycium loricatum Speg. 1925

= Gymnocalycium spegazzinii =

Species of cactus

Gymnocalycium spegazzinii is a species of Gymnocalycium from Argentina and Bolivia named after the botanist C. L. Spegazzini.

== Description ==
Gymnocalycium spegazzinii grows individually with gray-green to brown, flattened, spherical shoots and reaches heights of 6 to 12 centimeters with diameters of 10 to 14 centimeters. The 10 to 15 (rarely up to 30) low, broad ribs are slightly notched between the areoles. There are up to 2 central spines, which may also be missing. The 3 to 7 stiff marginal thorns, first bent outwards and then inwards towards the shoot surface, are brown or light ocher and 2 to 5.5 centimeters long.

The funnel-shaped, white or light pink flowers have a slightly purple-pink throat. They reach a length of up to 7 centimeters and a diameter of 5 centimeters. The fruits are club-shaped to elongated.

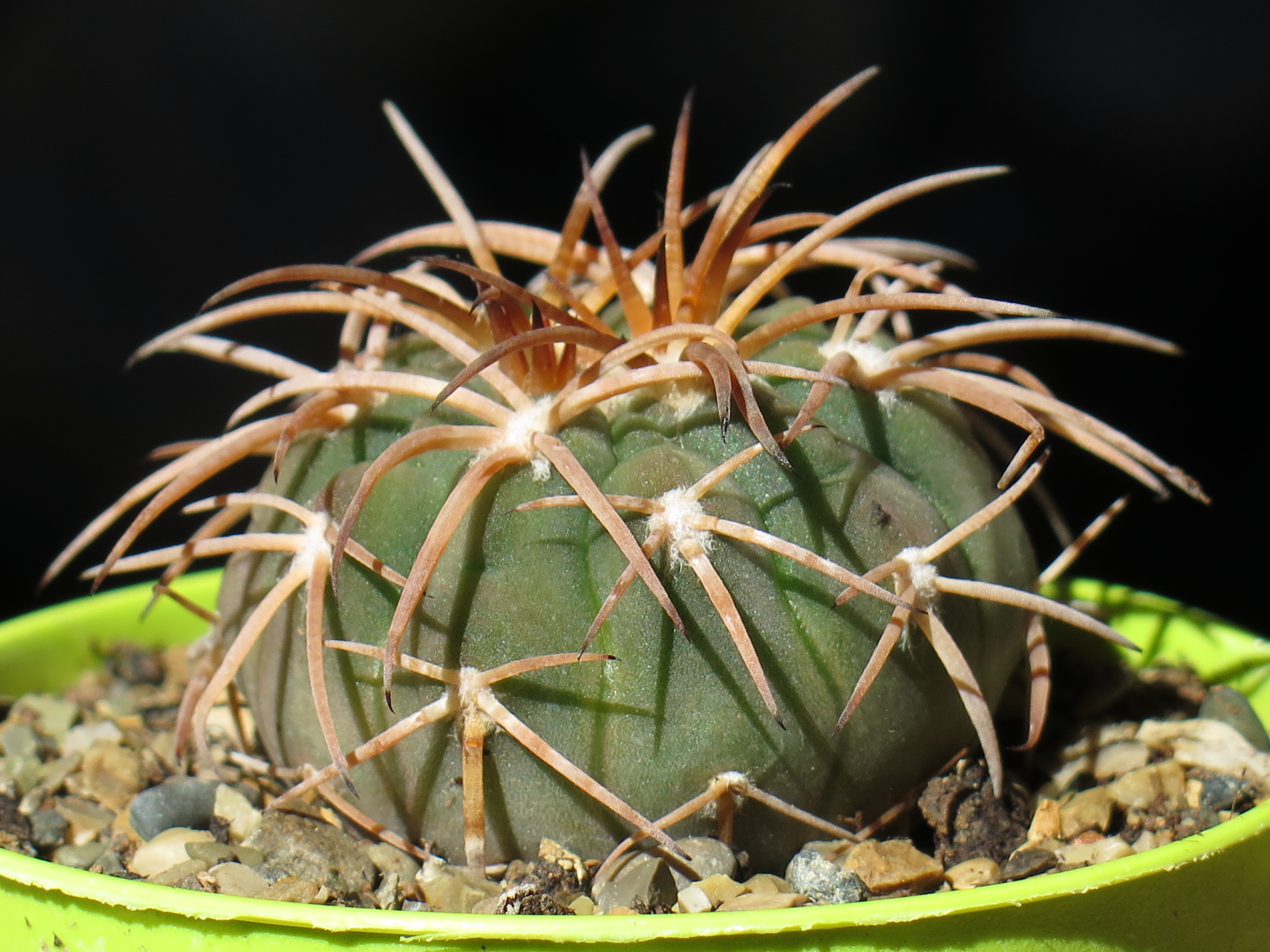
Plant

=== Subspecies ===
Accepted subspecies:

Image	Scientific name	Distribution
	Gymnocalycium spegazzinii subsp. cardenasianum (F.Ritter) R.Kiesling & Metzing	Bolivia
	Gymnocalycium spegazzinii subsp. spegazzinii	Argentina

== Distribution ==
Gymnocalycium spegazzinii is widespread in northern Argentina and Bolivia at altitudes of 1500 to 3000 meters.

== Taxonomy ==
The first description was made in 1922 by Nathaniel Lord Britton and Joseph Nelson Rose.
