= Sarcopodium =

Scientific classification
- Kingdom: Fungi
- Division: Ascomycota
- Class: incertae sedis
- Order: incertae sedis
- Family: incertae sedis
- Genus: Sarcopodium; Ehrenb. (1818)

Type species
- Sarcopodium circinatum Ehrenb. (1818)

Genus of fungi

Sarcopodium is a genus of anamorphic fungi in the division Ascomycota. It was described by German naturalist Christian Gottfried Ehrenberg in 1818.

Species in the genus include:

- Sarcopodium ammonis
- Sarcopodium araliae
- Sarcopodium atrum
- Sarcopodium avenaceum
- Sarcopodium circinatum
- Sarcopodium circinosetiferum
- Sarcopodium coffeanum
- Sarcopodium flavum
- Sarcopodium foliicola
- Sarcopodium fulvescens
- Sarcopodium fuscum
- Sarcopodium macalpinei
- Sarcopodium nigrum
- Sarcopodium oculorum
- Sarcopodium pironii
- Sarcopodium rosellum
- Sarcopodium roseum
- Sarcopodium saccardianum
- Sarcopodium saccardoanum
- Sarcopodium salicellum
- Sarcopodium synnemaferum
- Sarcopodium synnematoferum
- Sarcopodium tortuosum
- Sarcopodium vanillae
- Sarcopodium variegatum

== See also ==
- List of mitosporic Ascomycota
