= Cucujomyces =

Scientific classification
- Kingdom: Fungi
- Division: Ascomycota
- Class: Laboulbeniomycetes
- Order: Laboulbeniales
- Family: Laboulbeniaceae
- Genus: Cucujomyces; Speg. 1917

Type species
- Cucujomyces cylindrocarpus Speg. 1917

Species
- See text

Synonyms
- Stephanomyces Speg. 1917

Genus of fungi

Cucujomyces is a genus of fungi in the family Laboulbeniaceae. The genus contains 14 species.

== Species ==
- Cucujomyces bilobatus Thaxt. 1918
- Cucujomyces celebensis W. Rossi & A. Weir 1996
- Cucujomyces curtipes Thaxt. 1917
- Cucujomyces cylindrocarpus Speg. 1917 (type)
- Cucujomyces diplocoeli Thaxt. 1917
- Cucujomyces elegans Speg. 1917
- Cucujomyces elegantissimus (Speg.) Thaxt. 1931
- Cucujomyces gonicoeli Thaxt. 1931
- Cucujomyces intermedius Thaxt. 1917
- Cucujomyces melanopus Speg. 1917
- Cucujomyces phycophilus A. Weir & W. Rossi 1997
- Cucujomyces reynoldsii Thaxt. 1931
- Cucujomyces rotundatus T. Majewski 1974
- Cucujomyces stipatus Thaxt. 1917
