= Corynespora cassiicola =

Scientific classification
- Kingdom: Fungi
- Division: Ascomycota
- Class: Dothideomycetes
- Order: Pleosporales
- Family: Corynesporascaceae
- Genus: Corynespora
- Species: C. cassiicola

Binomial name
- Corynespora cassiicola (Berk. & M.A. Curtis) C.T. Wei, (1950)

Synonyms
- Cercospora melonis Cooke, Gard. Chron., (1896); Cercospora vignicola E. Kawam., (1931); Corynespora melonis (Cooke) Sacc., (1913); Corynespora vignicola (E. Kawam.) Goto, (1950); Helminthosporium cassiicola Berk. & M.A. Curtis [as 'cassiaecola'], (1868); Helminthosporium papayae Syd., (1923); Helminthosporium vignae Olive{?}, in Olive, Bain & Lefebvre, (1945); Helminthosporium vignicola (E. Kawam.) Olive, Mycologia 41: 355 (1949)

Species of fungus

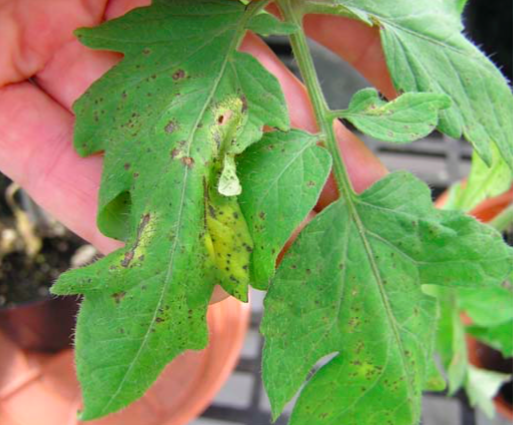
Corynespora cassiicola ring-spots symptoms on the leaves of tomato plants. Photograph by Dr. Ken Pernezny from University of Florida.

Corynespora cassiicola is a species of fungus well known as a plant pathogen. It is a sac fungus in the family Corynesporascaceae. It is the type species of the genus Corynespora.

== Hosts ==
This fungus infects over 530 species of plants in 53 families. In the tropics and subtropics, it is most common. It has also been isolated from nematodes and from human skin.

The fungus is known as a pathogen of many agricultural crop plants, especially cowpea, cucumber, papaya, rubber, soybean, and tomato. It has caused crop failures resulting in high economic losses in over 70 countries, including losses of over US$3000 per acre in tomato crops in Florida in the United States. On several plants, such as tomatoes, the fungus causes a disease called target spot or target leaf spot. The disease is identified by leaf damage taking the form of target-shaped spots with light centres and dark margins, as well as pits on the fruit. The fungus also causes a disease on the cultivated rubber tree Hevea brasiliensis called corynespora leaf fall (CLF). It is one of the most economically significant fungal pathogens of rubber trees in Asia and Africa, causing "fishbone"- or "railway track"-shaped lesions on the leaves. this disease also found in cotton crop

== Management ==
In regards to detection of Corynespora cassiicola, it is useful to inspect the plant's bottom leaves while looking for ring-patterned spots that can be up to 10 mm in diameter. This pathogen is able to show symptoms on a vast host range and on several different structures. That being said, it is beneficial to additionally check the plant's roots, stems, and fruit exterior for symptoms.

There are several cultural control practices that may be useful for managing this pathogen. Before planting begins, measures should be taken for prevention. These measures include avoiding planting crops next to ones known to already have the disease. In order to do so, seedlings should be checked for these leaf spots previously mentioned. If the Corynespora cassiicola is discovered on the plant during its development, management of the disease includes removing and burning the plant's lower leaves. Additionally, it's important to ensure that there are no weeds present on the plant plots because these weeds may act as hosts and harbor the fungus. Additionally, weeds can be considered disadvantageous in a field because they work to compete against the host for nutrients. Some tactics for managing weeds include applying mulch to the soil or introducing a natural pathogen of the weed as a method of biocontrol. If the pathogen is discovered after harvesting the host, management includes burning the infected crop in the attempt to rid the disease from the environment. Furthermore, practicing plant rotation and waiting three years before replanting the host on the same land can be beneficial for pathogen prevention.

Chemical control may also be employed to promote disease prevention. Several researchers at the University of Florida conducted a study in which they tested a variety of fungicides on the pathogen. They tested 11 Corynespora cassiicola isolates and concluded that all tested isolates were highly resistant to the fungicides azoxystrobin and pyraclostrobin. This information suggests that because QoIs are not advantageous fungicides to use for Corynespora cassiicola management, fungicides with different FRAC codes may be more useful. So, farmers should consider fungicides with modes of action that are different from QoI when determining which chemical to apply.

== Environment ==
Although Corynespora cassiicola has been reportedly located in a wide distribution throughout the world, the conditions in which this pathogen best spreads and develops are found in the tropics and subtropics. The locations of these reports include plant species in American Samoa, Brazil, Malaysia, and Micronesia. Furthermore, the pathogen was reported in Mexico in 2013 and China in 2014.

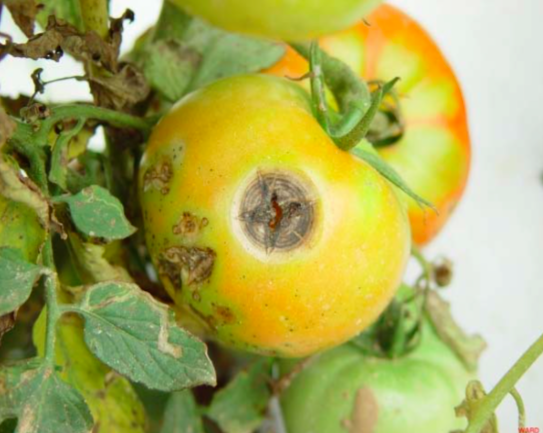
Photograph by Gary Vallad, Assistant Professor of Plant Pathology at University of Florida, Gulf Coast REC.

Corynespora cassiicola requires high humidity for infection and is additionally favored in locations with substantial periods of high moisture (16–44 hours). In other words, the leaf wetness is likely a major environmental factor driving the disease for this fungal pathogen. The humidity may be used as a surrogate for leaf wetness, as it is an essential component of an environment and has data that can be easily measured. This pathogen is an especially prominent foliar disease of tomato in Florida, which provides the optimal high humidity environment for the disease growth and development. Images of the symptoms in this opportune environment have been provided by professors of plant pathology from Florida, Dr. Ken Pernezny and Dr. Gary Vallad. In regards to the symptoms on the leaves of tomato plants, there is evidence of chlorosis as well as small, brown circular spots covering the leaves. The symptoms of the tomato fruit exterior include larger, brown circular deformations on the plant's exterior skin. These illustrations are important to note because they depict the symptoms of Corynespora cassiicola on a tomato plant that is developing in its favorable environment.

Additionally, this pathogen may be easily dispersed throughout the environment by wind. Thus, it has been found on diverse substrates of its hosts including the roots, stems, and leaves. The pathogen has even been reported on human skin, seen as causing severe damage and blisters.

== Importance ==
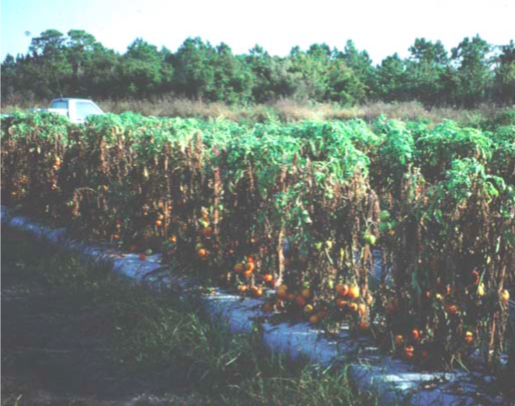
Photograph by Dr. Ken Pernezny from University of Florida.

Corynespora cassiicola is an important pathogen because it's responsible for a considerable loss of crop production and yield. This pathogen's first notorious epidemic involved the Hevea brasilienis host, also known as the Pará Rubber Tree. Approximately 4,600 hectare of this species have been destroyed in Sri Lanka since this first epidemic in 1987. Therefore, this pathogen reduces the yield of natural rubber latex in Asian and African countries especially and is thus a major threat to millions of rubber farmers.

There have been 72 documented reports of Corynespora cassiicola from 1957 until 2013. This suggests an increase in both awareness and aggressiveness for this pathogen. Moreover, Corynespora cassiicola has become a prominent disease in both in cucumbers and tomatoes. The photograph by Dr. Ken Pernezny illustrates the foliar damage of Corynespora cassiicola and the reduced yield of tomato plants in a Florida field. Thus, this pathogen has the ability to inflict major economic loss. Furthermore, Corynespora cassiicola's host range includes 530 species from 380 genera. This broad host range adds danger in the fact that this economic loss does not just apply to one specific crop. Rather, a farmer working in a field where this fungi has the opportunity to grow must care for a variety of hosts. Additionally, this reinforces the importance of gaining knowledge to better understand this pathogen and prevent it from developing.

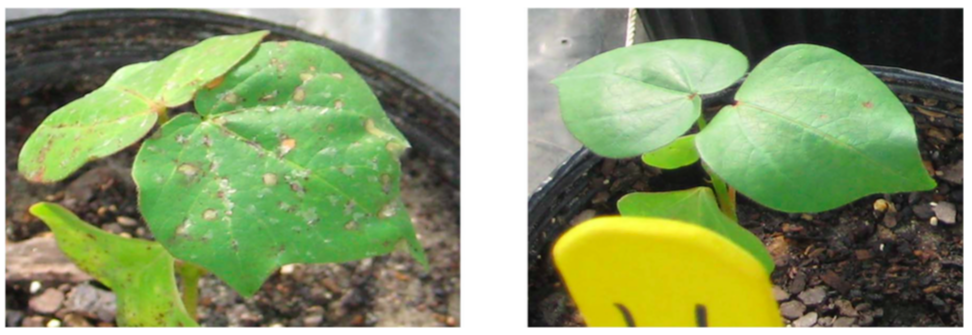
Successful proof of Koch's Postulates conducted by Abraham Fulmer in 2011at the University of Georgia. This experiment proves that the disease Tomato ring spot disease is caused by Corynespora cassiicola.

== Research ==
The fungus has been the subject of genetic analysis, which revealed that it has a high genetic diversity. Results of this variation within the species include its ability to adapt to many hosts and many environments, and its ability to cause different kinds of disease states in its host plants. Several isolates of the fungus have recently proven to be resistant to the fungicide benzimidazole, making the fungus harder to treat in crops.

Because it also infects many plants that are considered noxious weeds, the fungus has been proposed for use as a bioherbicide and an agent of biological pest control.

== See also ==
- List of soybean diseases
