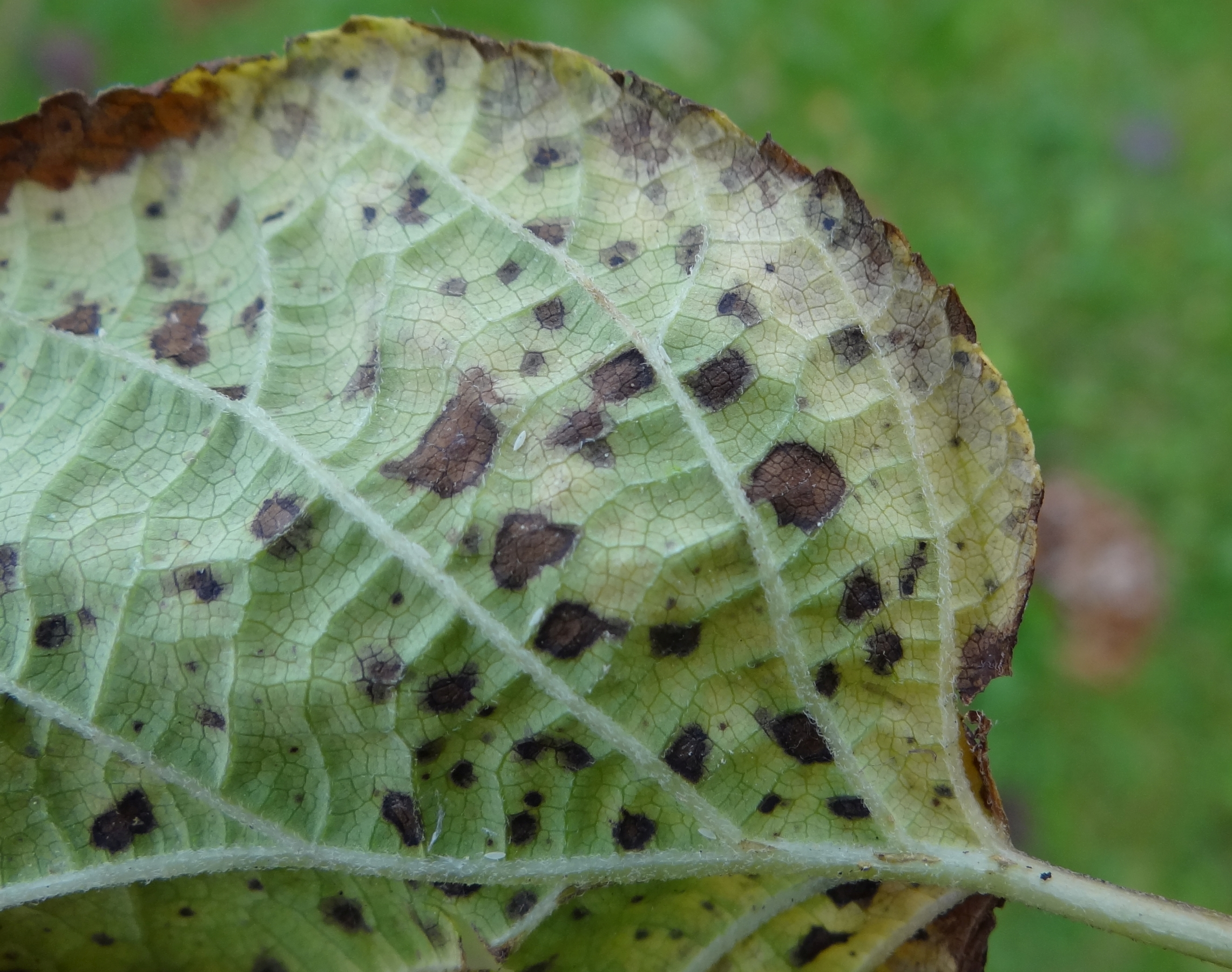
- Corynespora cassiicola on a leaf

Scientific classification
- Domain: Eukaryota
- Kingdom: Fungi
- Division: Ascomycota
- Class: Dothideomycetes
- Order: Pleosporales
- Family: Corynesporascaceae
- Genus: Corynespora

Species
- Corynespora cassiicola; Corynespora kenyensis; Corynespora laevistipitata; Corynespora ripogoni

= Corynespora =

Genus of fungi

Corynespora is a fungus genus. It is a member of the mitosporic Ascomycota, a heterogeneous group of ascomycotic fungi whose common characteristic is the absence of a sexual state.

Species in the genus induce Corynespora leaf spot in bleeding hearts (Clerodendrum thomsoniae).

== See also ==
- List of mitosporic Ascomycota
- List of bleeding heart diseases
