= List of bleeding heart diseases =

This article is a list of diseases of bleeding hearts (Clerodendrum thomsoniae).

== Fungal diseases ==
Fungal diseases
Botrytis blight	Botrytis cinerea
Cercospora leaf spot	Cercospora apii f.sp. clerodendri
Corynespora leaf spot	Corynespora sp.
Phyllosticta leaf spot	Phyllosticta sp.
Powdery mildew	Podosphaera intermedia
Pythium root rot	Pythium sp.

== Nematodes, parasitic ==
Nematodes, parasitic
Root-knot nematodes	Meloidogyne arenaria Meloidogyne incognita

== Viral and viroid diseases ==
Viral and viroid diseases
Impatiens necrotic spot	genus Tospovirus, Impatiens necrotic spot virus (INSV)
Tobacco mosaic	genus Tobamovirus, Tobacco mosaic virus (TMV)
Tobacco ringspot	genus Nepovirus, Tobacco ringspot virus (TRSV)
