= Lascaux =

Caves in France containing Paleolithic paintings

UNESCO World Heritage Site
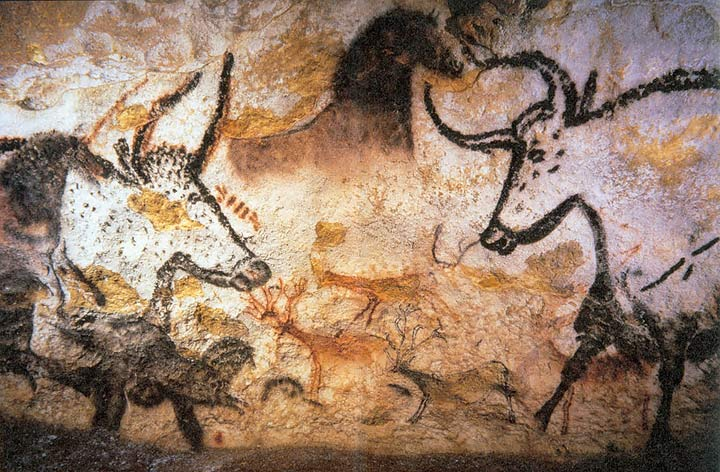
- Depiction of aurochs, horses and deer

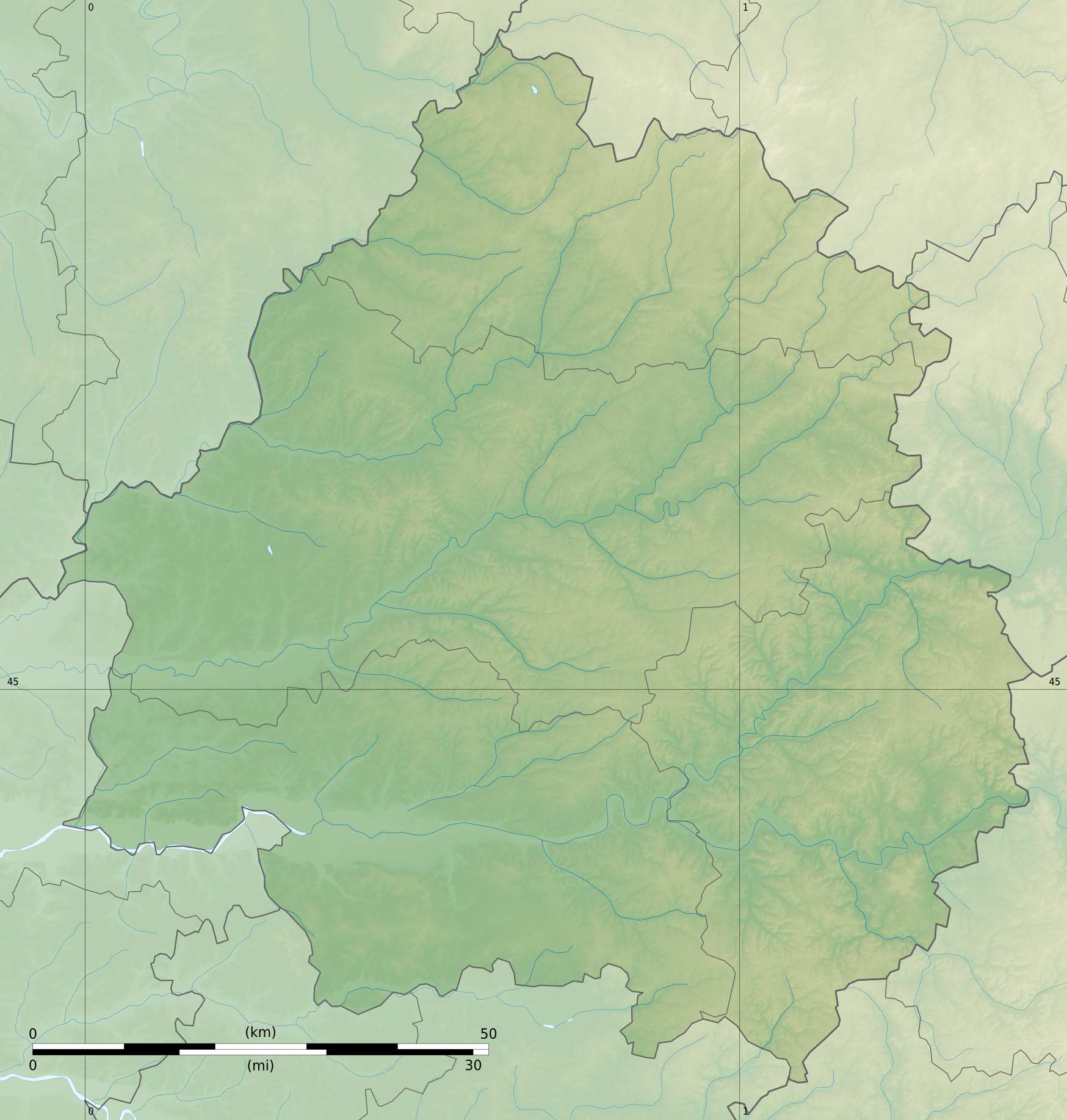
- Location within Dordogne Location within France
- Location: Montignac, France
- Part of: Prehistoric Sites and Decorated Caves of the Vézère Valley
- Criteria: Cultural: i, iii
- Reference: 85-011
- Inscription: 1979 (3rd Session)
- Area: 34.34 ha (84 7/8 acres)
- Coordinates: 45°03′13″N 1°10′12″E

Lascaux
- Interactive map of Lascaux
- Coordinates: 45°03′13″N 1°10′12″E

Lascaux (English: /læˈskoʊ/ la-SKOH, US also /lɑːˈskoʊ/ lah-SKOH; French: Grotte de Lascaux French pronunciation: [ɡʁɔt də lasko], "Lascaux Cave") is a network of caves near the village of Montignac, in the department of Dordogne in southwestern France. Over 600 parietal wall paintings cover the interior walls and ceilings of the cave. The paintings represent primarily large animals, typical local contemporary fauna that correspond with the fossil record of the Upper Paleolithic in the area. They are the combined effort of many generations.

With continued debate, the age of the paintings is now usually estimated at 17,000 to 22,000 years (early Magdalenian). Because of the outstanding prehistoric art in the cave, Lascaux was inducted into the UNESCO World Heritage List in 1979, as an element of the Prehistoric Sites and Decorated Caves of the Vézère Valley.

The original caves have been closed to the public since 1963, as their condition was quickly deteriorating, but there are now a number of replicas.

== History since rediscovery ==
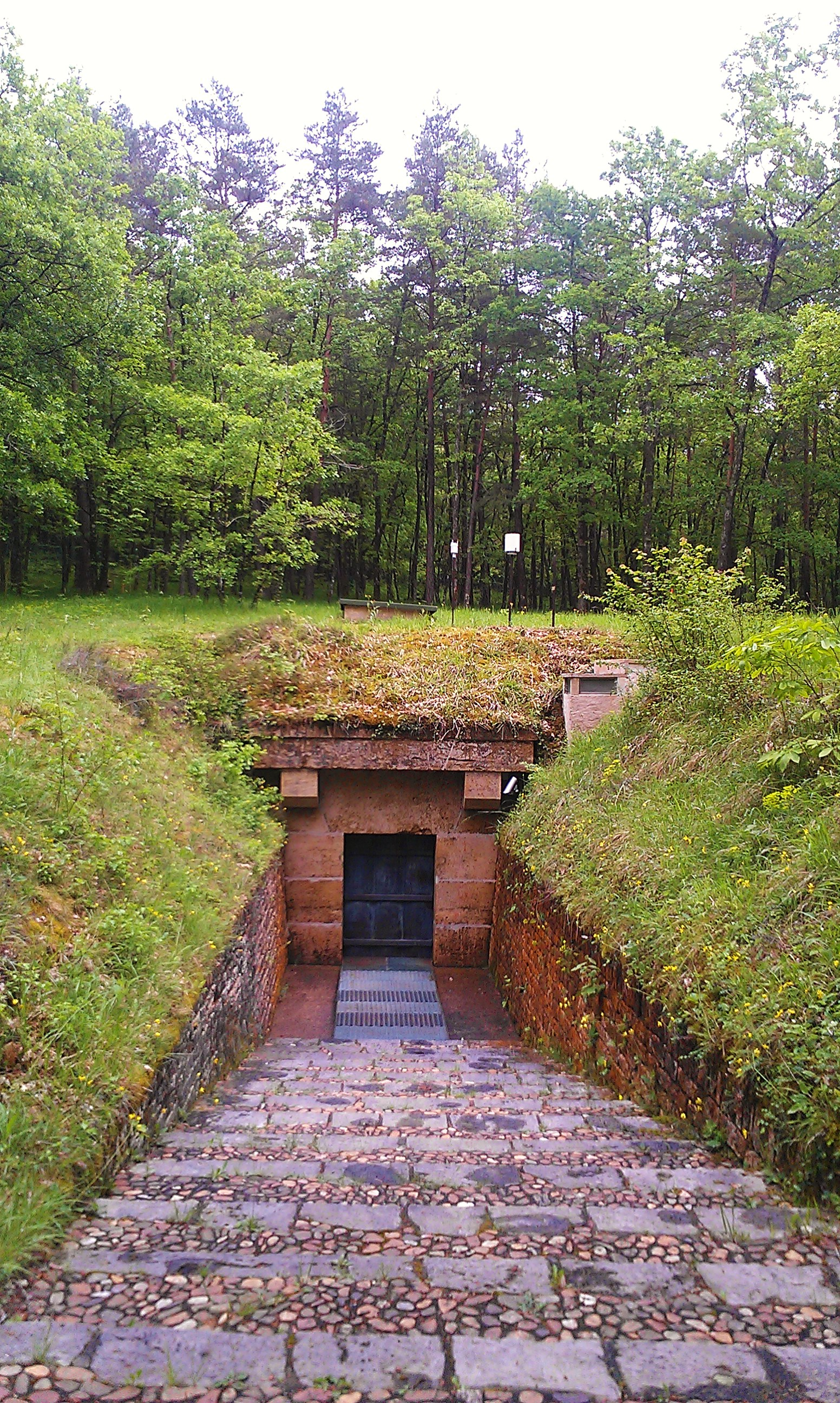
Modern entrance to the Lascaux cave

On 12 September 1940, the entrance to the Lascaux Cave was discovered on the La Rochefoucauld-Montbel lands by 18-year-old Marcel Ravidat when his dog, Robot, investigated a hole left by an uprooted tree (Ravidat would embellish the story in later retellings, saying the dog had fallen into the cave). Ravidat returned to the scene with three friends: Jacques Marsal, Georges Agnel, and Simon Coencas. They entered the cave through a 15-metre-deep (50-foot) shaft that they believed might be a legendary secret passage to the nearby Lascaux Manor.

The teenagers discovered that the cave walls were covered with depictions of animals. Galleries that suggest continuity, context or simply represent a cavern were given names. Those include the Hall of the Bulls, the Passageway, the Shaft, the Nave, the Apse, and the Chamber of Felines. They returned along with the Abbé Henri Breuil on 21 September 1940; Breuil would make many sketches of the cave, some of which are used as study material today due to the extreme degradation of many of the paintings. Breuil was accompanied by Denis Peyrony, curator of the National Museum of Prehistory at Les Eyzies, Jean Bouyssonie and Dr Cheynier.

The cave complex was opened to the public on 14 July 1948, and initial archaeological investigations began a year later, focusing on the Shaft. By 1955, carbon dioxide, heat, humidity, and other contaminants produced by 1,200 visitors per day had visibly damaged the paintings. As air condition deteriorated, fungi and lichen increasingly infested the walls. Consequently, the cave was closed to the public in 1963, the paintings were restored to their original state, and a monitoring system on a daily basis was introduced.

=== Replicas ===
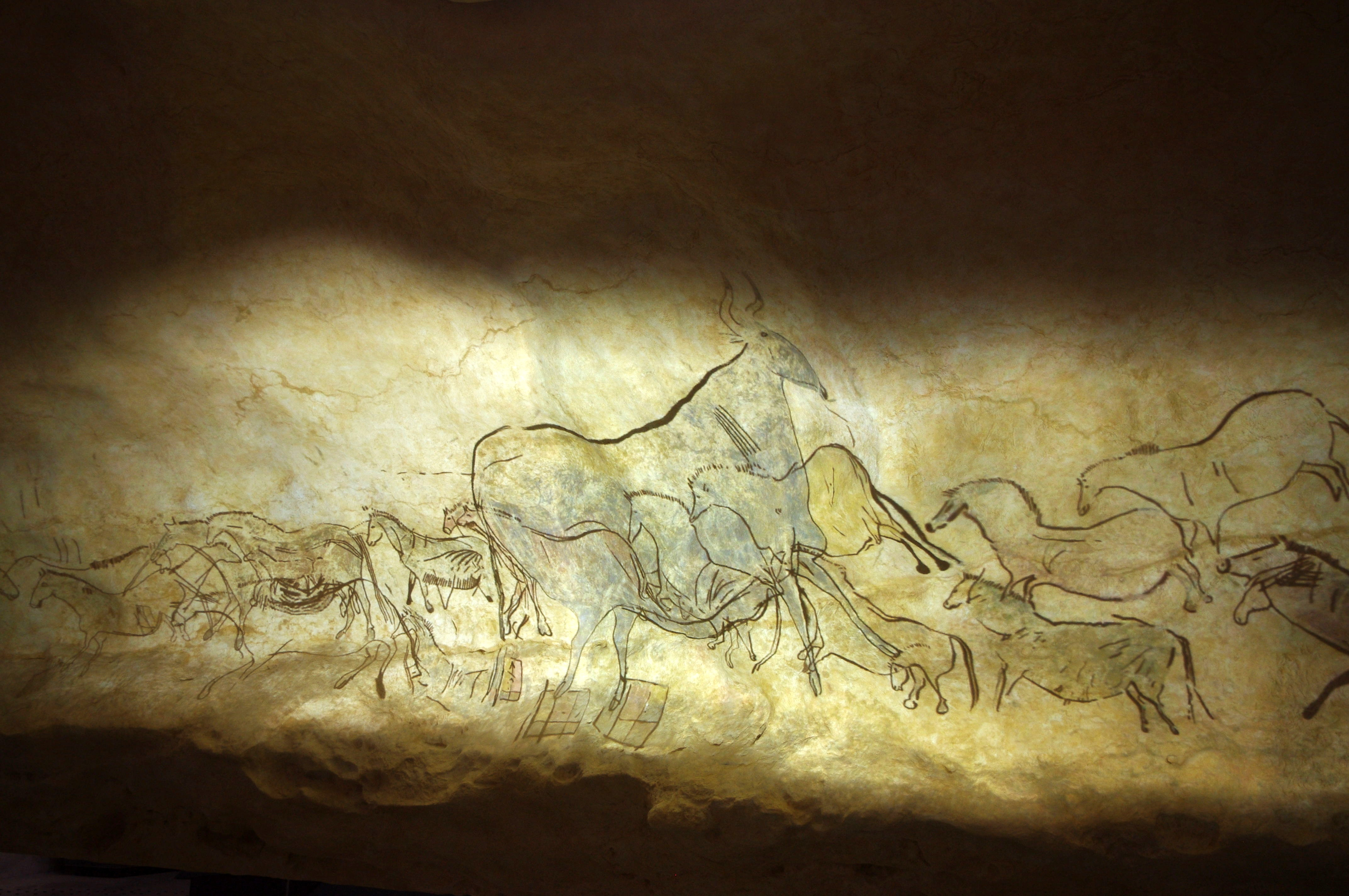
Part of Lascaux IV

Conservation problems, such as protecting crystal growth and conserving the paintings in the original cave, have made the creation of replicas open to the public more important.

==== Lascaux II ====
Lascaux II, an exact copy of the Great Hall of the Bulls and the Painted Gallery was displayed at the Grand Palais in Paris, before being displayed from 1983 in the cave's vicinity (about 200 m or 660 ft away from the original cave), a compromise and attempt to present an impression of the paintings' scale and composition for the public without harming the originals. A full range of Lascaux's parietal art is presented a few kilometres from the site at the Centre of Prehistoric Art, Le Parc du Thot, where there are also live animals representing ice-age fauna.

The paintings for this site were duplicated with the same type of materials (such as iron oxide, charcoal, and ochre) which were believed to be used 19,000 years ago. Other facsimiles of Lascaux have also been produced over the years.

==== Lascaux III ====
Lascaux III is a series of five exact reproductions of the cave art (the Nave and Shaft) that, since 2012, have been exhibited in various countries, allowing knowledge of Lascaux to be shared widely, far away from the original.

==== Lascaux IV ====
Lascaux IV is the latest replica, in real scale, of the integrality of the cave of Lascaux. Situated on the same hill overlooking Montignac, and 400 m (440 yd) from the original site, it is part of the International Centre for Parietal Art (Centre International de l'Art Pariétal) that was inaugurated in December 2016. The museum, built by Snøhetta, integrates digital technology, workshops and films into adjacent display rooms.

== Geographic setting ==
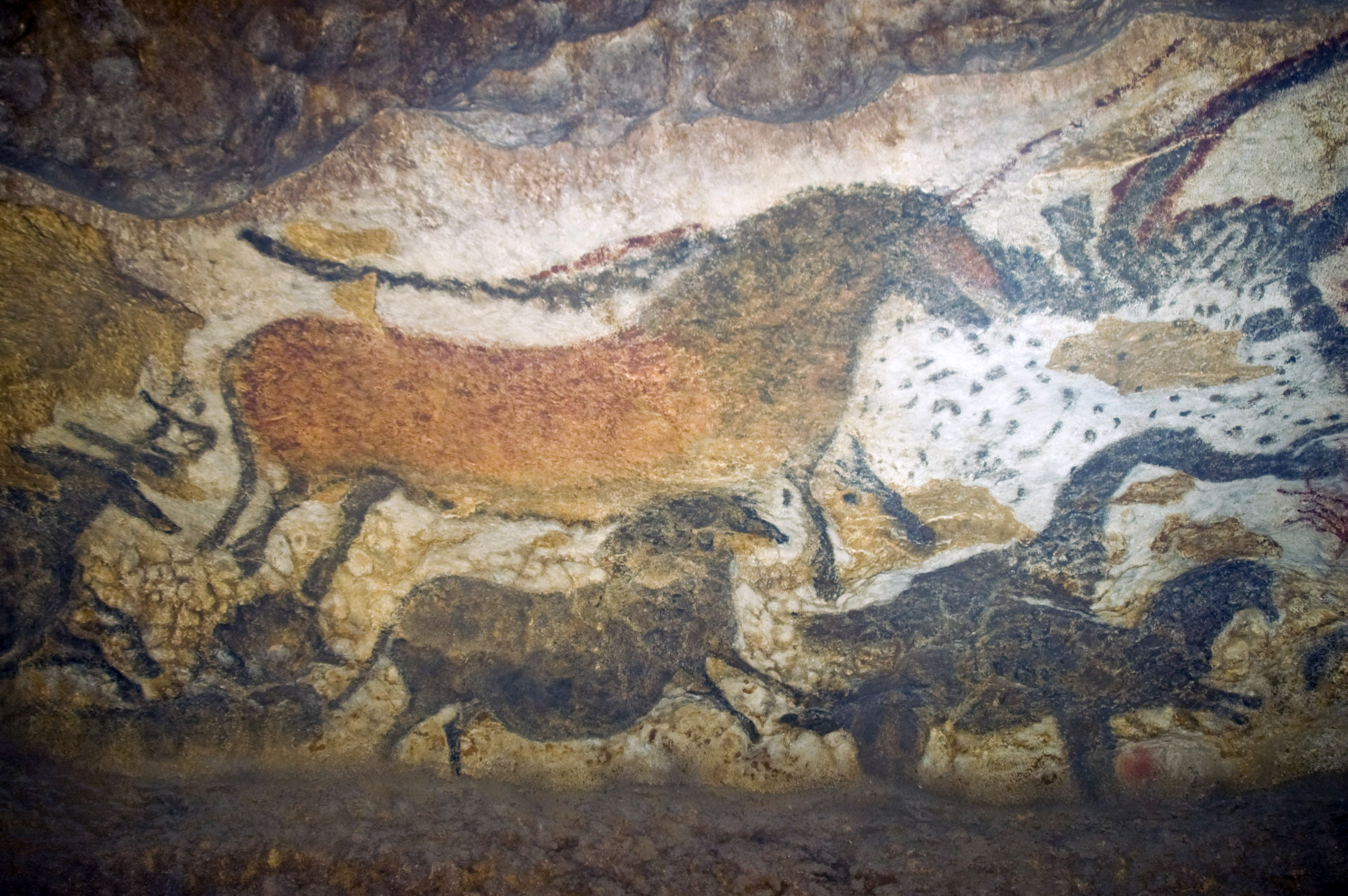
Reproduction of Lascaux artwork in Lascaux II

In its sedimentary composition, the Vézère drainage basin covers one fourth of the département of the Dordogne, the northernmost region of the Black Périgord. Before joining the Dordogne River near Limeuil, the Vézère flows in a south-westerly direction. At its centre point, the river's course is marked by a series of meanders flanked by high limestone cliffs that determine the landscape. Upstream from this steep-sloped relief, near Montignac and in the vicinity of Lascaux, the contours of the land soften considerably; the valley floor widens, and the banks of the river lose their steepness.

The Lascaux valley is located some distance from the major concentrations of decorated caves and inhabited sites, most of which were discovered further downstream. In the environs of the village of Eyzies-de-Tayac Sireuil, there are no fewer than 37 decorated caves and shelters, as well as an even greater number of habitation sites from the Upper Paleolithic, located in the open, beneath a sheltering overhang, or at the entrance to one of the area's karst cavities. This is the highest concentration in Europe.

== Images ==
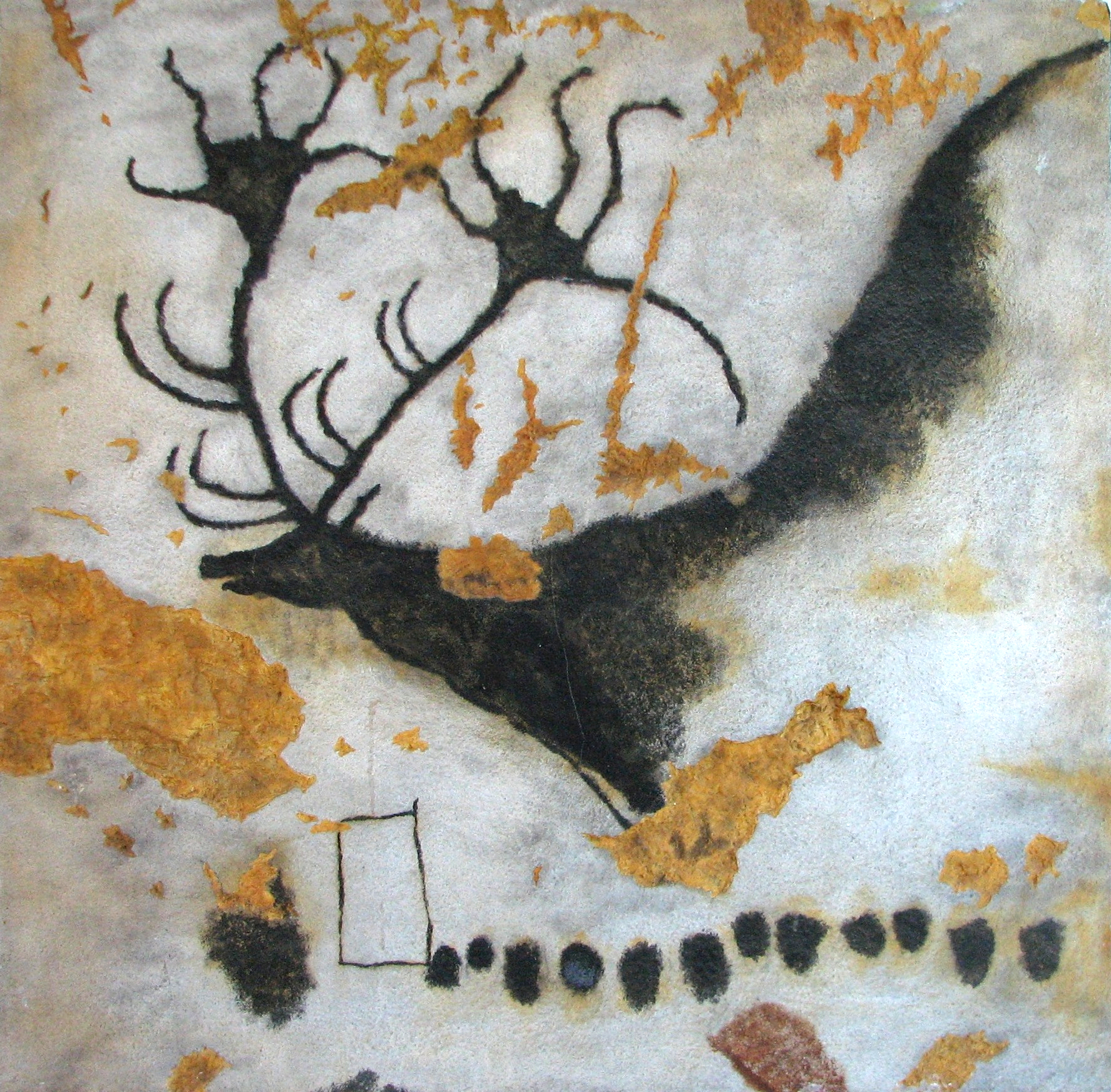
Irish elk (Megaloceros giganteus) with line of dots

The cave contains nearly 6,000 figures, which can be grouped into three main categories: animals, human figures, and abstract signs. The paintings contain no images of the surrounding landscape or the vegetation of the time. Most of the major images have been painted onto the walls using red, yellow, and black colours from a complex multiplicity of mineral pigments including iron compounds such as iron oxide (ochre), hematite, and goethite, as well as manganese-containing pigments. Charcoal may also have been used but seemingly to a sparing extent.

On some of the cave walls, the colour may have been applied as a suspension of pigment in either animal fat or calcium-rich cave groundwater or clay, making paint, that was swabbed or blotted on, rather than applied by brush. In other areas, the colour was applied by spraying the pigments by blowing the mixture through a tube. Where the rock surface is softer, some designs have been incised into the stone. Many images are too faint to discern, and others have deteriorated entirely.

Over 900 can be identified as animals, and 605 of these have been precisely identified. Out of these images, there are 364 paintings of equines as well as 90 paintings of stags. Also represented are aurochs and bison, each representing 4 to 5% of the images. A smattering of other images includes seven felines, a bird, a bear, a rhinoceros. In the deepest reaches of the cave, at the bottom of a 9m-deep well, the only human figure of the cave was depicted, in a strikingly different style. There are no images of reindeer, even though that was the principal source of food for the artists, and no image of fish either. Geometric images have also been found on the walls.

The most famous section of the cave is The Hall of the Bulls where bulls, equines, aurochs, stags, and the only bear in the cave are depicted. The four black auroch bulls are the dominant figures among the 36 animals represented here. One of the bulls is 5.2 m (17 ft) long, the largest animal discovered so far in cave art. Additionally, the bulls appear to be in motion.

A painting referred to as "The Crossed Bison", found in the chamber called the Nave, demonstrates some of the earliest use of occlusion and transparency in human art. Two bison are depicted tail to tail. One in the foreground and one in the background. The back legs of one bison overlaps with the other to create the illusion of depth. Their rear quarters also overlap and express some transparency due to a curve outlining the rear of the background bison. Occlusion and transparency can be found in other works in Lascaux, but also in earlier works, 30 kya, in Chauvet Cave, and occlusion was fully realized by at least Egyptian era works. The developing artistic skills seen in the caves, along with the use of shadow in classical art, eventually led to the development of perspective during the Renaissance. In the mid-20th century, Pablo Picasso visited Lascaux Caves and famously said upon exiting that "we have learned nothing in twelve thousand years".

=== Parietal representation ===
The Hall of the Bulls presents the most spectacular composition of Lascaux. Its calcite walls are not suitable for engraving, so it is only decorated with paintings, often of impressive dimensions: some are up to five metres (16 ft) long.

Two rows of aurochs face each other, two on one side and three on the other. The two aurochs on the north side are accompanied by about ten horses and a large enigmatic animal, with two straight lines on its forehead that earned it the nickname "unicorn". On the south side, three large aurochs are next to three smaller ones, painted red, as well as six small deer and the only bear in the cave, superimposed on the belly of an aurochs and difficult to read.

The Axial Diverticulum is also decorated with aurochs and horses accompanied by deer and ibex. A drawing of a fleeing horse was brushed with manganese pencil 2.50 m (8.2 feet) above the ground. Some animals are painted on the ceiling and seem to roll from one wall to the other. These representations, which required the use of scaffolding, are intertwined with many signs (sticks, dots, and rectangular signs).

The Passage has a highly degraded decoration, notably through air circulation.

The Nave has four groups of figures: the Empreinte panel, the Black Cow panel, the Deer swimming panel, and the Crossed Buffalo panel. These works are accompanied by many enigmatic geometric signs, including coloured checkers that H. Breuil called "coats of arms".

The Feline Diverticulum owes its name to a group of felines, one of which seems to urinate to mark its territory. Very difficult to access, one can see there engravings of wild animals of a rather naive style. There are also other animals associated with signs, including a representation of a horse seen from the front, exceptional in Paleolithic art where animals are generally represented in profiles or from a "twisted perspective".

The Apse contains more than a thousand engravings, some of which are superimposed on paintings, corresponding to animals and signs. There is the only reindeer represented in Lascaux.

The Well presents the most enigmatic scene of Lascaux: an ithyphallic man with a bird's head seems to lie on the ground, perhaps knocked down by a buffalo gutted by a spear; at his side is represented an elongated object surmounted by a bird, on the left a rhinoceros moves away. Various interpretations of what is represented have been offered. A horse is also present on the opposite wall. Two groups of signs are to be noted in this composition:

- between man and rhinos, three pairs of digitized punctuation marks found at the bottom of the Cat Diverticulum, in the most remote part of the cave;
- under man and bison, a complex barbed sign that can be found almost identically on other walls of the cave, and also on paddle points and on the sandstone lamp found nearby.

=== Interpretation ===
The interpretation of Palaeolithic Art is problematic, as it can be influenced by our own prejudices and beliefs. Some anthropologists and art historians theorize the paintings could be an account of past hunting success, or could represent a mystical ritual in order to improve future hunting endeavors. The latter theory is supported by the overlapping images of one group of animals in the same cave location as another group of animals, suggesting that one area of the cave was more successful for predicting a plentiful hunting excursion.

Applying the iconographic method of analysis to the Lascaux paintings (studying position, direction and size of the figures; organization of the composition; painting technique; distribution of the color planes; research of the image center), Thérèse Guiot-Houdart attempted to comprehend the symbolic function of the animals, to identify the theme of each image and finally to reconstitute the canvas of the myth illustrated on the rock walls.

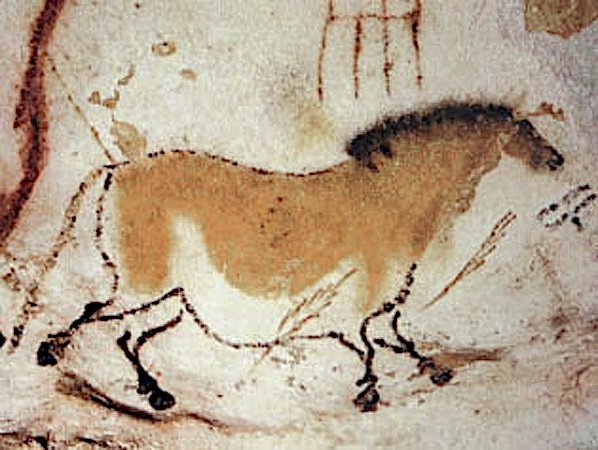
Cave painting of a dun horse (Equus ferus) at Lascaux

Julien d'Huy and Jean-Loïc Le Quellec showed that certain angular or barbed signs of Lascaux may be analysed as "weapon" or "wounds". These signs affect dangerous animals – big cats, aurochs, and bison – more than others and may be explained by a fear of the animation of the image. Another finding supports the hypothesis of half-alive images. At Lascaux, bison, aurochs, and ibex are not represented side by side. Conversely, one can note a bison-horses-lions system and an aurochs-horses-deer-bears system, these animals being frequently associated. Such a distribution may show the relationship between the species pictured and their environmental conditions. Aurochs and bison fight one against the other, and horses and deer are very social with other animals. Bison and lions live in open plains areas; aurochs, deer and bears are associated with forests and marshes; ibex habitat is rocky areas, and horses are highly adaptive for all these areas. The Lascaux paintings' disposition may be explained by a belief in the real life of the pictured species, wherein the artists tried to respect their real environmental conditions.

Less known is the image area called the Abside (Apse), a roundish, semi-spherical chamber similar to an apse in a Romanesque basilica. It is approximately 4.5 m (5 yd) and covered on every wall surface (including the ceiling) with thousands of entangled, overlapping, engraved drawings. The ceiling of the Apse, which ranges from 1.6 to 2.7 metres (5 to 9 ft) as measured from the original floor height, is so completely decorated with such engravings that it indicates that the prehistoric people who executed them first constructed a scaffold to do so.

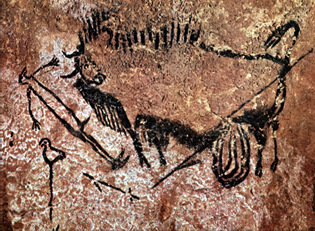
The famous shaft scene of Lascaux: a man with a bird head and a bison

According to David Lewis-Williams and Jean Clottes who both studied presumably similar art of the San people of Southern Africa, this type of art is spiritual in nature relating to visions experienced during ritualistic trance-dancing. These trance visions are a function of the human imagination and so are independent of geographical location. Nigel Spivey, a professor of classical art and archeology at the University of Cambridge, has further postulated in his series, How Art Made the World, that dot and lattice patterns overlapping the representational images of animals are very similar to hallucinations provoked by sensory-deprivation. He further postulates that the connections between culturally important animals and these hallucinations led to the invention of image-making, or the art of drawing.

André Leroi-Gourhan studied the cave from the 1960s; his observation of the associations of animals and the distribution of species within the cave led him to develop a Structuralist theory that posited the existence of a genuine organization of the graphic space in Palaeolithic sanctuaries. This model is based on a masculine/feminine duality – which can be particularly observed in the bison/horse and aurochs/horse pairs – identifiable in both the signs and the animal representations. He also defined an ongoing evolution through four consecutive styles, from the Aurignacian to the Late Magdalenian. Leroi-Gourhan did not publish a detailed analysis of the cave's figures. In his work Préhistoire de l'art occidental, published in 1965, he nonetheless put forward an analysis of certain signs and applied his explanatory model to the understanding of other decorated caves.

== Threats ==
The conservation room at Lascaux

The opening of Lascaux Cave after World War II changed the cave environment. The exhalations of 1,200 visitors per day, presence of light, and changes in air circulation have created a number of problems. Lichens and crystals began to appear on the walls in the late 1950s, leading to closure of the caves in 1963. This led to restriction of access to the real caves to a few visitors every week, and the creation of a replica cave for visitors to Lascaux. In 2001, the authorities in charge of Lascaux changed the air conditioning system which resulted in regulation of the temperature and humidity. When the system had been established, an infestation of Fusarium solani, a white mold, began spreading rapidly across the cave ceiling and walls. The mold is considered to have been present in the cave soil and exposed by the work of tradesmen, leading to the spread of the fungus which was treated with quicklime. In 2007, a new fungus, which has created grey and black blemishes, began spreading in the real cave.

As of 2008, the cave contained black mold. In January 2008, authorities closed the cave for three months, even to scientists and preservationists. A single individual was allowed to enter the cave for twenty minutes once a week to monitor climatic conditions. Now only a few scientific experts are allowed to work inside the cave and just for a few days a month, but the efforts to remove the mold have taken a toll, leaving dark patches and damaging the pigments on the walls. In 2009 the mold problem was pronounced stable. In 2011 the fungus seemed to be in retreat after the introduction of an additional, even stricter conservation program. Two research programs have been instigated at the CIAP concerning how to best treat the problem, and the cave also now possesses a climatisation system designed to reduce the introduction of bacteria.

Organized through the initiative of the French Ministry of Culture, an international symposium titled "Lascaux and Preservation Issues in Subterranean Environments" was held in Paris on 26 and 27 February 2009, under the chairmanship of Jean Clottes. It brought together nearly three hundred participants from seventeen countries with the goal of confronting research and interventions conducted in Lascaux Cave since 2001 with the experiences gained in other countries in the domain of preservation in subterranean environments. The proceedings of this symposium were published in 2011. Seventy-four specialists in fields as varied as biology, biochemistry, botany, hydrology, climatology, geology, fluid mechanics, archaeology, anthropology, restoration and conservation, from numerous countries (France, United States, Portugal, Spain, Japan, and others) contributed to this publication.

In May 2018 Scolecobasidium lascauxense, a species of fungus of the Ascomycota phylum, was officially described and named after the place of its first emergence and isolation, the Lascaux cave. This followed on from the discovery of another closely related species Scolecobasidium anomalum, first observed inside the cave in 2000. The following year black spots began to appear among the cave paintings. No official announcement on the effect or progress of attempted treatments has ever been made.

The problem is ongoing, as are efforts to control the microbial and fungal growths in the cave. The fungal infection crises have led to the establishment of an International Scientific Committee for Lascaux and to rethinking how, and how much, human access should be permitted in caves containing prehistoric art.

== In popular culture ==
The British classical music composer Alan Bush visited the cave in 1982, and, inspired by it, wrote his fourth and last symphony ("Lascaux Symphony"). The symphony imagines how the concept of artistic expression itself arose in prehistoric societies.

Georges Bataille wrote a book about the paintings, Lascaux; or the Birth of Art: Prehistoric Painting. Engaging with Bataille, Maurice Blanchot examines the paintings' appeal in L'Amitié.

== See also ==
- Art of the Upper Paleolithic
- Cave of Altamira
- Chauvet Cave
- Cave painting
- List of archaeological sites by country
- List of caves
- List of Stone Age art
- Prehistoric art
- The Thread of Art, 2012 and 2015 book
