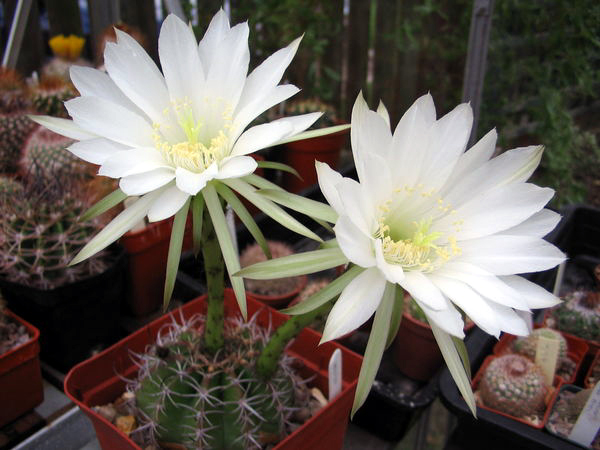

Scientific classification
- Kingdom: Plantae
- Clade: Tracheophytes
- Clade: Angiosperms
- Clade: Eudicots
- Order: Caryophyllales
- Family: Cactaceae
- Subfamily: Cactoideae
- Genus: Echinopsis
- Species: E. albispinosa

Binomial name
- Echinopsis albispinosa K.Schum.

Synonyms
- Echinopsis albispinosa var. fuauxiana Backeb.; Echinopsis aurea var. callochrysea (F.Ritter) J.Ullmann; Echinopsis boyuibensis F.Ritter; Echinopsis callochrysea (F.Ritter) Lodé; Echinopsis fallax var. callochrysea (F.Ritter) Lambinon; Echinopsis silvestrii Speg.; Echinopsis tubiflora subsp. callochrysea (F.Ritter) Schlumpb.; Hymenorebutia aurea var. callochrysea F.Ritter; Lobivia aurea var. callochrysea (F.Ritter) Rausch; Lobivia boyuibensis (F.Ritter) Schlumpb.; Lobivia callochrysea (F.Ritter) Lodé; Pseudolobivia boyuibensis (F.Ritter) Backeb.

= Echinopsis albispinosa =

Species of cactus

Echinopsis albispinosa is a species of cactus from Argentina. Although Echinopsis sylvestrii is a synonym of this species, it should not be confused with Chamaecereus silvestrii, which has a very different appearance.

== Description ==
Echinopsis albispinosa usually grows singly, but occasionally branches and then forms small groups. The spherical to short cylindrical shoots reach heights of 5 to 10 cm (2.0 to 3.9 in) with diameters of 4 to 8 cm (1.6 to 3.1 in). There are twelve to 14 ribs. The circular areoles on them are whitish. The single central spine protrudes. The five to nine marginal spines lie on the surface of the shoot.

The long, tube-shaped, funnel-shaped, white flowers have no scent. They open at night. The flowers are up to 20 cm (7.9 in) long.

== Distribution ==
Echinopsis albispinosa is widespread in the Argentine provinces of Salta and Tucumán at lower altitudes of 500 to 1000 meters.

== Taxonomy ==
The first description by Carlos Luis Spegazzini was published in 1905.
