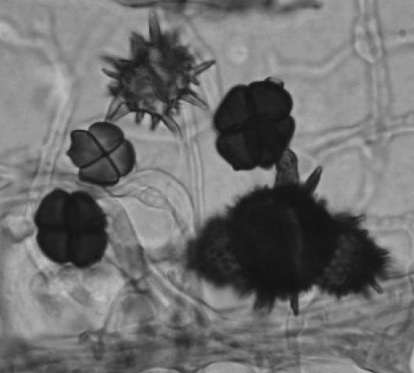
- Spegazzinia tessarthra

Scientific classification
- Domain: Eukaryota
- Kingdom: Fungi
- Division: Ascomycota
- Class: Dothideomycetes
- Order: Pleosporales
- Family: Didymosphaeriaceae
- Genus: Spegazzinia; Sacc. (1880)

Type species
- Spegazzinia ornata Speg. (1880)

Species
- See text

= Spegazzinia =

Genus of fungi

Spegazzinia is also a synonym of the cactus genus Weingartia.

Spegazzinia is a genus of widely distributed mitosporic ascomycete fungi in the family Didymosphaeriaceae.As accepted by Wijayawardene et al. 2020.

It was earlier placed in the family Apiosporaceae in 2008. This genus is somewhat related to other lobed or ornamented genera, such as Candelabrum. No information is available regarding health effects, toxicity, or allergenicity. The distinctive spores of Spegazzinia are occasionally identified on spore trap samples. It may also be found in the air by culturable (Andersen) samples if a long enough incubation period is provided so that sporulation occurs. Laboratories have never found this organism growing on indoor environmental surfaces. Natural habitat includes soil and many kinds of trees and other plants.

The genus was circumscribed by Pier Andrea Saccardo in 1880, in Rev. Mycol. (Toulouse) vol. 2, page 140. The genus name of Spegazzinia is in honour of Carlo Luigi Spegazzini, (in Spanish Carlos Luis Spegazzini; 1858–1926), an Italian-born Argentinian botanist and mycologist.

== Taxonomy ==
=== Species ===
The following species are accepted by Species Fungorum:

- Spegazzinia affinis J. Mena & Cantillo (2017)
- Spegazzinia bromeliacearum S.S. Nascimento & J.D.P. Bezerra (2019)
- Spegazzinia camelliae N. Suwannarach, J. Kumla & S. Lumyong (2021)
- Spegazzinia cruciata Whitton, K.D. Hyde & McKenzie (2012)
- Spegazzinia deightonii (S. Hughes) Subram. (1956)
- Spegazzinia flabellata S.M. Leão & Gusmão (2010)
- Spegazzinia intermedia M.B. Ellis (1976)
- Spegazzinia lobulata Thrower (1954)
- Spegazzinia neosundara Thambug. & K.D. Hyde (2017)
- Spegazzinia parkeri Sivasith. (1974)
- Spegazzinia radermacherae Jayasiri, E.B.G. Jones & K.D. Hyde (2019)
- Spegazzinia subramanianii Bhat (1994)
- Spegazzinia sundara Subram. (1956)
- Spegazzinia tessarthra (Berk. & M.A. Curtis) Sacc. (1886)
- Spegazzinia xanthorrhoeae Subram. (1988)

=== Former taxa ===
The following taxa were formally recognised:

- S. lobata (Berk. & Broome) Höhn. (1903) = Sporidesmium lobatum (family Pleosporomycetidae)
- S. ornata Sacc. (1880) = Spegazzinia tessarthra
- S. tessarthra var. deightonii S. Hughes (1953) = Spegazzinia deightonii
- S. trichophila G.F. Atk. (1897) = Isthmospora trichophila (family Microthyriaceae)
