= Scolecobasidium ailanthi =

Scientific classification
- Domain: Eukaryota
- Kingdom: Fungi
- Division: Ascomycota
- Class: Dothideomycetes
- Order: Venturiales
- Family: Sympoventuriaceae
- Genus: Scolecobasidium
- Species: S. ailanthi

Binomial name
- Scolecobasidium ailanthi (Jayasiri, E.B.G. Jones & K.D. Hyde) Crous

Synonyms
- Ochroconis ailanthi Jayasiri, E.B.G. Jones & K.D. Hyde

Species of fungus

Scolecobasidium ailanthi is a species of fungus in the genus Scolecobasidium.

== Description ==
This fungus is characterized by a grayish black color, and spread out microscopic fronds. Its spores are sometimes split looking like seeds under a microscope.
