= Scolecobasidium lascauxense =

Scientific classification
- Kingdom: Fungi
- Division: Ascomycota
- Class: Dothideomycetes
- Order: Venturiales
- Family: Sympoventuriaceae
- Genus: Scolecobasidium
- Species: S. lascauxense

Binomial name
- Scolecobasidium lascauxense (A. Nováková & Mart.-Sánch.) G.Y. Sun & Lu Hao, 2012

Synonyms
- Ochroconis lascauxensis A.Nováková & Mart.-Sánch.

Species of fungus

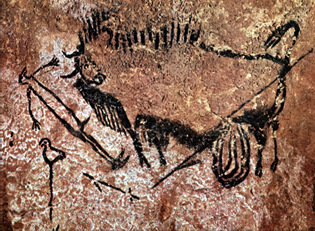
An example of the cave paintings found in Lascaux Cave

Scolecobasidium lascauxense is a species of fungus of the Ascomycota phylum that was officially described in May 2012. The organism was obtained and isolated from Lascaux Cave in France, where it had begun appearing on the Paleolithic cave paintings on the walls of the cave. Along with the discovery of Scolecobasidium lascauxense, the closely related Scolecobasidium anomalum was also discovered on the paintings. The black stains that they caused first began being observed in 2001 and spread so far that they were considered to be a large concern by 2007.

Along with its sibling species, Scolecobasidium lascauxense was selected on May 22, 2013, by the International Institute for Species Exploration, located at Arizona State University, as one of the "Top 10 New Species" that had been discovered in 2012. The winners were selected from among a pool of more than 140 nominees. The two fungi were chosen because of their importance in relation to properly conserving the cave painting at Lascaux.

== History ==
After first being observed in the early 2000s, a number of treatments involving biocides were conducted to try to remove the fungal species, though they ultimately proved ineffective. The species was identified by using a genomic DNA study to compare its genetic structure to those of other species within the genus Ochroconis. Once confirmed, a method using a PCR assay was done to determine how extensive the species had spread throughout the cave system. It was ultimately determined that Ochroconis lascauxensis was to be found in every cave compartment within Lascaux Cave.

A biocide treatment was attempted, involving benzalkonium chloride, miristalkonium chloride, and 2-octyl-2H-isothiazole-3-one, which resulted in a net decrease of fifty percent of the fungus in the caves, but it was noted that those left had a significant increase in their diversity.
