= Scolecobasidium anomalum =

Scientific classification
- Kingdom: Fungi
- Division: Ascomycota
- Class: Dothideomycetes
- Order: Venturiales
- Family: Sympoventuriaceae
- Genus: Scolecobasidium
- Species: S. anomalum

Binomial name
- Scolecobasidium anomalum (A. Nováková & Mart.-Sánch.) G.Y. Sun & Lu Hao, 2012

Species of fungus

Scolecobasidium anomalum is a species of fungus of the Ascomycota group described in 2012. It was isolated from the black stains that appeared on the walls of Lascaux Cave in France. The species was discovered along with a closely related S. lascauxense. The species are regarded as a threat to the prehistoric paintings of the cave.

The fungus was honoured as one of the "Top 10 New Species" discovered in 2012 selected by the International Institute for Species Exploration at Arizona State University among more than 140 nominated species. The uniqueness is its recent emergence and serious threat to the cave painting. The selection was declared on 22 May 2013.

== Discovery and description ==
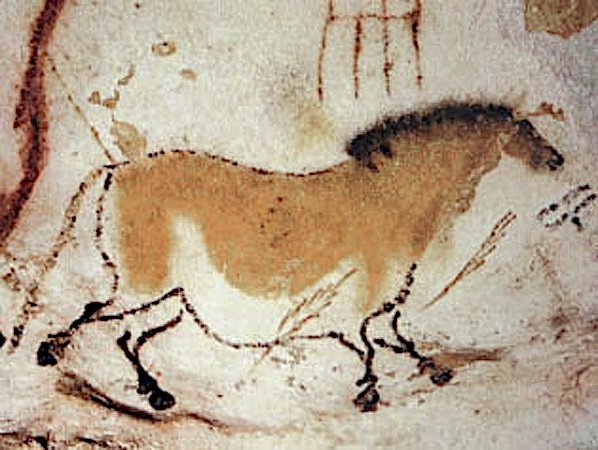
An example of the cave painting in the Lascaux Cave

The Lascaux Cave is a UNESCO World Heritage Site containing Upper Paleolithic paintings that are about 17,000 years old. The cave wall was extensively defaced by an outbreak of a white mould Fusarium solani in 2001. The fungus was considered to have been present in the cave soil, and became exposed and spread particularly by the workers. The invasive species was immediately treated with quicklime and complete control was achieved only in 2004, after regular treatment for three years. Surprisingly, only after four months of initial biocide treatment in 2001, among the white mould appeared some conspicuous black stains, which progressively disseminated on the walls and ceiling of the cave. These black stains were so prominent by 2007 that they became the cave's major problems and threat to the loss of the prehistoric art. The human-pathogenic fungal community was rapidly spreading, mostly due to the cave arthropods. Biocides were again applied since January 2008, but were not effective in annihilating the new fungi; on the contrary, they appeared to increase the fungal diversity. This was obvious because the microbial analysis in 2010 revealed completely different fungal communities. Mycological study in 2012 revealed that the black stains of the cave consisted of two species of fungi belonging to Ochroconis which are not human-pathogenic. Based on morphological and molecular description, the species were named Ochroconis lascauxensis and O. anomala. The spores of O. anomala are elliptical in shape and about 5–8 μm long. The species description was based on the phylogenetic comparison of the transcribed spacer (ITS) and RNA polymerase II subunit B (RPB2) using maximum likelihood method and by applying the Hasegawa–Kishino–Yano model based on a comparison of 1,062 nucleotides. In addition, the cellular fatty acid profiles showed that the development of these species was likely linked to the presence of unusual carbon and nitrogen organic sources provided by the intensive biocide application.

== Significance ==
Scolecobasidium anomalum is a major concern for the conservation of precious rock art at Lascaux. It may eventually lead to complete destruction of the prehistoric painting and abrogation of the cave as an international heritage. The fungus is potentially harmless to human health. A related species, Ochroconis gallopava, causes a disease of poultry.
