= Scolecobasidium =

Scientific classification
- Kingdom: Fungi
- Division: Ascomycota
- Class: Dothideomycetes
- Order: Venturiales
- Family: Sympoventuriaceae
- Genus: Scolecobasidium; E.V. Abbott

Genus of fungi

Scolecobasidium is a genus of fungi belonging to the family Sympoventuriaceae.

The genus has cosmopolitan distribution.

== Species ==
Species:

- Scolecobasidium ailanthi Jayasiri, E.B.G.Jones & K.D.Hyde
- Scolecobasidium anomalum (A. Nováková & Mart.-Sánch.) G.Y. Sun & Lu Hao
- Scolecobasidium aquaticum Samerp., Gloyna, van den Ende & de Hoog
- Scolecobasidium constrictum Chan, Yew, Na, Tan, Lee, Yee, Ngeow & Ng
- Scolecobasidium lascauxense (A. Nováková & Mart.-Sánch.) G.Y. Sun & Lu Hao
