= Humicola =

Scientific classification
- Domain: Eukaryota
- Kingdom: Fungi
- Division: Ascomycota
- Class: Sordariomycetes
- Order: Sordariales
- Family: Chaetomiaceae
- Genus: Humicola; Traaen, 1914

Genus of fungi

Humicola is a genus of fungi belonging to the family Chaetomiaceae.

The genus has cosmopolitan distribution.

== Species ==
Species:

- Humicola alopallonella Meyers & R.T.Moore
- Humicola ampulliella (X.Wei Wang) X.Wei Wang & Houbraken
- Humicola asteroidea Udagawa & Y.Horie
