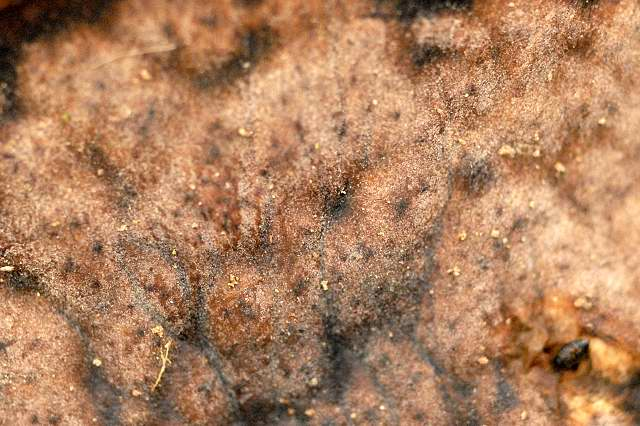
- Calcarisporium.arbuscula, Belgium

Scientific classification
- Kingdom: Fungi
- Division: Ascomycota
- Class: Sordariomycetes
- Order: Hypocreales
- Family: Calcarisporiaceae
- Genus: Calcarisporium; Preuss (1851)

Type species
- Calcarisporium arbuscula Preuss (1851)

= Calcarisporium =

Genus of fungi

Calcarisporium is a genus of fungi in the order Hypocreales. Species are typically fungicolous, parasitizing other fungal fruit bodies.
