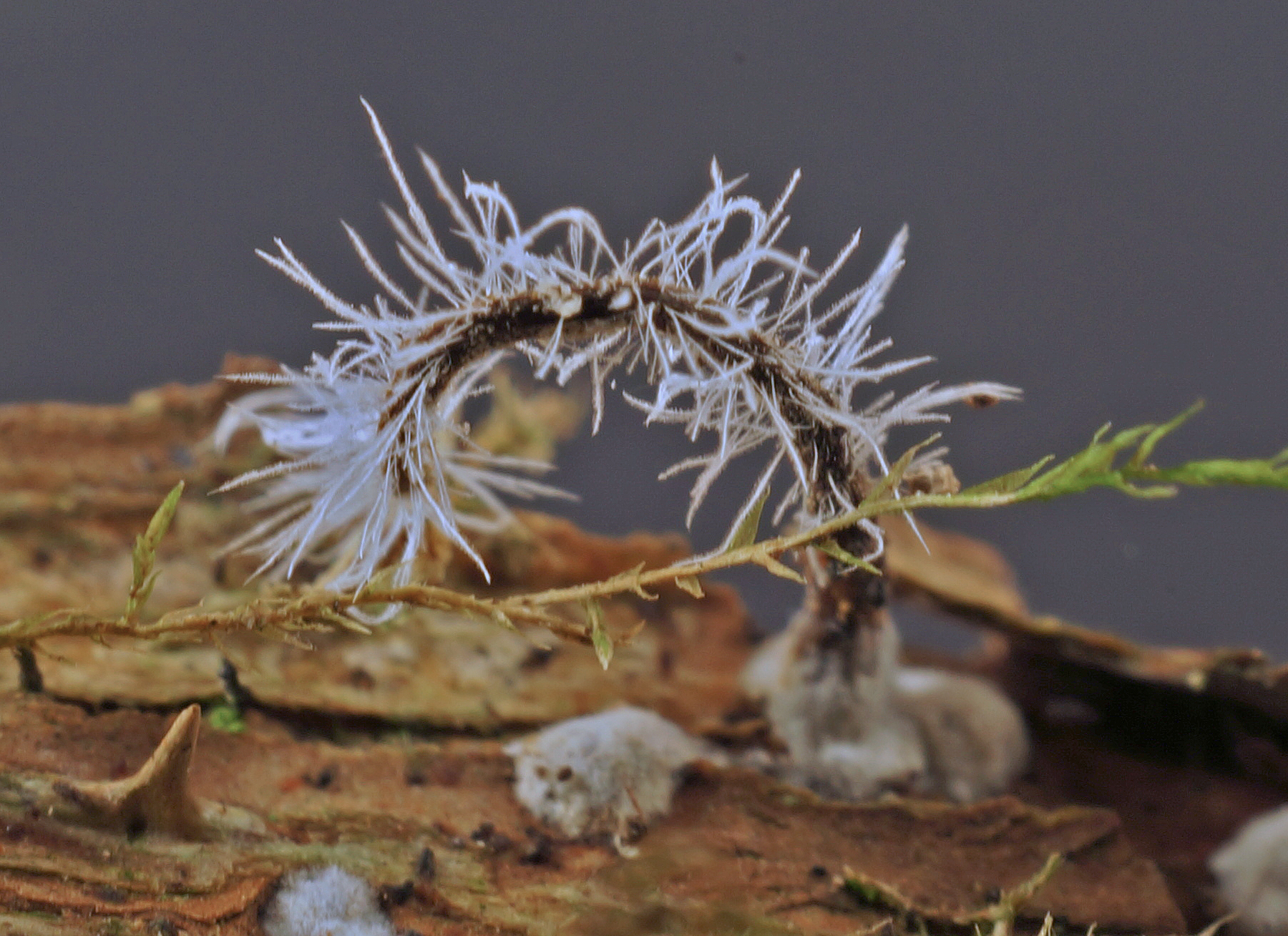
- Tilachlidium brachiatum

Scientific classification
- Kingdom: Fungi
- Division: Ascomycota
- Class: Sordariomycetes
- Order: Hypocreales
- Family: Tilachlidiaceae
- Genus: Tilachlidium; Preuss

Type species
- Tilachlidium pinnatum Preuss

= Tilachlidium =

Genus of fungi

Tilachlidium is a genus of fungi in the family Tilachlidiaceae.

The genus was circumscribed by Carl Gottlieb Traugott Preuss in 1851.

== Species ==
According to Catalogue of Life (as of May 2023), the genus has 15 accepted species:

- Tilachlidium atratum Lindf.
- Tilachlidium brachiatum (Batsch) Petch
- Tilachlidium cinnabarinum Kidd & Beaumont
- Tilachlidium malorum Marchal & É.J. Marchal
- Tilachlidium medietatis Novobr.
- Tilachlidium microsporum Kamyschko
- Tilachlidium nigrescens Marchal & É.J. Marchal
- Tilachlidium pinnatum Preuss
- Tilachlidium poneraticum Z.Q. Liang, J.D. Liang, Wan H. Chen & Y.F. Han
- Tilachlidium proliferum Oudem.
- Tilachlidium racemosum Oudem.
- Tilachlidium ramosum (Mains) Mains
- Tilachlidium roseum Svilv.
- Tilachlidium setigerum Malençon
- Tilachlidium subulatum A.L. Sm.
