= Teleomorph, anamorph and holomorph =

Terminology used with fungi

In mycology, the terms teleomorph, anamorph, and holomorph apply to portions of the life cycles of fungi in the phyla Ascomycota and Basidiomycota:

- Teleomorph: the sexual reproductive stage (morph), typically a fruiting body.
- Anamorph: an asexual reproductive stage (morph), often mold-like. When a single fungus produces multiple morphologically distinct anamorphs, these are called synanamorphs.
- Holomorph: the whole fungus, including anamorphs and teleomorph.

The terms were introduced in 1981 to simplify the discussion of the procedures of the existing dual-naming system, which (1) permitted anamorphs to have their separate names but (2) treated teleomorphic names as having precedence for being used as the holomorphic name. The Melbourne Code removes the provisions and allows all names to compete on equal footing for priority as the correct name of a fungus, and hence does not use the term holomorph any more.

== Dual naming of fungi ==
Fungi are classified primarily based on the structures associated with sexual reproduction, which tend to be evolutionarily conserved. However, many fungi reproduce only asexually, and cannot easily be classified based on sexual characteristics; some produce both asexual and sexual states. These species are often members of the Ascomycota, but a few of them belong to the Basidiomycota. Even among fungi that reproduce both sexually and asexually, often only one method of reproduction can be observed at a specific point in time or under specific conditions. Additionally, fungi typically grow in mixed colonies and sporulate amongst each other. These facts have made it very difficult to link the various states of the same fungus.

Fungi that are not known to produce a teleomorph were historically placed into an artificial phylum, the "Deuteromycota," also known as "fungi imperfecti," simply for convenience. Some workers hold that this is an obsolete concept, and that molecular phylogeny allows accurate placement of species which are known from only part of their life cycle. Others retain the term "deuteromycetes," but give it a lowercase "d" and no taxonomic rank.

Historically, Article 59 of the International Code of Botanical Nomenclature permitted mycologists to give asexually reproducing fungi (anamorphs) separate names from their sexual states (teleomorphs). This practice was discontinued as of 1 January 2013.

The dual naming system can be confusing. However, it is essential for workers in plant pathology, mold identification, medical mycology, and food microbiology, fields in which asexually reproducing fungi are commonly encountered.

== From dual system to single nomenclature ==
The separate names for anamorphs of fungi with a pleomorphic life-cycle has been an issue of debate since the phenomenon was recognized in the mid-19th century. This was even before the first international rules for botanical nomenclature were issued in 1867. Special provisions are to be found in the earliest Codes, which were then modified several times, and often substantially. The rules have been updated regularly and become increasingly complex, and by the mid-1970s they were being interpreted in different ways by different mycologists – even ones working on the same genus. Following intensive discussions under the auspices of the International Mycological Association, drastic changes were made at the International Botanical Congress in 1981 to clarify and simplify the procedures – and the new terms anamorph, teleomorph, and holomorph entered general use. An unfortunate effect of the simplification was that many name changes had to be made, including for some well-known and economically important species; at that date, the conservation of species names was not allowed under the Code.

Unforeseen in the 1970s, when the 1981 provisions were crafted, was the impact of molecular systematics. A decade later, it was starting to become obvious that fungi with no known sexual stage could confidently be placed in genera which were typified by species in which the sexual stage was known. This possibility of abandoning the dual nomenclatural system was debated at subsequent International Mycological Congresses and on other occasions, and the need for change was increasingly recognized. At the International Botanical Congress in Vienna in 2005, some minor modifications were made which allowed anamorph-typified names to be epitypified by material showing the sexual stage when it was discovered, and for that anamorph name to continue to be used.

The 1995 edition of the influential Ainsworth and Bisby’s Dictionary of the Fungi sought to replace the term anamorph with mitosporic fungus and teleomorph with meiosporic fungus, based on the idea that the fundamental distinction is whether mitosis or meiosis preceded sporulation. This is a controversial choice because it is not clear that the morphological differences which traditionally define anamorphs and teleomorphs line up completely with sexual practices, or whether those sexual practices are sufficiently well understood in some cases.

The Vienna Congress (2005) established a Special Committee to investigate the issue further, but it was unable to reach a consensus. Matters were becoming increasingly desperate as mycologists using molecular phylogenetic approaches started to ignore the provisions, or interpret them in different ways.

== One fungus, one name ==
The International Botanical Congress in Melbourne in July 2011 made a change in the International Code of Nomenclature for algae, fungi, and plants and adopted the principle "one fungus, one name". After 1 January 2013, one fungus can only have one name; the system of permitting separate names to be used for anamorphs then ended. This means that all legitimate names proposed for a species, regardless of what stage they are typified by, can serve as the correct name for that species.

Since the Brussels Congress in 1910, there has been provision for a separate name (or names) for the asexual (anamorph) state (or states) of fungi with a pleomorphic life cycle from that applicable to the sexual (teleomorph) state and to the whole fungus. The Brussels Rules (Briquet, Règles Int. Nomencl. Bot., ed. 2. 1912) specified that names given to states other than the sexual one (the “perfect state”) “have only a temporary value”, apparently anticipating a time when they would no longer be needed. At the Melbourne Congress, it was decided that this time had come – but not through disuse as may have been envisaged in Brussels. Throughout the various changes since 1912 to the rules on names of fungi with a pleomorphic life cycle, one element has remained constant: the correct name for the taxon in all its morphs (the holomorph) was the earliest applicable to the sexual state (the teleomorph). In Melbourne, this restriction was overturned and it was decided that all legitimate fungal names were to be treated equally for the purposes of establishing priority, regardless of the life history stage of the type. As a consequence the Melbourne Congress also approved additional special provisions for the conservation and rejection of fungal names to mitigate the nomenclatural disruption that would otherwise arise.

All names now compete on an equal footing for priority. In order not to render illegitimate the names that had been introduced in the past for separate morphs, it was agreed that these should not be treated as superfluous alternative names in the sense of the Code. It was further decided that no anamorph-typified name should be taken up to displace a widely used teleomorph-typified name without the case's having been considered by the General Committee established by the Congress. Recognizing that there were cases in some groups of fungi where there could be many names that might merit formal retention or rejection, a new provision was introduced: Lists of names can be submitted to the General Committee and, after due scrutiny, names accepted on those lists are to be treated as conserved over competing synonyms (and listed as Appendices to the Code). Lichen-forming fungi (but not lichenicolous fungi) had always been excluded from the provisions permitting dual nomenclature.

The provisions are adopted in the Melbourne Code of 2012 as a modification to the existing Article 59. In the Shenzhen Code of 2018, a new chapter F "Names of organisms treated as fungi" was added, collecting all fungus-specific provisions including the original Article 59 into this chapter. As of April 2025, the latest revision of this part is the San Juan Chapter F of 2019, published as an addendum of the Shenzhen Code of 2018.

The problem of choosing one name among many remains to be examined for many large, agriculturally or medically-important genera like Aspergillus and Fusarium. Articles have been published on such specific genera to propose ways to define them under the newer rules.

== See also ==
- Fungi imperfecti
- List of mitosporic Ascomycota
