= Corynesporascaceae =

Scientific classification
- Kingdom: Fungi
- Division: Ascomycota
- Class: Dothideomycetes
- Order: Pleosporales
- Family: Corynesporascaceae; Sivan.

Family of fungi

The Corynesporascaceae are a family of fungi with an uncertain taxonomic placement in the class Dothideomycetes.
