= Carlo Luigi Spegazzini =

Argentine mycologist (1858–1926)

Carlos Luis Spegazzini
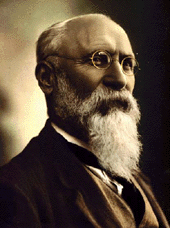
- Spegazzini on his 65th birthday
- Born: April 20, 1858; Bairo, Italy
- Died: July 1, 1926 (aged 68); La Plata, Argentina
- Known for: Studies in mycology and vascular plants
- Scientific career
- Doctoral advisor: Pier Andrea Saccardo
- Author abbrev. (botany): Speg.

Carlo Luigi Spegazzini, in Spanish Carlos Luis Spegazzini (20 April 1858 – 1 July 1926), was an Italian-born Argentinian botanist and mycologist.

On the 1881/1882 expedition led by Giacomo Bove to explore Patagonia and Tierra del Fuego, the Italian Decio Vinciguerra was officially both zoologist and botanist, but in fact Spegazzini handled the botanical work. Spegazzini published about 100 scientific papers on vascular plants, describing around 1000 new taxa. He was a professor at the University of La Plata and Buenos Aires in Argentina, curator of the herbarium of the National Department of Agriculture, first head of the herbarium of Museo de la Plata, and founder of an arboretum and an institute of mycology in La Plata city. He issued two exsiccatae, the first series in 1879 with the title Decades mycologicae Italicae distributing fungi from Italy, the second in 1881 with the title Hongos Sud-Americanos: decades mycologiae Argentinae distributing fungal specimens from Argentina.

In 1924 he edited the journal Revista Argentina de Botánica, but only four issues were published before his death.

In a 1924 Mycologia publication, William Murrill recounted his time visiting with Spegazzini, who was then 66 years old:

Dr Spegazzini is an old man, but strong in body, young in thought, and still full of the spirit of adventure. He has just returned from Tierra del Fuego, is planning to go to Europe next year, and promises me to come to the United States the following year 'if nothing happens'. He was born in a village in Italy and was a student of the fungi there before coming to Argentina. He has described a great many South American plants in various groups but his work is poorly known elsewhere and few of his specimens have been seen by other botanists. ... The Doctor is exceedingly genial in manner and very kind hearted. He and his son stayed with me all day long, showing me specimens, photographs and publications; giving me anything I wanted for our herbarium; taking me out to a sportsman's club for lunch; visiting the museum; and going on a short collecting trip in the woods. We talked French, German, English, Latin and Spanish indiscriminately and recklessly, keeping up a continuous flow of conversation lest our ignorance in certain languages be discovered.

The standard author abbreviation Speg. is used to indicate this person as the author when citing a botanical name. The International Plant Names Index has more than 2,700 records for plant names of which he is either the author, a co-author or involved in the basionym. Spegazzini was one of the most prolific authors of new fungal species, having formally described about 4900 in his career.

== Eponyms of Carlo Luigi Spegazzini ==
He is also honoured in the naming of several taxa.

=== Eponymous genera ===
- Spegazzinia a genus of fungi in the Apiosporaceae family by Pier Andrea Saccardo in 1880.
- Spegazzinites, a genus of fungi, by J.Félix in 1894,
- Spegazzinia by Backeb. in 1933, a genus of cactus which is a synonym of Rebutia,
- Neospegazzinia by Petr. & Syd. in 1936 (genus of Fungi),
- Carlosia by G.Sampaio in 1923, now a synonym of Thelomma A.Massal., 1860,
- Spegazziniella by Bat. & I.H.Lima in 1959 (genus of fungi), Schizothyriaceae family,
- Spegazziniophytum by Esser in 2001 (genus of plant in Euphorbiaceae family).

== Other sources ==
- Katinas, Liliana; Diego G. Gutierrez; Silvia S. Torres Robles (2000). "Carlos Spegazzini (1858-1926): Travels and Botanical Work on Vascular Plants". Annals of the Missouri Botanical Garden. 87 (2): 183–202. doi:10.2307/2666160. JSTOR 2666160.
- Giacchino, Adrián (2001). "Algunas Breves Biografías". Boletín Informativo de la Fundación de Historia Natural Félix de Azara. 2: 5–23.
- "Carlos Luis Spegazzini, Botánico (micólogo)". Proyecto Ameghino: Los orígenes de la ciencia argentina en Internet. Instituto de Estudios Sociales de la Ciencia y la Tecnología, Universidad Nacional de Quilmes. 2011.
