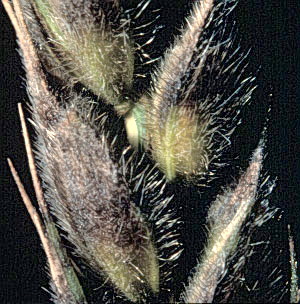
- Necrosis on wheat from Phaeosphaeria nodorum (syn. Stagonospora nodorum)

Scientific classification
- Kingdom: Fungi
- Division: Ascomycota
- Class: Dothideomycetes
- Order: Pleosporales
- Family: Phaeosphaeriaceae
- Genus: Stagonospora

Species
- Stagonospora avenae Stagonospora meliloti Stagonospora recedens Stagonospora sacchari Stagonospora tainanensis... see text

= Stagonospora =

Genus of fungi

Stagonospora is a genus of fungi clustering in the Phaeosphaeriaceae (Quaedvlieg). Several of the species in this genus are plant pathogens.

== Taxonomy ==
- Phaeosphaeriaceae
  - Cicinnobolus
  - Stagonospora
    - Stagonospora atriplicis
    - Stagonospora euonymi
    - Stagonospora caricis
    - Stagonospora arrhenatheri
    - Stagonospora junciseda
    - Stagonospora dulcamarae
    - Stagonospora elegans
    - Stagonospora gigaspora
    - Stagonospora socia
    - Stagonospora sparganii
    - Stagonospora paludosa
    - Stagonospora hyalospora
    - Stagonospora trimera
    - Stagonospora tussilaginis
    - Stagonospora vexatula
    - Stagonospora fragariae
    - Stagonospora simplicior
    - Stagonospora typhoidearum
    - Stagonospora graminella
    - Stagonospora vitensis
  - Hendersonia
  - Eudarluca
  - Sclerostagonospora
  - Ampelomyces
  - Wilmia
  - Phaeosphaeria
  - Carinispora
  - Phaeoseptoria
  - Parabotryon
  - Ophiosphaerella
  - Sphaerellopsis
  - Tiarospora
  - Scolecosporiella
  - Monascostroma
  - Lautitia
  - Mixtura
  - Hadrospora
  - Nodulosphaeria

Previously included species include S. curtisii= Peyronellaea curtisii (leaf scorch).

== Bibliography ==
- Holliday, Paul (1980). "Staganosporus". Fungus diseases of tropical crops. Cambridge: Cambridge University Press. p. 497. ISBN 0521225299.
- Moore, WC (1959). "Staganosporus". British Parasitic Fungi. Cambridge: Cambridge University Press. p. 372.
- Zhang Y, Schoch CL, Fournier J, Crous PW, Gruyter J De, Woudenberg JHC, Hirayama K, Tanaka K, Pointing SB, Hyde KD. 2009. Multi-locus phylogeny of the Pleosporales: a taxonomic, ecological and evolutionary re-evaluation. Studies in Mycology 64: 85–102.
- Quaedvlieg, W.; Verkley, G.J.M.; Shin, H.-D.; Barreto, R.W.; Alfenas, A.C.; Swart, W.J.; Groenewald, J.Z.; Crous, P.W. (June 2013). "Sizing up Septoria". Studies in Mycology. 75 (1): 307–390. doi:10.3114/sim0017. PMC 3713890. PMID 24014902.
