= List of Coniothyrium species =

This is a list of the fungus species in the genus Coniothyrium. Many are plant pathogens. As of 28 July 2023, the GBIF lists up to 499 species, while Species Fungorum lists about 450 species.

== A ==
- Coniothyrium abutilonis Khokhr. (1933)
- Coniothyrium acaciae Trotter (1916)
- Coniothyrium acantholimonis Kalymb. (1962)
- Coniothyrium aceris Bondartsev (1921)
- Coniothyrium aconiti M. Petrov (1933)
- Coniothyrium acutiloba (Dearn. & House) Arx (1957)
- Coniothyrium adenocarpi (Gonz. Frag.) Petr. & Syd. (1927)
- Coniothyrium aegaeum Petr. (1942)
- Coniothyrium ahmadii B. Sutton (1974)
- Coniothyrium ailanthi-glandulosae (Sacc.) Biga, Cif. & Bestagno (1959)
- Coniothyrium albae Pandotra & A. Husain (1966)
- Coniothyrium aleuritis Teng (1936)
- Coniothyrium alni Siemaszko (1923)
- Coniothyrium amaranthi (Tassi) Sacc. & D. Sacc. (1906)
- Coniothyrium ammodendri Golovin (1950)
- Coniothyrium ammophilae Oudem. ex Petr. & Syd. (1924)
- Coniothyrium ampelopsidis-hederaceae (Sacc.) Biga, Cif. & Bestagno (1959)
- Coniothyrium ampelos (Schwein.) Tassi (1902)
- Coniothyrium amphistelmae Henn. (1908)
- Coniothyrium amphistomoides Ade (1926)
- Coniothyrium amurense Petr. (1934)
- Coniothyrium amygdali Gonz. Frag. ex Trotter (1931)
- Coniothyrium anacycli Gonz. Frag. (1925)
- Coniothyrium andropogonis Gonz. Frag. (1917)
- Coniothyrium anomalum I. Miyake (1910)
- Coniothyrium arctostaphyli (Vize) Tassi (1902)
- Coniothyrium arecae Padwick & Merh (1943)
- Coniothyrium arenarium E. Bommer, M. Rousseau & Sacc. (1906)
- Coniothyrium armeniacae Hollós (1906)
- Coniothyrium armeriae Petr. & Syd. (1927)
- Coniothyrium artemisiae (Gonz. Frag.) Petr. & Syd. (1927)
- Coniothyrium asperulum Petr. (1947)
- Coniothyrium asphodeli Gonz. Frag. (1924)
- Coniothyrium asterinum (Cooke & Harkn.) Tassi (1902)
- Coniothyrium astragali Golovin (1950)
- Coniothyrium astragalinum Kirschst. (1939)
- Coniothyrium atraphaxis Esfand. (1950)
- Coniothyrium atriplicis Maubl. (1903)
- Coniothyrium atropae Naumov (1951)
- Coniothyrium aucubae Sacc. (1875)
- Coniothyrium australe Sacc. (1878)

== B ==
- Coniothyrium baccharidicola Speg. (1910)
- Coniothyrium baccharidis-magellanicae Cotton (1915)
- Coniothyrium baeticum Picb. (1931)
- Coniothyrium bambusae I. Miyake & Hara (1910)
- Coniothyrium baptisiae (Thüm.) Tassi (1902)
- Coniothyrium bartholomaei Dearn. & Barthol. (1924)
- Coniothyrium bataticola Khokhr. & Dyur. (1934)
- Coniothyrium batumense Siemaszko (1923)
- Coniothyrium berberidicola Petr. (1927)
- Coniothyrium berberidiphilum Speg. (1924)
- Coniothyrium berberidis-vulgaris (Sacc.) Biga, Cif. & Bestagno (1959)
- Coniothyrium boehmeriae Khokhr. (1933)
- Coniothyrium bohdanii Truszk. (1961)
- Coniothyrium boldoae Speg. (1910)
- Coniothyrium bougainvilleae A.C. Santos & Sousa da Câmara (1954)
- Coniothyrium boydeanum A.L. Sm. (1900)
- Coniothyrium boyeri Tassi (1902)
- Coniothyrium brevisporum I. Miyake (1910)
- Coniothyrium bryoniae Kalymb. (1962)
- Coniothyrium buddlejae (Cooke) Grove (1937)
- Coniothyrium bulbicola Hollós (1907)
- Coniothyrium bulgaricum Bubák & Picb. (1937)
- Coniothyrium bupleuri (Henn.) Died. (1913)
- Coniothyrium bupleuri-fruticosi Petr. & Syd. (1927)
- Coniothyrium burchardiae McAlpine (1904)

== C ==
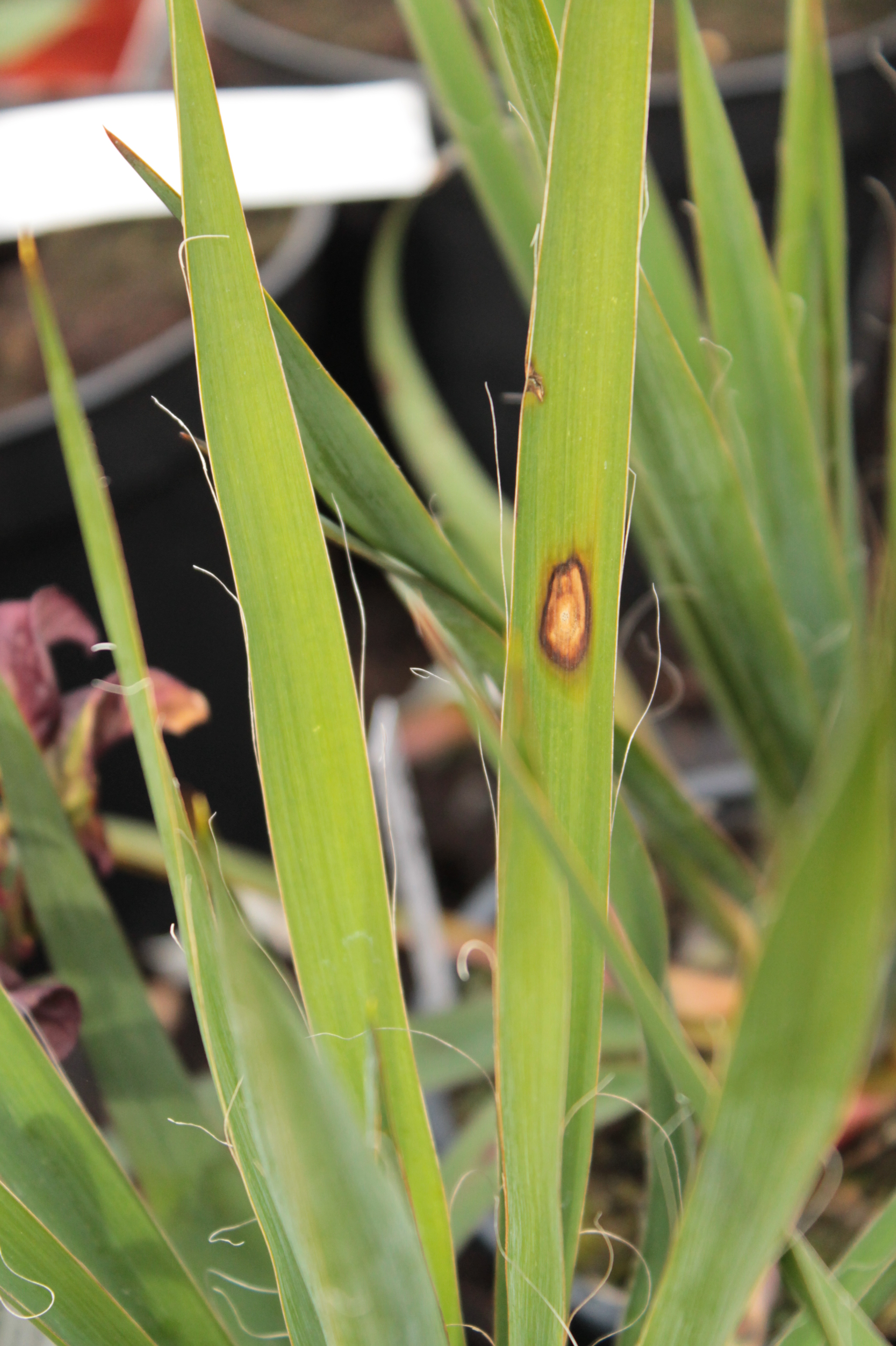
Coniothyrium concentricum on Yucca filamentosa

- Coniothyrium cacti Shreem. (1977)
- Coniothyrium caesalpiniae Gucevič (1960)
- Coniothyrium caespitulosum Sacc. (1878)
- Coniothyrium calligoni Golovin (1968)
- Coniothyrium calotropidis S. Ahmad (1964)
- Coniothyrium calycanthi-floridi (Sacc.) Biga, Cif. & Bestagno (1959)
- Coniothyrium campanulae Hollós (1910)
- Coniothyrium camphorosmae Lobik (1928)
- Coniothyrium canarii C.F. Zhang & P.K. Chi (2000)
- Coniothyrium cannabinum Curzi (1927)
- Coniothyrium capparicola S. Ahmad (1967)
- Coniothyrium capparis S. Ahmad (1971)
- Coniothyrium careyae M.S. Patil & Thite (1977)
- Coniothyrium carpaticum Petr. (1927)
- Coniothyrium carpini-betuli (Sacc.) Biga, Cif. & Bestagno (1959)
- Coniothyrium caryogenum F.V. Rand (1914)
- Coniothyrium cassiicola Cooke (1885)
- Coniothyrium catalpae-syringifoliae (Sacc.) Biga, Cif. & Bestagno (1959)
- Coniothyrium cattanei Tassi (1902)
- Coniothyrium ceibae Petr. & Cif. (1932)
- Coniothyrium celmisiae Syd. (1924)
- Coniothyrium celtidicola Miura (1928)
- Coniothyrium celtidis-australis (Sacc.) Biga, Cif. & Bestagno (1959)
- Coniothyrium chanousianum (Sacc.) Petr. & Syd. (1927)
- Coniothyrium cheiranthi Zerova (1939)
- Coniothyrium chengii Gucevič (1960)
- Coniothyrium chiangmaiense Goonas., Thambug. & K.D. Hyde (2017)
- Coniothyrium chiliotrichi Cotton (1915)
- Coniothyrium chimonanthi Kuhnh.-Lord. & J.P. Barry (1949)
- Coniothyrium chionanthi Fairm. (1913)
- Coniothyrium chochrjakovii Hüseyın (1989)
- Coniothyrium clerodendri S. Ahmad (1964)
- Coniothyrium cocculi Gonz. Frag. ex Trotter (1931)
- Coniothyrium coffeae Zimm. (1902)
- Coniothyrium comari Henn. (1903)
- Coniothyrium concentricum (Desm.) Sacc. (1878)
- Coniothyrium conicola Vestergr. (1902)
- Coniothyrium connari Henn. (1908)
- Coniothyrium conoideum Sacc. (1878)
- Coniothyrium conorum Sacc. & Roum. (1882)
- Coniothyrium convolutum A.S. Horne (1920)
- Coniothyrium cookei Tassi (1902)
- Coniothyrium coptospermae Henn. (1908)
- Coniothyrium corticalis (Kalchbr. & Cooke) Tassi (1902)
- Coniothyrium crepinianum Sacc. & Roum. (1884)
- Coniothyrium cucurbitacearum (Tassi) Sacc. & D. Sacc. (1906)
- Coniothyrium cupressacearum (M. Morelet) M. Morelet (1971)
- Coniothyrium cydoniae Brunaud (1892)
- Coniothyrium cytisi Henn. (1904)

== D ==
- Coniothyrium dactyloides Matsush. (1996)
- Coniothyrium dehiscens Sacc. & P. Syd. (1902)
- Coniothyrium desertorum Melnik (1968)
- Coniothyrium deviatum Syd. (1935)
- Coniothyrium dianthi Staritz (1918)
- Coniothyrium dianthicola Alcalde (1945)
- Coniothyrium dicrani H. Maia & Bat. (1960)
- Coniothyrium diedickeanum Reichert (1921)
- Coniothyrium dioscoreae V.P. Sahni (1968)
- Coniothyrium dipsacinum (Bubák) Keissl. (1923)
- Coniothyrium discincola (Ellis & Everh.) Keissl. (1922)
- Coniothyrium dispersellum P. Karst. (1884)
- Coniothyrium dobiaschii Moesz (1938)
- Coniothyrium dolichi (Mohanty) Verkley & Gruyter (2012)
- Coniothyrium doliolum Dorogin (1922)
- Coniothyrium domesticum Henn. (1903)
- Coniothyrium dorycnii Urries (1942)
- Coniothyrium dracaenae F. Stevens & Weedon (1925)
- Coniothyrium dumeei Briosi & Cavara (1905)

== E ==
- Coniothyrium ebeni Gonz. Frag. (1916)
- Coniothyrium elaeagni N.P. Golovina (1960)
- Coniothyrium ephedrae Golovin (1950)
- Coniothyrium ephedricola Kravtzev (1961)
- Coniothyrium epilobii Ferraris (1902)
- Coniothyrium episphaerium Höhn. (1904)
- Coniothyrium equiseti Lambotte & Fautrey (1896)
- Coniothyrium equiseti-maximi Manoliu & Mítítíuc (1976)
- Coniothyrium eriogoni Earle (1901)
- Coniothyrium eucalypticola B. Sutton (1971)
- Coniothyrium eugeniae Tassi (1900)
- Coniothyrium euonymi Bres. & Schmor. (1934)
- Coniothyrium euonymi-japonicae (Sacc.) Biga, Cif. & Bestagno (1959)
- Coniothyrium evolvuli (Pat.) Tassi (1902)

== F ==
- Coniothyrium fagi Tehon (1933)
- Coniothyrium fatsiae Dzhalag. (1965)
- Coniothyrium faullii Darker (1964)
- Coniothyrium ferrarisianum Biga, Cif. & Bestagno (1959)
- Coniothyrium fluviatile Kabát & Bubák (1904)
- Coniothyrium foliicola Jaap (1916)
- Coniothyrium foliorum Bondartsev (1921)
- Coniothyrium fragosoi Caball. (1918)
- Coniothyrium fraxini (Died.) Petr. & Syd. (1927)
- Coniothyrium fructicola Hollós (1907)
- Coniothyrium fuckelii Sacc. (1876)
- Coniothyrium fuliginosum (P. Karst.) Sacc. ex Petr. & Syd. (1924)

== G ==
- Coniothyrium galii Trotter (1916)
- Coniothyrium gallicola Henn. (1904)
- Coniothyrium garryae Nann. (1932)
- Coniothyrium gattefossei Duvernoy & Maire (1921)
- Coniothyrium gelatosporum Petr. (1954)
- Coniothyrium genistae (Roum.) Berl. & Voglino (1886)
- Coniothyrium genisticola Oudem. (1902)
- Coniothyrium ginkgoina Schwarzman (1968)
- Coniothyrium glabroides F. Stevens (1918)
- Coniothyrium globisporum Bubák & Serebrian. (1916)
- Coniothyrium glomerulatum Sacc. (1879)
- Coniothyrium glycines (R.B. Stewart) Verkley & Gruyter (2012)
- Coniothyrium gmelinae Henn. (1908)
- Coniothyrium golovinii Byzova (1968)
- Coniothyrium gregorii Příhoda (1954)
- Coniothyrium grewiae S. Ahmad (1964)
- Coniothyrium grossulariae Henn. (1904)

== H ==
- Coniothyrium halimi (Castagne) Sacc. (1881)
- Coniothyrium halimodendri Murashk. (1924)
- Coniothyrium halosciadis Petr. (1936)
- Coniothyrium hariotianum Speg. (1908)
- Coniothyrium helianthi Ellis & Barthol. (1902)
- Coniothyrium helichrysi Unamuno (1942)
- Coniothyrium heliotropii Golovin (1950)
- Coniothyrium henningsianum Trotter (1931)
- Coniothyrium henningsii Gonz. Frag. (1917)
- Coniothyrium henriquesii Thüm. (1879)
- Coniothyrium herbarum Schulzer & Sacc. (1884)
- Coniothyrium herraniae Henn. (1908)
- Coniothyrium heveae Saccas (1953)
- Coniothyrium hualaniae (Speg.) Petr. & Syd. (1927)
- Coniothyrium hulthemiae Kravtzev (1961)
- Coniothyrium humuli Hollós (1907)
- Coniothyrium hyperici Henn. (1905)
- Coniothyrium hypericicola Gucevič (1960)
- Coniothyrium hyperparasiticum Subhedar & V.G. Rao (1979)

== I ==
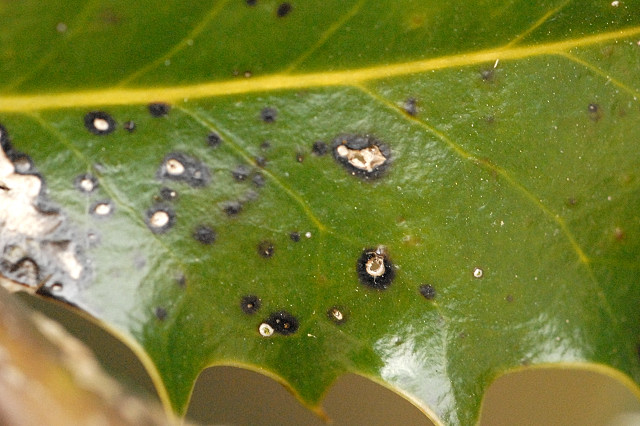
Coniothyrium ilicis on holly leaf

- Coniothyrium ilicinum Ellis & H.W. Anderson (1891)
- Coniothyrium ilicis A.L. Sm. & Ramsb. (1917)
- Coniothyrium inevorum Hara (1959)
- Coniothyrium insigne Syd. (1924)
- Coniothyrium insitivum Sacc. (1878)
- Coniothyrium insuetum Syd. (1925)
- Coniothyrium inulae Jaap (1916)
- Coniothyrium iranicum Esfand. (1947)
- Coniothyrium ismailii Abbas, B. Sutton & Ghaffar (1999)

== J ==
- Coniothyrium jaenense Petr. (1931)
- Coniothyrium japonicum I. Miyake (1910)
- Coniothyrium jasmini (Thüm.) Sacc. (1884)
- Coniothyrium junci Ellis & Everh. (1902)
- Coniothyrium juniperi Schwarzman (1968)

== K ==
- Coniothyrium kallangurense B. Sutton & Alcorn (1975)
- Coniothyrium kansense Ellis & Barthol. (1927)
- Coniothyrium karelii Petr. (1953)
- Coniothyrium kochiae Săvul. & Sandu (1935)
- Coniothyrium koeleriae A.L. Guyot (1958)
- Coniothyrium koelreuteriae (Hollós) Biga, Cif. & Bestagno (1959)
- Coniothyrium korovinii Golovin (1950)
- Coniothyrium kraunhiae I. Miyake (1912)
- Coniothyrium kravtzevii Schwarzman (1968)
- Coniothyrium kurdicum Petr. (1959)

== L ==
- Coniothyrium laburnophilum Oudem. (1901)
- Coniothyrium lathyri Potebnia (1907)
- Coniothyrium lauricola Speg. (1921)
- Coniothyrium lauri-nobilis (Brunaud) Biga, Cif. & Bestagno (1959)
- Coniothyrium lavandulae Maire (1937)
- Coniothyrium leguminicola Jaap (1916)
- Coniothyrium leguminum (Rabenh.) Sacc. (1892)
- Coniothyrium leptadeniae S. Ahmad (1967)
- Coniothyrium lespedezae (Henn.) Died. (1913)
- Coniothyrium lesquerella Lind (1910)
- Coniothyrium leucothoes Henn. (1904)
- Coniothyrium levistici Sandu & Mítítíuc (1967)
- Coniothyrium lignorum (Fr.) Sacc. (1884)
- Coniothyrium litchi P.K. Chi & Z.D. Jiang (1994)
- Coniothyrium litchii P.K. Chi & Z.D. Jiang (2000)
- Coniothyrium lobeliae (Berk. & Broome) Petch (1924)

== M ==
- Coniothyrium macrosporum S. Ahmad (1964)
- Coniothyrium maculans (Kuntze) Tassi (1902)
- Coniothyrium maderense Petr. (1931)
- Coniothyrium magnoliae (Westend.) Sacc. & Traverso (1910)
- Coniothyrium manihotis Nann. (1932)
- Coniothyrium maqsoodii Abbas, B. Sutton & Ghaffar (1999)
- Coniothyrium marisci Tehon (1919)
- Coniothyrium marrubii Fairm. (1923)
- Coniothyrium massariae Petr. (1940)
- Coniothyrium mate Speg. (1908)
- Coniothyrium maticola Speg. (1908)
- Coniothyrium mattiroloanum Ferraris (1902)
- Coniothyrium maydis Saccas (1951)
- Coniothyrium mediciginis Kalymb. (1955)
- Coniothyrium melanconieum Sacc. (1909)
- Coniothyrium mesopotamicum Bubák (1914)
- Coniothyrium metasequoiae Gucevič (1960)
- Coniothyrium microperoides (Schulzer) Sacc. & Traverso (1910)
- Coniothyrium microscopicum Sacc. (1884)
- Coniothyrium microsporum Tassi (1900)
- Coniothyrium mikaniae Bat. & Peres (1965)
- Coniothyrium minus (Ellis & Barthol.) Petr. & Syd. (1927)
- Coniothyrium minutum (Died.) Petr. & Syd. (1927)
- Coniothyrium morianum Traverso (1903)
- Coniothyrium moricola S. Ahmad (1971)
- Coniothyrium mororum Briosi & Farneti (1901)
- Coniothyrium muciferum (Berk.) Grove (1937)
- Coniothyrium muscorum Racov. (1959)

== N ==
- Coniothyrium negundinis Tehon & E.Y. Daniels (1925)
- Coniothyrium nematostomatis Petr. (1955)
- Coniothyrium nerterae Jørst. (1947)
- Coniothyrium nevadense A.L. Guyot (1958)
- Coniothyrium nitrariae Bubák (1914)

== O ==
- Coniothyrium obiones Jaap (1907)
- Coniothyrium obionis-verruciferae Săvul. & Sandu (1933)
- Coniothyrium occultum Syd. (1937)
- Coniothyrium ochradeni Petr. & Scharif (1957)
- Coniothyrium ocoteifolii Bat. & Peres (1964)
- Coniothyrium oleae Pollacci (1911)
- Coniothyrium olympicum Allesch. (1897)
- Coniothyrium oosporum (Corda) S. Hughes (1958)
- Coniothyrium opuntiae Voglino (1913)
- Coniothyrium orbicula (Ellis & Everh.) Keissl. (1922)
- Coniothyrium orni Henn. (1903)
- Coniothyrium oroxyli Henn. (1908)
- Coniothyrium oryzivorum Hara (1939)
- Coniothyrium ovalis (Cooke & Harkn.) Tassi (1902)

== P ==
- Coniothyrium paeoniae Montemart. (1915)
- Coniothyrium pakistanicum Abbas, B. Sutton & Ghaffar (1999)
- Coniothyrium palaquii Zimm. (1901)
- Coniothyrium paliuri Petr. & Syd. (1927)
- Coniothyrium pallidospermum H.C. Greene (1949)
- Coniothyrium palmarum Corda (1840)
- Coniothyrium palmicola (Fr.) Starbäck (1894)
- Coniothyrium palmigenum (Sacc.) Sacc. (1931)
- Coniothyrium pampaninianum Sacc. (1917)
- Coniothyrium panacis Gonz. Frag. & Cif. (1928)
- Coniothyrium pandanicola Petr. (1953)
- Coniothyrium panici Syd. (1930)
- Coniothyrium papillatum (Schulzer) Sacc. & Traverso (1910)
- Coniothyrium parasitans (Berk. & Ravenel) Tassi (1902)
- Coniothyrium parvum H.J. Swart (1986)
- Coniothyrium patouillardii Tassi (1902)
- Coniothyrium paulense Henn. (1908)
- Coniothyrium paulliniae Bat. & J.L. Bezerra (1961)
- Coniothyrium pax-augustanum Urries (1945)
- Coniothyrium pegani Schwarzman (1968)
- Coniothyrium pelargonii Petr. (1955)
- Coniothyrium penstemonis Earle (1901)
- Coniothyrium pentatropidis S. Ahmad (1964)
- Coniothyrium peplis A.L. Sm. & Ramsb. (1914)
- Coniothyrium perottianum Verona (1932)
- Coniothyrium persicae Sacc. & Cub. (1912)
- Coniothyrium peumi Speg. (1921)
- Coniothyrium philadelphi-coronarii (Sacc.) Biga, Cif. & Bestagno (1959)
- Coniothyrium phlomidis Jaap (1916)
- Coniothyrium phragmitis Purkay. & Mallik (1975)
- Coniothyrium phyllachorae Maubl. (1904)
- Coniothyrium phyllachoricola Bat. & J.L. Bezerra (1965)
- Coniothyrium phyllogenum (Sacc.) Sacc. (1912)
- Coniothyrium physocaulis Bubák & Picb. (1937)
- Coniothyrium phytolaccae Hollós (1909)
- Coniothyrium pittospori Politis (1940)
- Coniothyrium pityophilum (Höhn.) Petr. & Syd. (1927)
- Coniothyrium platani Sacc. (1878)
- Coniothyrium poivorum R. Sprague (1963)
- Coniothyrium polygoni Hollós (1907)
- Coniothyrium polyphagum Alcalde (1945)
- Coniothyrium polypodii Ferraris (1904)
- Coniothyrium populicola Miura (1928)
- Coniothyrium populina S. Ahmad (1971)
- Coniothyrium populi-nigrae (Sacc.) Biga, Cif. & Bestagno (1959)
- Coniothyrium populinum Schulzer & Sacc. (1884)
- Coniothyrium popuschoji Frolov (1968)
- Coniothyrium praeclarum Fairm. (1922)
- Coniothyrium protearum Joanne E. Taylor & Crous (1999)
- Coniothyrium proteus (Schulzer) Sacc. & Traverso (1910)
- Coniothyrium pruni McAlpine (1902)
- Coniothyrium psammae Oudem. (1898)
- Coniothyrium pteridis A.L. Sm. (1916)
- Coniothyrium pulsatillarum Petr. (1955)
- Coniothyrium punithalingamii Abbas, B. Sutton & Ghaffar (1999)
- Coniothyrium pycnanthae McAlpine (1904)
- Coniothyrium pyricola Potebnia (1907)

== Q ==
- Coniothyrium quercicola Oudem. (1902)
- Coniothyrium quercinum (Bonord.) Sacc. (1884)

== R ==
- Coniothyrium radicicola Tehon (1937)
- Coniothyrium radiciperdum Kravtzev (1955)
- Coniothyrium rafniicola (Henn.) Petr. (1927)
- Coniothyrium ramalinae Vouaux (1914)
- Coniothyrium rechingeri Petr. (1940)
- Coniothyrium retamae (Gonz. Frag.) Petr. & Syd. (1927)
- Coniothyrium rhamni T. Miyake (1913)
- Coniothyrium rhinanthi Died. (1927)
- Coniothyrium rhododendri Henn. (1903)
- Coniothyrium rhois Tharp (1917)
- Coniothyrium rhois-radicantis (Sacc.) Biga, Cif. & Bestagno (1959)
- Coniothyrium rosarum Cooke & Harkn. (1882)
- Coniothyrium rostrupii (Berl. & Voglino) Tassi (1902)
- Coniothyrium rude Bubák (1914)
- Coniothyrium rumicis Petr. (1921)
- Coniothyrium rupestris M.L. Farr (1968)
- Coniothyrium rupicola Petr. (1942)
- Coniothyrium rutae Henn. (1903)

== S ==
- Coniothyrium sabalidis Sousa da Câmara (1936)
- Coniothyrium saccharicola N.D. Sharma (1982)
- Coniothyrium salicicola Rota-Rossi (1908)
- Coniothyrium salvadorae Petr. & Scharif (1957)
- Coniothyrium sambuci Earle (1905)
- Coniothyrium sambucinum (Cooke) Tassi (1902)
- Coniothyrium sarothamni (Thüm.) Sacc. (1884)
- Coniothyrium sasae Syd. (1939)
- Coniothyrium saxifragae Rostr. (1906)
- Coniothyrium scabrum McAlpine (1901)
- Coniothyrium schoenocauli Syd. (1930)
- Coniothyrium scopariicola Petr. (1927)
- Coniothyrium securinegae Schwarzman & Byzova (1968)
- Coniothyrium sedi Hollós (1926)
- Coniothyrium semelinum Caball. (1941)
- Coniothyrium sennenii Gonz. Frag. (1920)
- Coniothyrium sepium Fairm. (1918)
- Coniothyrium septatum Joanne E. Taylor & Crous (2001)
- Coniothyrium sequoiae Gucevič (1957)
- Coniothyrium shoemakeri Negru & I. Popescu (1966)
- Coniothyrium sidae Quaedvl., Verkley, R.W. Barreto & Crous (2013)
- Coniothyrium silenes Bondartsev (1906)
- Coniothyrium sinuatum P. Karst. ex Petr. & Syd. (1924)
- Coniothyrium sivanesanii Abbas, B. Sutton & Ghaffar (1999)
- Coniothyrium slaptonense D. Hawksw. & Punith. (1975)
- Coniothyrium smirnowiae Golovin (1960)
- Coniothyrium sojae Bouriquet (1947)
- Coniothyrium solenophilum Maire (1945)
- Coniothyrium sooi Tóth (1962)
- Coniothyrium sorghi Saccas (1954)
- Coniothyrium spartii Gucevič (1970)
- Coniothyrium sphaerospermum Fuckel (1870)
- Coniothyrium sphaerosporum (Peck) Tassi (1902)
- Coniothyrium spiraeae T. Miyake (1914)
- Coniothyrium spiraeicola Gonz. Frag. ex Trotter (1931)
- Coniothyrium spokanense Sacc. (1920)
- Coniothyrium sporoboli Reichert (1921)
- Coniothyrium stanhopeae Henn. (1908)
- Coniothyrium stigmatoideum Sacc. (1913)
- Coniothyrium stipae Săvul. & Sandu (1940)
- Coniothyrium stipaenum Unamuno (1942)
- Coniothyrium stiparum Speg. (1902)
- Coniothyrium subcorticeum Kravtzev (1955)
- Coniothyrium subolivaceum Sacc. (1884)
- Coniothyrium sultanii Abbas, B. Sutton & Ghaffar (1999)
- Coniothyrium suttonii Abbas, B. Sutton & Ghaffar (1999)
- Coniothyrium sydowianum Petr. (1927)
- Coniothyrium syreniae-cuspidatae Sandu & Mítítíuc (1971)

== T ==
- Coniothyrium tamaricis Oudem. (1901)
- Coniothyrium tamarisci (Mont.) Petr. (1925)
- Coniothyrium tecomae-radicantis (Sacc.) Biga, Cif. & Bestagno (1959)
- Coniothyrium telephii (Allesch.) Verkley & Gruyter (2012)
- Coniothyrium tenue Died. (1914)
- Coniothyrium tephrosporum (Berk. & M.A. Curtis) Tassi (1902)
- Coniothyrium terminaliae S.D. Patil (1971)
- Coniothyrium theae Petch (1925)
- Coniothyrium thujae Shreem. (1968)
- Coniothyrium thymi Hollós (1926)
- Coniothyrium tirolense Bubák (1904)
- Coniothyrium trabutii Riza (1912)
- Coniothyrium trachomiti Nasȳrov (1972)
- Coniothyrium trifolii Naumov (1913)
- Coniothyrium triseptatum Dayar., Thyagaraja & K.D. Hyde (2020)
- Coniothyrium tritici (Cooke & Massee) Tassi (1902)
- Coniothyrium truncatum Abbas, B. Sutton & Ghaffar (1999)
- Coniothyrium tumefaciens Güssow (1908)
- Coniothyrium tungurahuense Petr. (1948)
- Coniothyrium turnerae Tassi (1900)
- Coniothyrium typhicola (Fautrey & Lambotte) Tassi (1902)

== U ==
- Coniothyrium ucrainicum (Petr.) Petr. (1927)
- Coniothyrium ulmeum P. Karst. (1884)
- Coniothyrium undulatum Abbas, B. Sutton & Ghaffar (1999)

== V ==
- Coniothyrium valdivianum Speg. (1910)
- Coniothyrium viburni Hollós (1906)
- Coniothyrium viburni Died. (1914)
- Coniothyrium vitivorum Miura (1928)
- Coniothyrium vochysiae Henn. (1905)

== W ==
- Coniothyrium warmingii Lind (1934)
- Coniothyrium wernsdorffiae Laubert (1905)
- Coniothyrium wisconsinense H.C. Greene (1968)
- Coniothyrium withaniae S. Ahmad (1951)

== X ==
- Coniothyrium xanthorroeae Henn. (1903)

== Y ==
- Coniothyrium yerbae Speg. (1908)
- Coniothyrium yuccae Speg. (1902)
- Coniothyrium yuccicola Chaiwan, Jayaward. & K.D. Hyde (2023)

== Z ==
- Coniothyrium zeae G.L. Stout (1930)
- Coniothyrium zingiberis F. Stevens & Atienza (1931)
- Coniothyrium ziziphinum S. Ahmad (1968)
