= Coniothyrium fuckelii =

Scientific classification
- Domain: Eukaryota
- Kingdom: Fungi
- Division: Ascomycota
- Class: Dothideomycetes
- Order: Pleosporales
- Family: Coniothyriaceae
- Genus: Coniothyrium
- Species: C. fuckelii

Binomial name
- Coniothyrium fuckelii (Speg.) M.P.S. Câmara, M.E. Palm & A.W. Ramaley, (2003) Sacc.,

Synonyms
- synonyms: Clisosporium fuckelii (Sacc.) Kuntze, Revis. gen. pl. (Leipzig) 3(3): 458 (1898); Coniothyrium fuckelii f. ampelospidis-hederaceae Sacc., Michelia 1(no. 2): 207 (1878); Coniothyrium fuckelii f. corrigiolae Gonz. Frag., Brotéria, sér. bot. 21(3): 121 (1924); Coniothyrium fuckelii f. pinastri Gonz. Frag., Quad. Bot. ambient. appl. 6: 23] (1925); Coniothyrium fuckelii f. rosarum Sacc., Michelia 1(no. 2): 207 (1878); Coniothyrium fuckelii f. robiniae-pseudoacaciae Sacc. [as robiniae-pseudacaciae], Michelia 1(no. 2): 207 (1878); Coniothyrium fuckelii f. thesii Unamuno, Boln Real Soc. Españ. Hist. Nat., Biologica 34: 145 (1934); Coniothyrium fuckelii f. ziziphi Sacc. [as 'zizyphi'], Annls mycol. 11(4): 317 (1913); Coniothyrium fuckelii var. cecidophilum C. Massal., in Saccardo, Annls mycol. 12(3): 283 (1914); Coniothyrium fuckelii var. disticha Sacc., Assoc. Españ. para el Progresse de las Ciencias, Congr. Coimbra 6: 23 (1925); Coniothyrium fuckelii var. ribis-aurei Gonz. Frag., Trab. Mus. Nac. Cienc. Nat., Ser. Bot. 12: 48 (1917); Diapleella coniothyrium (Fuckel) M.E. Barr, in Barr, Rogerson, Smith & Haines, Bull. N.Y. St. Mus. 459: 30 (1986); Kalmusia coniothyrium (Fuckel) Huhndorf, Bull. Ill. nat. Hist. Surv. 34(5): 500 (1992); Leptosphaeria berberidis Richon, Cat. Champ. Marn.: no. 1330 (1889); Leptosphaeria coniothyrium (Fuckel) Sacc., Nuovo G. bot. ital. 7(4): 317 (1875); Leptosphaeria coniothyrium f. berberidis (Richon) Cif., Annls mycol. 20(1/2): 51 (1922); Leptosphaeria coniothyrium var. foliicola Woron., Trudy Tiflissk. Bot. Sada 28: 18 (1913); Melanomma coniothyrium (Fuckel) L. Holm, Symb. bot. upsal. 14(no. 3): 56 (1957); Microsphaeropsis fuckelii (Sacc.) Boerema, Persoonia 18(2): 160 (2003); Paraconiothyrium fuckelii (Sacc.) Verkley & Gruyter, in Gruyter, Woudenberg, Aveskamp, Verkley, Groenewald & Crous, Stud. Mycol. 75: 25 (2012); Rhabdospora coniothyrium (Fuckel) Kuntze, Revis. gen. pl. (Leipzig) 3(3): 509 (1898); Septoria sarmenti Sacc., Syll. fung. (Abellini) 2: 29 (1883); Sphaeria coniothyrium Fuckel, Jb. nassau. Ver. Naturk. 23-24: 115 (1870)

Species of fungus

Coniothyrium fuckelii is a fungal plant pathogen, causing stem canker, and that has also been known to cause infections in immunocompromised humans.

Two diseases most commonly associated with garden rose dieback are grey mould (Botrytis cinerea) and also rose canker (Coniothyrium fuckelii, syn. Paraconiothyrium fuckelii and Leptosphaeria coniothyrium). The fungal infection of rose canker often occurs through badly timed pruning cuts or injuries to the crown of the rose plant. It then produces tiny black fruiting bodies that are only just visible on the bark of affected branches or stems. This fungus also causes cane blight disease of raspberry bushes.

== See also ==
- List of foliage plant diseases (Agavaceae)
