= Stagonospora recedens =

Scientific classification
- Domain: Eukaryota
- Kingdom: Fungi
- Division: Ascomycota
- Class: Dothideomycetes
- Order: Pleosporales
- Family: Phaeosphaeriaceae
- Genus: Stagonospora
- Species: S. recedens

Binomial name
- Stagonospora recedens (C. Massal.) F.R. Jones & Weimer, (1938)

Synonyms
- Pleospora trifolii var. recedens C. Massal.

Species of fungus

Stagonospora recedens is a fungal plant pathogen infecting red clover.
