= Paraphaeosphaeria =

Scientific classification
- Kingdom: Fungi
- Division: Ascomycota
- Class: Dothideomycetes
- Order: Pleosporales
- Family: Didymosphaeriaceae
- Genus: Paraphaeosphaeria; O.E.Erikss. (1967)

Type species
- Paraphaeosphaeria michotii (Westend.) O.E.Erikss. (1967)

Genus of fungi

Paraphaeosphaeria is a genus of fungi in the Didymosphaeriaceae family. The genus has 23 species found in Europe and North America. Anamorph forms are found in the genus Paraconiothyrium. The genus was circumscribed by O.E. Eriksson in 1967.

Species Paraphaeosphaeria minitans W.A. Campb. (1947) (formerly Coniothyrium minitans) has been used as biological control agent against soilborne diseases such as Sclerotinia, Rhizoctonia, and Verticillium.

== Species ==
As accepted by Species Fungorum;

- Paraphaeosphaeria angularis Verkley & Aa (2014)
- Paraphaeosphaeria apicicola Kohlm., Volkm.-Kohlm. & O.E. Erikss. (1999)
- Paraphaeosphaeria arecacearum Verkley, Göker & Stielow (2014)
- Paraphaeosphaeria barriae Checa (2002)
- Paraphaeosphaeria burbidgeae Y.P. Tan & R.G. Shivas (2022)
- Paraphaeosphaeria camelliae H.A. Ariyaw., I. Tsai & Thambug. (2020)
- Paraphaeosphaeria capparicola (Mundk. & S. Ahmad) S. Ahmad (1979)
- Paraphaeosphaeria concentrica (Ellis & Everh.) Huhndorf (1992)
- Paraphaeosphaeria cylindrospora (Wehm.) O.E. Erikss. (1992)
- Paraphaeosphaeria graminicola Thambug. & K.D. Hyde (2017)
- Paraphaeosphaeria hongkongensis J. Fröhl. & K.D. Hyde (2000)
- Paraphaeosphaeria hydei Z.F. Zhang & L. Cai (2020)
- Paraphaeosphaeria maximiliani (Ellis & Everh.) M.E. Barr (1992)
- Paraphaeosphaeria michotii (Westend.) O.E. Erikss. (1967)
- Paraphaeosphaeria microspora (Ellis & Everh.) Shoemaker & C.E. Babc. (1985)
- Paraphaeosphaeria minitans (W.A. Campb.) Verkley, Göker & Stielow (2014)
- Paraphaeosphaeria neglecta Verkley, Riccioni & Stielow (2014)
- Paraphaeosphaeria parmeliae Crous & Trakun. (2014)
- Paraphaeosphaeria pilleata Kohlm., Volkm.-Kohlm. & O.E. Erikss. (1996)
- Paraphaeosphaeria recurvifoliae Hyang B. Lee, K.M. Kim & H.S. Jung (2005)
- Paraphaeosphaeria rosae Wanas., E.B.G. Jones & K.D. Hyde (2018
- Paraphaeosphaeria rosicola Phukhams., Camporesi & K.D. Hyde (2018)
- Paraphaeosphaeria rubrotincta (Ellis & Everh.) Huhndorf (1996)
- Paraphaeosphaeria sardoa Verkley, W. Gams & Aa (2014)
- Paraphaeosphaeria schoenoplecti M.K.M. Wong, Goh & K.D. Hyde (2000)
- Paraphaeosphaeria spartii W.J. Li, Camporesi & K.D. Hyde (2015
- Paraphaeosphaeria sporulosa (W. Gams & Domsch) Verkley, Göker & Stielow (2014)
- Paraphaeosphaeria traversiae Y.P. Tan, Bishop-Hurley, Dhileepan & R.G. Shivas (2022)
- Paraphaeosphaeria trimerioides (Rehm) Shearer, Huhndorf & J.L. Crane (1993)
- paraphaeosphaeria verruculosa Verkley, Göker & Stielow (2014)
- Paraphaeosphaeria viciae N.I. de Silva, Camporesi & K.D. Hyde (2017)
- Paraphaeosphaeria viridescens Verkley, Göker & Stielow (2014)
- Paraphaeosphaeria xanthorrhoeae Crous (2017)

Former species;

- P. agavensis A.W. Ramaley, M.E. Palm & M.E. Barr (1997) = Phaeosphaeriopsis agavensis, Phaeosphaeriaceae
- P. castagnei (Durieu & Mont.) O.E. Erikss. (1967) = Leptosphaeria castagnei, Leptosphaeriaceae
- P. filamentosa (Ellis & Everh.) M.E. Barr (1992) = Neophaeosphaeria filamentosa, Neophaeosphaeriaceae
- P. glaucopunctata (Grev.) Shoemaker & C.E. Babc. (1985) = Phaeosphaeriopsis glaucopunctata, Phaeosphaeriaceae
- P. longispora (H. Wegelin) Crivelli (1983) = Chaetoplea longispora, Phaeosphaeriaceae
- P. nolinae A.W. Ramaley (1997) = Phaeosphaeriopsis nolinae, Phaeosphaeriaceae
- P. oblongata (Niessl) Crivelli (1983) = Chaetoplea oblongata, Phaeosphaeriaceae
- P. obtusispora (Speg.) O.E. Erikss. (1967) = Phaeosphaeriopsis obtusispora, Phaeosphaeriaceae
- P. quadriseptata M.E. Barr (1992) = Neophaeosphaeria quadriseptata, Neophaeosphaeriaceae
- P. rusci (Fr.) O.E. Erikss. (1967) = Phaeosphaeriopsis glaucopunctata, Phaeosphaeriaceae
- P. vectis (Berk. & Broome) Hedjar. (1969) = Heptameria vectis, Dothideomycetes
