= Stagonospora tainanensis =

Scientific classification
- Domain: Eukaryota
- Kingdom: Fungi
- Division: Ascomycota
- Class: Dothideomycetes
- Order: Pleosporales
- Family: Phaeosphaeriaceae
- Genus: Stagonospora
- Species: S. tainanensis

Binomial name
- Stagonospora tainanensis W.H. Hsieh, (1979)

Species of fungus

Stagonospora tainanensis is a fungal plant pathogen infecting sugarcane.
