= Plant–fungus horizontal gene transfer =

Plant–fungus horizontal gene transfer is the movement of genetic material between individuals in the plant and fungus kingdoms. Horizontal gene transfer is universal in fungi, viruses, bacteria, and other eukaryotes. Horizontal gene transfer research often focuses on prokaryotes because of the abundant sequence data from diverse lineages, and because it is assumed not to play a significant role in eukaryotes.

Most plant–fungus horizontal gene transfer events are ancient and rare, but they may have provided important gene functions leading to wider substrate use and habitat spread for plants and fungi. Since these events are rare and ancient, they have been difficult to detect and remain relatively unknown. Plant–fungus interactions could play a part in a multi-horizontal gene transfer pathway among many other organisms.

== Mechanisms ==
Fungus–plant-mediated horizontal gene transfer can occur via phagotrophic mechanisms (mediated by phagotrophic eukaryotes) and nonphagotropic mechanisms. Nonphagotrophic mechanisms have been seen in the transmission of transposable elements, plastid-derived endosymbiotic gene transfer, prokaryote-derived gene transfer, Agrobacterium tumefaciens-mediated DNA transfer, cross-species hybridization events, and gene transfer between mitochondrial genes. Horizontal gene transfer could bypass eukaryotic barrier features like linear chromatin-based chromosomes, intron–exon gene structures, and the nuclear envelope.

Horizontal gene transfer occurs between microorganisms sharing overlapping ecological niches and associations like parasitism or symbiosis. Ecological association can facilitate horizontal gene transfer in plants and fungi and is an unstudied factor in shared evolutionary histories.

Most horizontal gene transfers from fungi into plants predate the rise of land plants. A greater genomic inventory of gene family and taxon sampling has been identified as a desirable prerequisite for identifying further plant–fungus events.

== Indicators of past horizontal gene transfer ==
Evidence for gene transfer between fungi and eukaryotes is discovered indirectly. Evidence is found in the unusual features of genetic elements. These features include: inconsistency between phylogeny across genetic elements, high DNA or amino acid similarity from phylogenetically distant organisms, irregular distribution of genetic elements in a variety of species, similar genes shared among species within a specific habitat or geography independent of their phylogenetic relationship, and gene characteristics inconsistent with the resident genome such as high guanine and cytosine content, codon usage, and introns.

Alternative hypotheses and explanations for such findings include erroneous species phylogenies, inappropriate comparison of paralogous sequences, sporadic retention of shared ancestral characteristics, uneven rates of character change in other lineages, and introgressive hybridization.

The "complexity hypothesis" is a different approach to understanding why informational genes have less success in being transferred than operational genes. It has been proposed that informational genes are part of larger, more conglomerate systems, while operational genes are less complex, allowing them to be horizontally transferred at higher frequencies. The hypothesis incorporates the "continual hypothesis", which states that horizontal gene transfer is constantly occurring in operational genes.

== Examples ==
=== Horizontal gene transfer as a multi-vector pathway ===
Plant–fungus horizontal gene transfer could take place during plant infection. There are many possible vectors, such as plant–fungus–insect interactions. The ability for fungi to infect other organisms provides this possible pathway.

=== In rice ===
A fungus–plant pathway has been demonstrated in rice (Oryza sativa) through ancestral lineages. A phylogeny was constructed from 1689 identified genes and all homologs available from the rice genome (3177 gene families). Fourteen candidate plant–fungus horizontal gene transfer events were identified, nine of which showed infrequent patterns of transfer between plants and fungi. From the phylogenetic analysis, horizontal gene transfer events could have contributed to the L-fucose permease sugar transporter, zinc binding alcohol dehydrogenase, membrane transporter, phospholipase/carboxylesterase, iucA/iucC family protein in siderophore biosynthesis, DUF239 domain protein, phosphate-response 1 family protein, a hypothetical protein similar to zinc finger (C2H2-type) protein, and another conserver hypothetical protein.

=== Ancestral shikimate pathway ===
Some plants may have obtained the shikimate pathway from symbiotic fungi. Plant shikimate pathway enzymes share similarities to prokaryote homologs and could have ancestry from a plastid progenitor genome. It is possible that the shikimate pathway and the pentafunctional arom have their ancient origins in eukaryotes or were conveyed by eukaryote–eukaryote horizontal gene transfer. The evolutionary history of the pathway could have been influenced by a prokaryote-to-eukaryote gene transfer event. Ascomycete fungi along with zygomycetes, basidiomycetes, apicomplexa, ciliates, and oomycetes retained elements of an ancestral pathway given through the bikont/unikont eukaryote root.

=== Ancestral land plants ===
Fungi and bacteria could have contributed to the phenylpropanoid pathway in ancestral land plants for the synthesis of flavonoids and lignin through horizontal gene transfer. Phenylalanine ammonia lyase (PAL) is known to be present in fungi, such as Basidiomycota yeast like Rhodotorula and Ascomycota such as Aspergillus and Neurospora. These fungi participate in the catabolism of phenylalanine for carbon and nitrogen. PAL in some plants and fungi also has a tyrosine ammonia lyase (TAL) for the synthesis of p-coumaric acid into p-coumaroyl-CoA. PAL likely emerged from bacteria in an antimicrobial role. Horizontal gene transfer took place through a pre-Dikarya divergent fungal lineage and a Nostocale or soil-sediment bacterium through symbiosis. The fungal PAL was then transferred to an ancestor of a land plant by an ancient arbuscular mycorrhizal symbiosis that later developed in the phenylpropanoid pathway and land plant colonization. PAL enzymes in early bacteria and fungi could have contributed to protection against ultraviolet radiation, acted as a light capturing pigment, or assisted in antimicrobial defense.

=== Gene transfer for enhanced intermediate and secondary metabolism ===
Sterigmatocystin gene transfer has been observed with Podospora anserina and Aspergillus. Horizontal gene transfer in Aspergillus and Podospora contributed to fungal metabolic diversity in secondary metabolism. Aspergillus nidulans produces sterigmatocystin – a precursor to aflatoxins. Aspergillus was found to have horizontally transferred genes to Podospora anserina. Podospora and Aspergillus show high conservation and microsynteny sterigmatocystin/aflatoxin clusters along with intergenic regions containing 14 binding sites for AfIR, a transcription factor for the activation of sterigmatocystin/aflatoxin biosynthetic genes. Aspergillus to Podospora represents a large metabolic gene transfer which could have contributed to fungal metabolic diversity. Transposable elements and other mobile genetic elements like plasmids and viruses could allow for chromosomal rearrangement and integration of foreign genetic material. Horizontal gene transfer could have significantly contributed to fungal genome remodeling and metabolic diversity.

=== Acquired pathogenic capabilities ===
In Stagonospora and Pyrenophora, as well as in Fusarium and Alternaria, horizontal gene transfer provides a powerful mechanism for fungi to acquire pathogenic capabilities to infect a new host plant. Horizontal gene transfer and interspecific hybridization between pathogenic species allow for hybrid offspring with an expanded host range. This can cause disease outbreaks on new crops when an encoded protein is able to cause pathogenicity.

The interspecific transfer of virulence factors in fungal pathogens has been shown between Stagonospora modorum and Pyrenophora tritici-repentis, where a host-selective toxin from S. nodorum conferred virulence to P. tritici-repentis on wheat.

In Fusarium, a nonpathogenic strain was experimentally converted into a pathogen and could have contributed to pathogen adaption in large genome portions. Fusarium graminearum, Fusarium verticilliodes, and Fusarium oxysprorum are maize and tomato pathogens that produce fumonisin mycotoxins that contaminate grain. These examples highlight the apparent polyphyletic origins of host specialization and the emergence of new pathogenic lineages distinct from genetic backgrounds. The ability to transfer genetic material could increase disease in susceptible plant populations.
