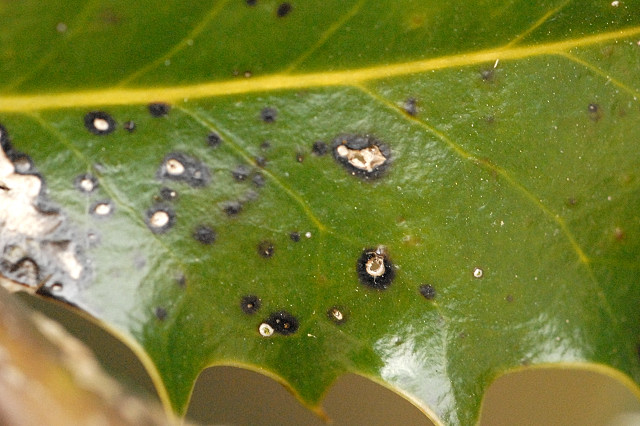
- Coniothyrium ilicis

Scientific classification
- Domain: Eukaryota
- Kingdom: Fungi
- Division: Ascomycota
- Class: Dothideomycetes
- Order: Pleosporales
- Family: Coniothyriaceae
- Genus: Coniothyrium; Corda (1840)

Type species
- Coniothyrium palmarum Corda (1840)

Synonyms
- Clisosporium Fr. (1819); Cyclobium C.Agardh (1821); Monoplodia Westend. (1859); Coniothyrinula Petr. (1923)

= Coniothyrium =

Genus of fungi

Coniothyrium is a genus of fungi in the family Coniothyriaceae. The genus was circumscribed by Czech mycologist August Carl Joseph Corda in 1840. It was formerly placed in the Phaeosphaeriaceae family until 1983 when the family was established.

The genus are diverse geographically, and have a cosmopolitan distribution across the world.

The etymology of Coniothyrium is derived from New Latin, from coni- (from conus) and thyr- (from Greek thyreos meaning oblong shield, from thyra meaning door) and -ium (ending for a genus).

Coniothyrium palmarum is the type species of the genus Coniothyrium. It is characterised by ostiolate pycnidial (asexual fruiting body) conidiomata, annellidic conidiogenous cells, the absence of conidiophores, and brown, thick-walled, 0- or 1-septate, verrucose conidia. Coniothyrium is similar morphologically to some species in the genus Microsphaeropsis. However, Microsphaeropsis is characterised by the production of phialidic conidiogenous cells with periclinal thickening, and thin-walled, pale greenish brown conidia.

Species Coniothyrium glycines (R.B. Stewart) Verkley & Gruyter (2012) is known to cause red leaf blotch on Soyabean. While Coniothyrium fuckelii is also a known plant pathogen (causing stem canker,) that has also been known to cause infections in immunocompromised humans. Coniothyrium phyllachorae Maubl. (1904) with other fungus species such as Phyllachora maydis Maubl. and Monographella maydis Müller & Samuels are the causes of Latin America tar spot complex in places such as Guatemala, Mexico, Colombia, and El Salvador.

Species Coniothyrium ferrarisianum has been isolated from leaves of Daphne mucronata Royle in Iran, it was originally isolated from Acer pseudoplatanus L. in Italy in 1958, and it was later found on Vitis vinifera L. in Canada in 2017, as well as Prunus spp. in Germany in 2020, and also from Olea europaea L. in South Africa in 2020.

== Species ==
The Species Fungorum list up to 450 species, in 2023), and the GBIF lists up to 499 species.

A selected few species are shown here.

- Coniothyrium abutilonis Khokhr. (1933)
- Coniothyrium acaciae Trotter (1916)
- Coniothyrium bambusae I. Miyake & Hara (1910)
- Coniothyrium batumense Siemaszko (1923)
- Coniothyrium caespitulosum Sacc. (1878)
- Coniothyrium carpaticum Petr. (1927)
- Coniothyrium celtidis-australis (Sacc.) Biga, Cif. & Bestagno (1959)
- Coniothyrium coffeae Zimm. (1902)
- Coniothyrium concentricum (Desm.) Sacc. (1878)
- Coniothyrium conicola Vestergr. (1902)
- Coniothyrium conorum Sacc. & Roum. (1882)
- Coniothyrium crepinianum Sacc. & Roum. (1884)
- Coniothyrium cydoniae Brunaud (1892)
- Coniothyrium dispersellum P. Karst. (1884)
- Coniothyrium dracaenae F. Stevens & Weedon (1925)
- Coniothyrium equiseti Lambotte & Fautrey (1896)
- Coniothyrium fluviatile Kabát & Bubák (1904)
- Coniothyrium fuckelii Sacc. (1876)
- Coniothyrium genistae (Roum.) Berl. & Voglino (1886)
- Coniothyrium glycines (R.B. Stewart) Verkley & Gruyter (2012)
- Coniothyrium henriquesii Thüm. (1879)
- Coniothyrium ilicis A.L. Sm. & Ramsb. (1917)
- Coniothyrium insitivum Sacc. (1878)
- Coniothyrium jasmini (Thüm.) Sacc. (1884)
- Coniothyrium juniperi Schwarzman (1968)
- Coniothyrium kallangurense B. Sutton & Alcorn (1975)
- Coniothyrium lavandulae Maire (1937)
- Coniothyrium leguminum (Rabenh.) Sacc. (1892)
- Coniothyrium marrubii Fairm. (1923)
- Coniothyrium obiones Jaap (1907)
- Coniothyrium oleae Pollacci (1911)
- Coniothyrium palmarum Corda (1840)
- Coniothyrium palmicola (Fr.) Starbäck (1894)
- Coniothyrium phlomidis Jaap (1916)
- Coniothyrium platani Sacc. (1878)
- Coniothyrium populina S. Ahmad (1971)
- Coniothyrium psammae Oudem. (1898)
- Coniothyrium pteridis A.L. Sm. (1916)
- Coniothyrium quercinum (Bonord.) Sacc. (1884)
- Coniothyrium rhododendri Henn. (1903)
- Coniothyrium rosarum Cooke & Harkn. (1882)
- Coniothyrium sarothamni (Thüm.) Sacc. (1884)
- Coniothyrium sphaerospermum Fuckel (1870)
- Coniothyrium stipae Săvul. & Sandu (1940)
- Coniothyrium tamaricis Oudem. (1901)
- Coniothyrium tenue Died. (1914)
- Coniothyrium trifolii Naumov (1913)
- Coniothyrium ulmeum P. Karst. (1884)
- Coniothyrium wernsdorffiae Laubert (1905)
- Coniothyrium yuccae Speg. (1902)
