= Stagonospora sacchari =

Scientific classification
- Domain: Eukaryota
- Kingdom: Fungi
- Division: Ascomycota
- Class: Dothideomycetes
- Order: Pleosporales
- Family: Phaeosphaeriaceae
- Genus: Stagonospora
- Species: S. sacchari

Binomial name
- Stagonospora sacchari T.T. Lo & L. Ling, (1950)

Species of fungus

Stagonospora sacchari is a fungal plant pathogen infecting sugarcane.
