= Isthmosporella =

Scientific classification
- Kingdom: Fungi
- Division: Ascomycota
- Class: Dothideomycetes
- Order: Pleosporales
- Family: Phaeosphaeriaceae
- Genus: Isthmosporella; Shearer & J.L. Crane

Type species
- Isthmosporella pulchra Shearer & J.L. Crane

Genus of fungi

Isthmosporella is a genus of fungi in the family Phaeosphaeriaceae. This is a monotypic genus, containing the single species Isthmosporella pulchra.
