= Didymocyrtis =

Didymocyrtis may refer to:

- Didymocyrtis (fungus), a Dothideomycetes incertae sedis genus
- Didymocyrtis (protist), a Spumellarian protist genus in the family Coccodiscidae and subfamily Artiscinae
