= Didymocyrtis trassii =

Scientific classification
- Domain: Eukaryota
- Kingdom: Fungi
- Division: Ascomycota
- Class: Dothideomycetes
- Order: Pleosporales
- Family: Phaeosphaeriaceae
- Genus: Didymocyrtis
- Species: D. trassii

Binomial name
- Didymocyrtis trassii Suija, Darmostuk & Khodos. (2018)

Species of lichen

Didymocyrtis trassii is a species of lichenicolous (lichen-eating) fungus in the family Phaeosphaeriaceae. It is found in southern Ukraine, where it parasitises the foliose lichen Cetraria aculeata growing on sand dunes.

== Taxonomy ==
The fungus was formally described as a new species in 2018 by Ave Suija, Valeriy Darmostuk, and Alexander Khodosovtsev. The type specimen was collected by the third author between the between villages of Burkuty and Prominin in Hola Prystan Raion (Kherson Oblast); there, it was found growing on the foliose lichen Cetraria aculeata, which itself was growing in sand dunes. The species epithet honours Estonian lichenologist and botanist Hans Trass,

== Description ==
Didymocyrtis trassii has pycnidial conidiomata of the Phoma-type. The pycnidia are black and more or less spherical, and partially immersed in the host thallus. They are typically 70–100 μm in diameter, with a wall that is 25–35 μm thick. The conidia are 14.2–18.2 by 5.0–7.2 μm. A sexual stage for the fungus is not known.

== Habitat and distribution ==
Didymocyrtis trassii is only known to occur in southern Ukraine, and it only parasitises Cetraria aculeata growing on sand. The fungus grows on the lower branches of the thick cushions of the lichen, and does not appear to cause damage to the host.
