= Turf necrotic ring spot =

Scientific classification
- Kingdom: Fungi
- Division: Ascomycota
- Class: Dothideomycetes
- Order: Pleosporales
- Family: Phaeosphaeriaceae
- Genus: Ophiosphaerella
- Species: O. korrae

Binomial name
- Ophiosphaerella korrae (J. Walker & A.M. Sm. bis) Shoemaker & C.E. Babc.

Species of fungus

Necrotic ring spot is a common disease of turf caused by soil borne fungi (Ophiosphaerella korrae) that mainly infects roots (4). It is an important disease as it destroys the appearance of turfgrasses on park, playing fields and golf courses. Necrotic Ring Spot is caused by a fungal pathogen that is an ascomycete that produces ascospores in an ascocarp (6). They survive over winter, or any unfavorable condition as sclerotia. Most infection occurs in spring and fall, when the temperature is about 13 to 28 °C (5). The primary hosts of this disease are cool-season grasses such as Kentucky bluegrass and annual bluegrass (6). Once turf is infected with O. korrae, it kills turf roots and crowns. Symptoms of the disease are quite noticeable since they appear as large yellow ring-shaped patches of dead turf. Management of the disease is often uneasy and requires application of multiple controls. The disease can be controlled by many different kind of controls, including chemicals and cultural.

== Hosts and symptoms ==
Turf necrotic ring spot is known to infect various bluegrass and turfgrass species, especially the cool-season grasses. The fungus also infects fescues and bentgrasses (11). It is common in sodded lawns, rapidly growing lawns, and lawns with layered soil (3). The pathogen produces circular patches of bald spots that are tan or yellow in color (12). These patches are about 5 to 10 cm in diameter, but can grow to be about 1 meter in diameter. Eventually, as the infected turf dies, the spots turn brown. Within the patch, there may be areas of living grass at the center, creating a frog-eye appearance that this pathogen is known for. This is the result of the turf in the center surviving or being recolonized by healthy grass (3).

While the infection happens during cooler seasons, such as fall and spring, the symptoms can carry into summer (7). Should the disease continue through the summer, it may cause the crown and roots to become blackened with visible mycelium (11). As previously mentioned, this disease alters the grass by creating patches of yellow or tan dead grass (1). Another possible symptom is leaf lesions. Leaf lesions are often common among fungal diseases. If there are leaf lesions on the blade, the lesions will be inconsistent in terms of size and shape. The lesions may also be varying colors, such as yellow, tan, or dark brown (11).

== Disease cycle ==
Ophiosphaerella korrae is a member of Ascomycota, a phylum of fungi. They produce ascospores as a sexual reproductive structure in flask-shaped pseudothecia that are formed on roots and crowns of infected turf (6). The pathogens survive unfavorable seasons as sclerotia, which are compacted mycelium that live in plant debris. In optimal conditions, cool and humid weather, the sclerotia germinate and start infecting roots of turf and pseudothecia produce ascospores throughout growing season of turf. The pathogens are spread by grass trimming equipment such as a lawn mower as they carry the plant debris that contains the scelerotia (13). In addition, the hyphae from an infected plant invade other nearby plants as they grow outside of roots and rhizomes (10). Black mycelium as known as “runner hyphae” grow on surface of infected roots and colonize nearby healthy roots around them. The hyphae then penetrate the roots and infect inside of the root cortex causing decreased ability of the plant to take up nutrients and water from soil and ultimately cause plant death. An asexual reproductive stage of the pathogen has not been discovered yet and is thought to have only a sexual reproductive stage. The only species that has been reported to have an anamorph within genus Ophiosphaerella is O. herpotricha (6).

== Environment ==
Turf necrotic ring pathogen requires cooler temperatures. The temperatures of spring and fall are ideal for this pathogen, as they are cool to warm and damp. The pathogen also requires soils lower in nitrogen (2). Factors such as high soil pH and the correct level of moisture are critical for the development of this disease. So fertilizer and watering frequency (or infrequency) are crucial environmental factors for this pathogen. However, it is possible for this fungal pathogen to grow past the growing season and throughout summer. O. korrae certainly benefits from thicker and more compact soil layers. It also benefits from thicker thatch layers (11). To summarize, the conditions that provide the most severity for this disease are environments of cooler temperatures, high dense thatch, a lower mowing height, and incorrect application and timing of fertilization (Nitrogen content too low) (11). Excessive watering may also promote disease growth.

== Management ==
Necrotic ring spot can be managed through chemical and cultural controls. Cultural control includes the use of ammonium sulfate or other acidifying fertilizers to suppress the pathogen by lowering the pH of the soil to between 6.0 and 6.2. The more acidic soil discourages the activity of O. korrae (9) When reducing pH to these levels, additional manganese applications should be undertaken to compensate for lower pH. As of now, there are only two resistant cultivars of bluegrass, which are ‘Riviera’, and ‘Patriot’ (9). One component of their resistance could be that they are tolerant to low temperature, because the grass is more susceptible to the pathogen under colder temperatures(8). In addition, reducing watering inputs and growing turf on well drained soils can lessen disease symptoms.

Many different fungicides are used to control the pathogen, Fenarimol, Propiconazole, Myclobutanil, and Azoxystrobin (8). Historically, Fenarimol and Myclobutanil were predominantly used (14). In a study where diluted pesticides were sprayed throughout infested test plots, Fenarimol was found to be the most effective with a 94.6% reduction of the disease. Myclobutanil also decreased the amount of disease, but only by 37.7% (8). Myclobutanil is generally recognized as a very weakly acting demethylation inhibitor (DMI) fungicide and fenarimol is no longer registered for turf so a number of other DMI fungicides have been employed successfully, including Propiconazole, Tebuconazole, Metconazole and others. Pyraclostrobin and Fluoxastrobin have also been used to control the pathogen.

== Importance ==
This pathogen is important because it affects homeowners lawns and also golf courses. It also affects parks and recreational areas. It is important because it can impede people and their ability to enjoy their landscapes. The dead patches are also unsightly, so it is important to control the disease, and keep it from spreading.
