= Stagonospora meliloti =

Scientific classification
- Domain: Eukaryota
- Kingdom: Fungi
- Division: Ascomycota
- Class: Dothideomycetes
- Order: Pleosporales
- Family: Phaeosphaeriaceae
- Genus: Stagonospora
- Species: S. meliloti

Binomial name
- Stagonospora meliloti (Lasch) Petr., (1919)

Synonyms
- Depazea meliloti Lasch

Species of fungus

Stagonospora meliloti is a plant pathogen infecting alfalfa.
