= Hendersonia =

Hendersonia may refer to:

- Hendersonia (fungus), a genus of fungi in the family Phaeosphaeriaceae
- Hendersonia (gastropod), a genus of gastropods in the family Helicinidae
- Hendersonia, a genus of protists in the family Heterohelicidae, synonym of Parasigalia
