= Setomelanomma =

Scientific classification
- Domain: Eukaryota
- Kingdom: Fungi
- Division: Ascomycota
- Class: Dothideomycetes
- Order: Pleosporales
- Family: Phaeosphaeriaceae
- Genus: Setomelanomma; M. Morelet

Type species
- Setomelanomma holmii M. Morelet

Genus of fungi

Setomelanomma is a genus of fungi in the family Phaeosphaeriaceae. This is a monotypic genus, containing the single species Setomelanomma holmii M. Morelet (1980)

== Former Species ==
As listed by Species Fungorum;

- S. monoceras (Alcorn) S.A. Ahmed, Sande, D.A. Stevens, Fahal, Van Diepen., Menken & de Hoog (2014) = Exserohilum monoceras, Pleosporaceae
- S. rostrata (K.J. Leonard) B.J. Green, Beezhold, Z. Gallinger, C.S. Barron, R. Melvin, T.A. Bledsoe, Kashon & G.L. Sussman (2014) = Exserohilum rostratum, Pleosporaceae
