= Mixtura =

Scientific classification
- Kingdom: Fungi
- Division: Ascomycota
- Class: Dothideomycetes
- Order: Pleosporales
- Family: Phaeosphaeriaceae
- Genus: Mixtura; O.E. Erikss. & J.Z. Yue

Type species
- Mixtura saginata O.E. Erikss. & J.Z. Yue

Genus of fungi

Mixtura is a genus of fungi in the family Phaeosphaeriaceae. It is a monotypic genus, containing the single species Mixtura saginata.
