= Coniothyrium glycines =

Scientific classification
- Kingdom: Fungi
- Division: Ascomycota
- Class: Dothideomycetes
- Order: Pleosporales
- Family: Coniothyriaceae
- Genus: Coniothyrium
- Species: C. glycines

Binomial name
- Coniothyrium glycines (R.B. Stewart) Verkley & Gruyter, 2012

Synonyms
- Dactuliochaeta glycines (R.B. Stewart) G.L. Hartm. & J.B. Sinclair (1988); Dactuliophora glycines C.L. Leakey (1964); Phoma glycinicola Gruyter & Boerema (2002); Pyrenochaeta glycines R.B. Stewart (1957)

Species of fungus

Coniothyrium glycines is a fungal plant pathogen infecting soybean.

== History ==
This fungus species has undergone various name changes. Originally described in 1957, from soyabean leaf lesions and it was classified as a new species in the genus Pyrenochaeta, published as Pyrenochaeta glycines R.B. Stewart, due to the pycnidial stage (when shaped like a bulging vase) (Stewart, 1957). In another study, the pycnidial state was not observed, but sclerotia (a compact mass of hardened fungal mycelium containing food reserves) were seen within soyabean leaf lesions associated with red leaf blotch, and a new genus was formed and the fungus was published as Dactuliophora glycines C.L. Leakey on the basis of the sclerotial stage (Leakey, 1964). In 1986, Dactuliophora glycines was thought to be the sclerotial state of Pyrenochaeta glycines (Datnoff et al., 1986a). In 1988, the genus Dactuliochaeta was established to contain Pyrenochaeta glycines and its synanamorph, Dactuliophora glycines (Hartman and Sinclair, 1988). In 2002, the fungus was then classified as a Phoma species on the basis of its similar production of pycniospores to other species of Phoma and the species was re-named Phoma glycinicola Gruyter & Boerema (de Gruyter and Boerema, 2002). In 2013, the fungus was placed in the genus Coniothyrium and then named as Coniothyrium glycines (R.B. Stewart) Verkley & Gruyter (de Gruyter et al., 2013) as a new combination because of its similarity of pycniospore production to that of other species in the genus Coniothyrium, which differ from Phoma. In the original description it was noted that the conidia were greenish-yellow in mass (Stewart, 1957), resembling coniothyrium-like conidia (de Gruyter et al., 2012). The fungus is unique as it produces well-defined, melanized sclerotia that can be infectious, or the species can produce pycnidia on their surface that then also produce infectious conidia (Hartman and Sinclair, 1988).

== See also ==
- List of soybean diseases
