= Carinispora =

Scientific classification
- Kingdom: Fungi
- Division: Ascomycota
- Class: Dothideomycetes
- Order: Pleosporales
- Family: Phaeosphaeriaceae
- Genus: Carinispora; K.D. Hyde

Type species
- Carinispora nypae K.D. Hyde

Genus of fungi

Carinispora is a genus of fungi in the family Phaeosphaeriaceae. This is a monotypic genus, containing the single species Carinispora nypae.
