= Phaeosphaeriopsis obtusispora =

Scientific classification
- Kingdom: Fungi
- Division: Ascomycota
- Class: Dothideomycetes
- Order: Pleosporales
- Family: Phaeosphaeriaceae
- Genus: Phaeosphaeriopsis
- Species: P. obtusispora

Binomial name
- Phaeosphaeriopsis obtusispora (Speg.) M.P.S. Câmara, M.E. Palm & A.W. Ramaley, (2003)

Synonyms
- Leptosphaeria obtusispora Speg., (1881); Paraphaeosphaeria obtusispora (Speg.) O.E. Erikss., (1967)

Species of fungus

Phaeosphaeriopsis obtusispora is a fungal plant pathogen.

== See also ==
- List of foliage plant diseases (Agavaceae)
