= Amarenomyces =

Scientific classification
- Kingdom: Fungi
- Division: Ascomycota
- Class: Dothideomycetes
- Order: Pleosporales
- Family: Phaeosphaeriaceae
- Genus: Amarenomyces; O.E.Erikss. (1981)

Type species
- Amarenomyces dactylidis Mapook, Camporesi & K.D. Hyde (2017)

Genus of fungi

Amarenomyces is a genus of fungi in the family Phaeosphaeriaceae. A monotypic genus, it contains the single species Amarenomyces dactylidis Mapook, Camporesi & K.D. Hyde (2017) A former species A. ammophilae (Lasch) O.E. Erikss. (1981) is now Amarenographium metableticum (still in the same Phaeosphaeriaceae family).

The associated anamorph is the genus Amarenographium.
