= Phoma draconis =

Scientific classification
- Domain: Eukaryota
- Kingdom: Fungi
- Division: Ascomycota
- Class: Dothideomycetes
- Order: Pleosporales
- Family: Didymellaceae
- Genus: Phoma
- Species: P. draconis

Binomial name
- Phoma draconis (Berk. ex Cooke) Boerema (1983)

Synonyms
- Phyllosticta draconi Berk. ex Cooke, Welw. F. Port.

Species of fungus

Phoma draconis is a fungal plant pathogen.

== See also ==
- List of foliage plant diseases (Agavaceae)
