= Lautitia =

Scientific classification
- Kingdom: Fungi
- Division: Ascomycota
- Class: Dothideomycetes
- Order: Pleosporales
- Family: Phaeosphaeriaceae
- Genus: Lautitia; S. Schatz

Type species
- Lautitia danica (Berl.) S. Schatz

Genus of fungi

Lautitia is a genus of fungi in the family Phaeosphaeriaceae. This is a monotypic genus, containing the single species Lautitia danica.
