= Coniothyrium rosarum =

Scientific classification
- Domain: Eukaryota
- Kingdom: Fungi
- Division: Ascomycota
- Class: Dothideomycetes
- Order: Pleosporales
- Family: Coniothyriaceae
- Genus: Coniothyrium
- Species: C. rosarum

Binomial name
- Coniothyrium rosarum Cooke & Harkn. (1882)

Synonyms
- Clisosporium rosarum (Cooke & Harkn.) Kuntze (1898)

Species of fungus

Coniothyrium rosarum is a species of fungus in the family Coniothyriaceae.
