= William Bridge Cooke =

American mycologist

William Bridge Cooke (July 16, 1908 – December 30, 1991) was an American mycologist. He specialized in fungal ecology and taxonomy, with on emphasis on the Polyporaceae. He was the author of at least 192 publications and five books. Cooke also published many fungal taxa: 3 subfamilies, 10 genera, 1 section, 144 new species, 4 subspecies and varieties, and 141 new combinations. Cooke received a Bachelor's degree in botany from the University of Cincinnati in 1932, and a Master of Science in 1939 at Oregon State University. After serving in the army during World War II, Cooke obtained a Ph.D. in 1950 from the Washington State University under the supervision of Rexford F. Daubenmire. With Charles Gardner Shaw he edited the exsiccata Reliquiae Suksdorfiana. Fungi collected by Wilhelm N. Suksdorf 1882-1927.

Cooke died in Cincinnati, Ohio, at the age of 83.

Several taxa have been named in Cooke's honor: the fungi Bricookea M.E.Barr, Bridgeoporus T.J.Volk, Burds. & Ammirati, Bahusakala cookei M.B.Ellis, Choiromyces cookei Gilkey, Clathrospora cookei, Microsporium cookei L.Ajello, Phaeosphaeria cookei Shoemaker & Babcock, and Glyceria cookei Swallen (Graminae), and Phacelia cookei Heckard & Constance (Hydrophyllaceae).

== See also ==
- List of mycologists
