= Paraphaeosphaeria pilleata =

Scientific classification
- Domain: Eukaryota
- Kingdom: Fungi
- Division: Ascomycota
- Class: Dothideomycetes
- Order: Pleosporales
- Family: Didymosphaeriaceae
- Genus: Paraphaeosphaeria
- Species: P. pilleata

Binomial name
- Paraphaeosphaeria pilleata Kohlm., Volkm.-Kohlm. & O.E.Erikss. (1996)
- Known only from the Atlantic Coast of North Carolina

Species of fungus

Paraphaeosphaeria pilleata is a species of fungus in the Didymosphaeriaceae family. The species fruits exclusively in the lower parts of the culms of the black needlerush (Juncus roemerianus). It is found on the Atlantic Coast of North Carolina.

== Taxonomy and naming ==
The species was first described by mycologists Jan Kohlmeyer, Brigitte Volkmann-Kohlmeyer, and Ove Eriksson in a 1996 Mycological Research publication. The specific epithet is derived from Latin pilleatus ("capped"), and refers to the small cap on the top of the ascus.

== Description ==
The roughly spherical to ellipsoidal leathery fruit bodies (ascomata) are 120–300 μm high by 150–350 μm wide, with a short neck, and an ostiole (opening). The neck is 15–50 μm high, 42–70 μm in diameter, cylindrical to conical, and dark brown. The ascomata are immersed in the hard cortex of the host plant, with bases embedded in the pith. The ascomata are light brown in color, but darker around the ostiole. They are arranged in groups. The ascomata lack paraphyses; the ostiolar canal is formed when pseudoparenchymatous cells in the center of the neck dissolve or tear apart. In mature ascomata, the tips of the pseudoparaphyses reach into the canal. The peridium is 8–16 μm thick, and made of 3–5 layers of brown, thin-walled cells with large lumina that eventually merge with hyaline (translucent) cells to form a textura angularis—a pseudoparenchyma of very densely packed cells that appear angular in cross section. The hamathecium (a term referring to all hyphae that develop between asci of the hymenium) comprises unbranched pseudoparaphyses. These cells are septate, with constrictions at the septa, and measure 1.5–3 μm in diameter. In immature ascomata they are attached both at the top and the bottom, and fill the entire centrum before asci have developed; they join at the top under the neck before the ostiolar canal is formed.

The asci (spore-bearing cells) are eight-spored, club-shaped to cylindrical, and measure 60–80 by 10–12 μm. Spores are arranged in two parallel rows in the ascus. They are supported on a short stalk, thick-walled, and fissitunicate, meaning the inner wall pops completely out of the outer wall during dehiscence. In this process, a small flat cap retracts to form a roughly spherical or irregular, temporary structure at the tip of the ascus. The ascospores are 15.5–23.5 by 4.5–6 μm, cylindrical to elongated ellipsoidal, two- (rarely three-) septate, constricted at the septa. Olive-brown in color, they are surrounded by a uniform gelatinous sheath about 6 μm thick, and have an umbilicus (a single compact strand of fused hyphae) at the top. The primary septum is initially laid down in the lower third of the ascospore, and the larger, upper hemispores are subsequently divided by a transverse septum. The ascospores germinate readily from one or several cells. When grown in pure culture, the fungus forms conidiomata that make ellipsoidal, one-celled, brown conidia, measuring 4.5–7 by 2.5–3.5 μm.

Paraphaeosphaeria michotii has a rather similar morphology to P. pilleata, but can be distinguished microscopically by the lack of both an umbilicus and an evanescent cap on the tips of the asci. Additionally, P. michotti has narrower ascomata (up to 250 μm wide), a thinner peridium (16 μm), and branched pseudoparaphyses.

== Habitat and distribution ==
Paraphaeosphaeria pilleata grows on the dead or dying culms of the rush Juncus roemerianus. The fungus is considered halotolerant because it is usually found 19 and 133 cm (7.5 and 52.4 in) above the rhizome, and is thus regularly exposed to salt spray. It is found on the Atlantic Coast of the United States.
