= Coniothyrium celtidis-australis =

Scientific classification
- Domain: Eukaryota
- Kingdom: Fungi
- Division: Ascomycota
- Class: Dothideomycetes
- Order: Pleosporales
- Family: Coniothyriaceae
- Genus: Coniothyrium
- Species: C. celtidis-australis

Binomial name
- Coniothyrium celtidis-australis (Sacc.) Biga, Cif. & Bestagno (1959)

Synonyms
- Coniothyrium olivaceum var. celtidis-australis Sacc. (1884)

Species of fungus

Coniothyrium celtidis-australis is a species of fungus in the family Coniothyriaceae.
