= Ochrocladosporium =

Scientific classification
- Domain: Eukaryota
- Kingdom: Fungi
- Division: Ascomycota
- Class: Dothideomycetes
- Order: Pleosporales
- Family: Coniothyriaceae
- Genus: Ochrocladosporium; Crous & U.Braun

Genus of fungi

Ochrocladosporium is a genus of fungi belonging to the family Coniothyriaceae.

The species of this genus are found in Europe and Northern America.

Species:

- Ochrocladosporium adansoniae Crous & Cruyw.
- Ochrocladosporium elatum (Harz) Crous & U.Braun
- Ochrocladosporium frigidarii Crous & U.Braun
