= List of foliage plant diseases (Agavaceae) =

This is a list of diseases of foliage plants belonging to the family Asparagaceae.

== Plant Species ==
Plant species
C	Cordyline sp.	Ti plant
Ds	D. sanderana	Belgian Evergreen
S	Sansevieria spp.	mother-in-law-tongue
Y	Yucca spp.	soft tip yucca, Spanish-Bayonet

== Bacterial diseases ==
Bacterial diseases
Common name	Scientific name	Plants affected
Bacterial leaf spot	Erwinia carotovora subsp. carotovora	D, Ds
Bacterial leaf spot	E. chrysanthemi	D, Ds
Bacterial leaf spot	E. herbicola	Ds
Bacterial leaf spot	Pseudomonas sp.	Ds
Erwinia blight	Erwinia carotovora subsp. carotovora	C, D, S
Erwinia blight	E. chrysanthemi	C, D, S

== Fungal diseases ==
Fungal diseases
Common name	Scientific name	Plants affected
Anthracnose	Glomerella cingulata Colletotrichum gloeosporioides [anamorph]	C, D
Brown leaf spot	Paraphaeosphaeria obtusispora = Leptosphaeria obtusispora Coniothyrium henriquesii [anamorph]	Y
Fusarium leaf spot	Fusarium moniliforme Gibberella fujikuroi [teleomorph]	D
Gray leaf spot	Cytosporina sp.	Y
Gray mold	Botrytis cinerea	D, Ds, Sa
Phyllosticta leaf spot	Phyllosticta spp. Phyllosticta draconi	C, Ds
Phytophthora stem rot	Phytophthora nicotianae var. parasitica = Phytophthora parasitica	C, D
Red leaf spot	Fusarium moniliforme	S
Southern blight	Sclerotium rolfsii	all
Stem rot	Aspergillus niger	Ds, S

== Nematodes, parasitic ==
Nematodes, parasitic
Common name	Scientific name	Plants affected
Lesion	Pratylenchus spp.	C, D
Root-knot	Meloidogyne incognita	S
