= Bricookea =

Scientific classification
- Domain: Eukaryota
- Kingdom: Fungi
- Division: Ascomycota
- Class: Dothideomycetes
- Order: Pleosporales
- Family: Phaeosphaeriaceae
- Genus: Bricookea; M.E.Barr (1982)

Type species
- Bricookea sepalorum (Vleugel) M.E.Barr (1982)

Genus of fungi

Bricookea is a genus of fungi in the family Phaeosphaeriaceae. It is named in honor of mycologist William Bridge Cooke.
