= Mauginiella =

Scientific classification
- Kingdom: Fungi
- Division: Ascomycota
- Class: Dothideomycetes
- Order: Pleosporales
- Family: Phaeosphaeriaceae
- Genus: Mauginiella; Cavara
- Species: M. scaettae

Binomial name
- Mauginiella scaettae Cavara (1925)

Synonyms
- Geotrichum scaettae (Cavara) Maire (1938)

Genus of fungi

Mauginiella scaettae is an ascomycete fungus that is a plant pathogen. It is the only species in the genus Mauginiella.
