= Wilmia =

Scientific classification
- Kingdom: Fungi
- Division: Ascomycota
- Class: Dothideomycetes
- Order: Pleosporales
- Family: Phaeosphaeriaceae
- Genus: Wilmia; Dianese, Inácio & Dornelo-Silva

Type species
- Wilmia brasiliensis Dianese, Inácio & Dornelo-Silva

Genus of fungi

Wilmia is a genus of fungi in the family Phaeosphaeriaceae. This is a monotypic genus, containing the single species Wilmia brasiliensis.
