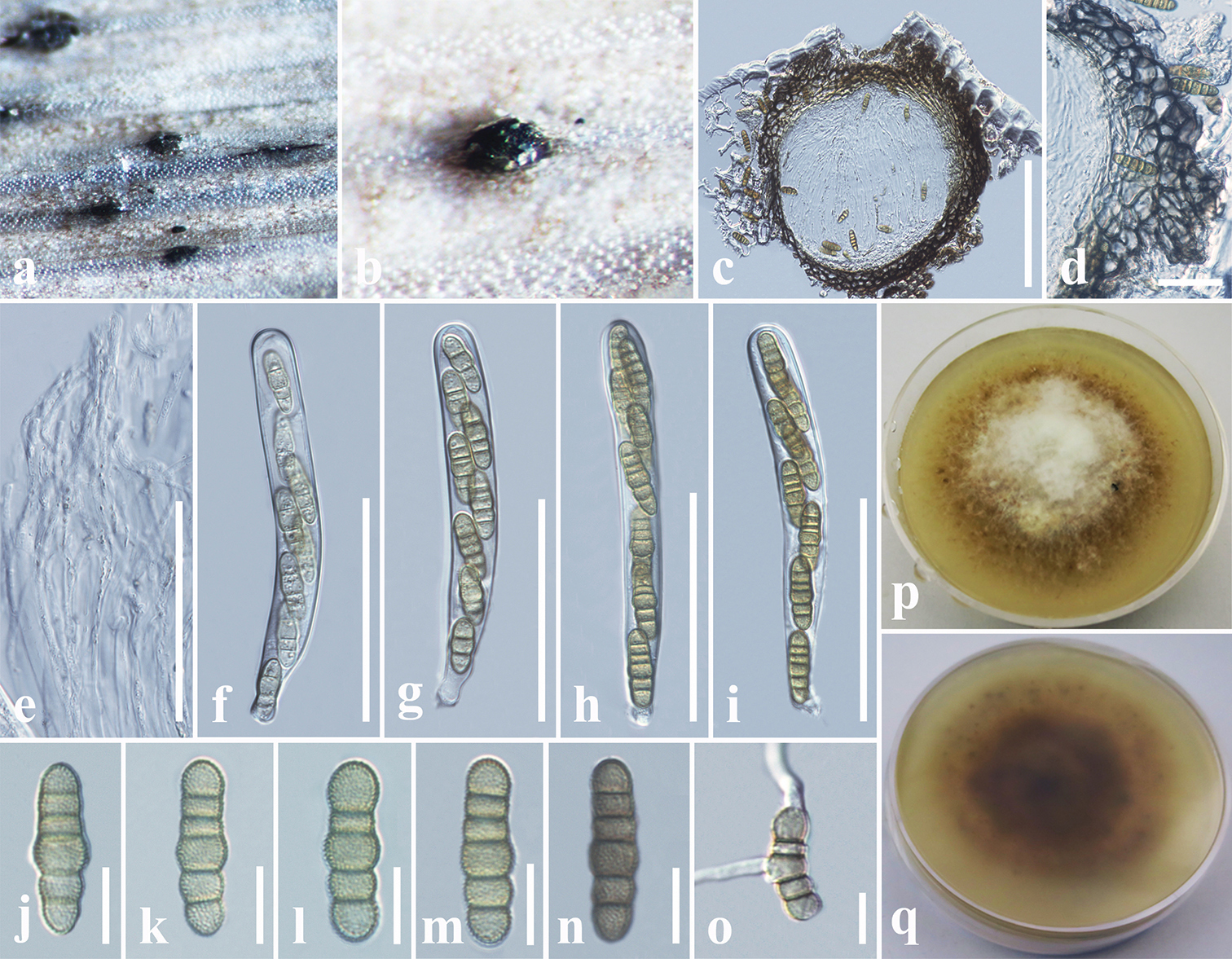
- Phaeosphaeriopsis beaucarneae

Scientific classification
- Kingdom: Fungi
- Division: Ascomycota
- Class: Dothideomycetes
- Order: Pleosporales
- Family: Phaeosphaeriaceae
- Genus: Phaeosphaeriopsis; M.P.S. Câmara, M.E. Palm & A.W. Ramaley

Type species
- Phaeosphaeriopsis glaucopunctata (Grev.) M.P.S. Câmara, M.E. Palm & A.W. Ramaley

= Phaeosphaeriopsis =

Genus of fungi

Phaeosphaeriopsis is a genus of fungi in the family Phaeosphaeriaceae.

== Species ==
As accepted by Species Fungorum;

- Phaeosphaeriopsis agapanthi Crous & M.J. Wingf. (2016)
- Phaeosphaeriopsis agavacearum Crous & Thangavel (2016)
- Phaeosphaeriopsis agavensis (A.W. Ramaley, M.E. Palm & M.E. Barr) M.P.S. Câmara, M.E. Palm & A.W. Ramaley (2003)
- Phaeosphaeriopsis aloes Crous & Y. Marín (2019)
- Phaeosphaeriopsis aloicola Crous & Y. Marín (2019)
- Phaeosphaeriopsis amblyospora A.W. Ramaley (2003)
- Phaeosphaeriopsis beaucarneae Tennakoon, C.H. Kuo & K.D. Hyde (2020)
- Phaeosphaeriopsis dracaenicola Phook. & K.D. Hyde (2014)
- Phaeosphaeriopsis glaucopunctata (Grev.) M.P.S. Câmara, M.E. Palm & A.W. Ramaley (2003)
- Phaeosphaeriopsis grevilleae Crous & Y. Marín (2019)
- Phaeosphaeriopsis musae Arzanlou & Crous (2006)
- Phaeosphaeriopsis nolinae (A.W. Ramaley) M.P.S. Câmara, M.E. Palm & A.W. Ramaley (2003)
- Phaeosphaeriopsis obtusispora (Speg.) M.P.S. Câmara, M.E. Palm & A.W. Ramaley (2003)
- Phaeosphaeriopsis omaniana Al-Jaradi, Al-Sadi & Maharachch. (2020)
- Phaeosphaeriopsis pseudoagavacearum Crous & Y. Marín (2019)
- Phaeosphaeriopsis sansevieriae Crous (2021)
- Phaeosphaeriopsis yuccae Dayar., Bulgakov, E.B.G. Jones & K.D. Hyde (2017)

Former species;

- P. phacidiomorpha (Ces.) D.F. Farr & M.E. Palm (2006) = Glomerella phacidiomorpha, Glomerellaceae
- P. vectis (Berk. & Broome) C. Hahn & Zurinski (2014) = Heptameria vectis, Dothideomycetes
