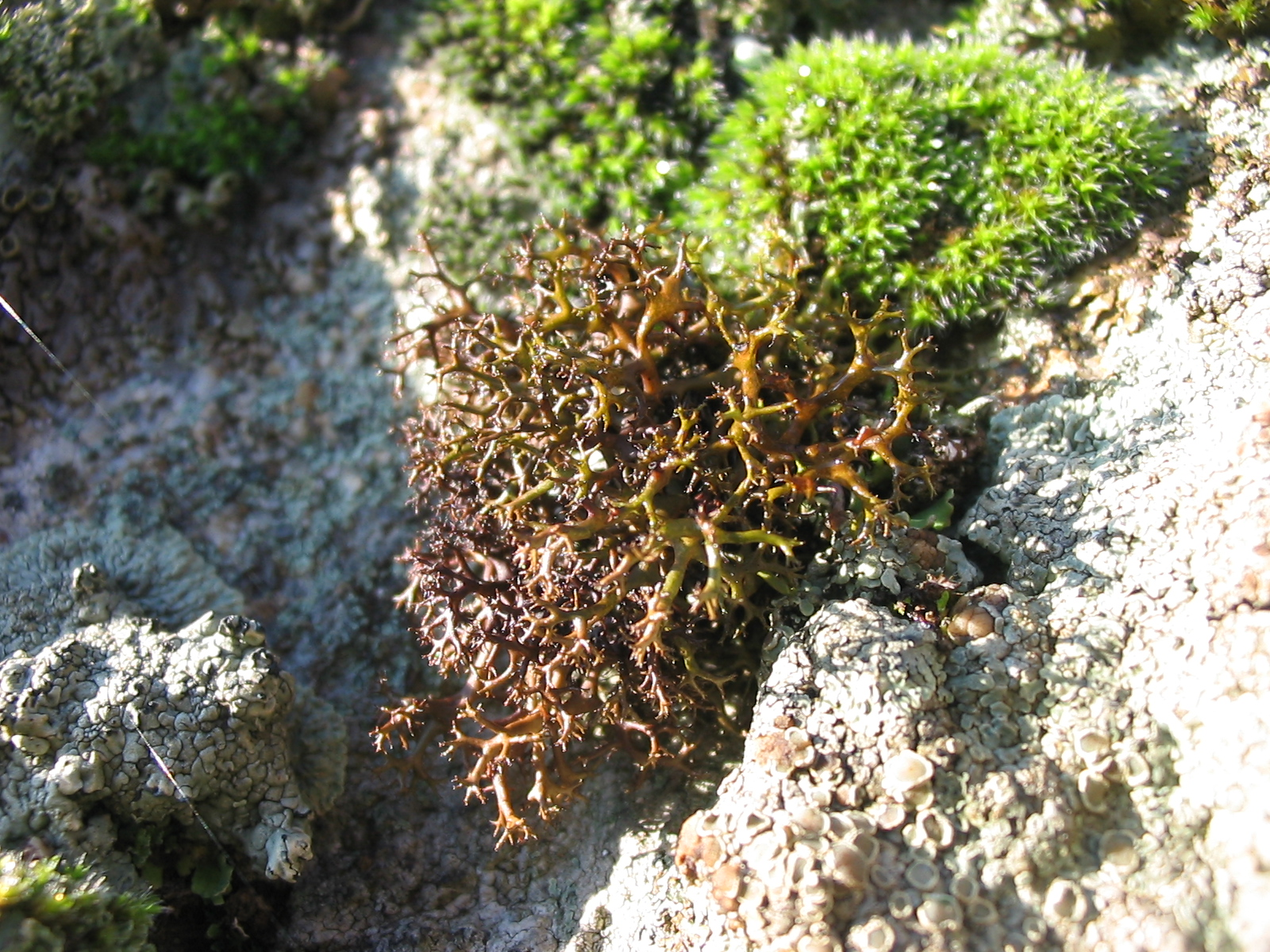

Conservation status
- Secure (NatureServe)

Scientific classification
- Kingdom: Fungi
- Division: Ascomycota
- Class: Lecanoromycetes
- Order: Lecanorales
- Family: Parmeliaceae
- Genus: Cetraria
- Species: C. aculeata

Binomial name
- Cetraria aculeata (Schreb.) Fr. (1826)

Synonyms
- Lichen aculeatus Schreb. (1771); Cetraria steppae (Savicz) Kärnefelt (1993)

= Cetraria aculeata =

Species of lichen-forming fungus

Cetraria aculeata, the spiny Iceland lichen, is a dark brown to black fruticose lichen in the family Parmeliaceae. First described by Schreber in 1771 as Lichen aculeatus, it was transferred through several genera before being placed in Cetraria. The thallus forms shrubby tufts up to 5 cm (2.0 in) tall and reproduces mainly by fragmentation rather than ascospores.

The species has a wide, bipolar distribution, occurring from the maritime Antarctic to the high Arctic and, at intermediate latitudes, in montane, steppe, and coastal habitats. Phylogeographic evidence suggests it evolved in the Northern Hemisphere and spread southward during the Pleistocene. Its broad ecological range has been linked to variation in its green algal photobiont partners, and it also harbours characteristic communities of associated alphaproteobacteria. Although globally widespread, some isolated tropical mountain populations are considered at risk of local extinction.

== Taxonomy ==
The species was first described by German naturalist Johann Christian Daniel Edler von Schreber in 1771 under the name of Lichen aculeatus. Later on, Erik Acharius, the "father of lichenology" gave it a name of Cornicularia aculeata, which lately has been changed to Coelocaulon aculeatum. Finally, the taxonomic revision of Ingvar Kärnefelt and colleagues assigned the species to the genus Cetraria.

A 2013 study of Ukrainian populations concluded that Cetraria steppae is not distinct from C. aculeata. Characters previously used to separate the two, including growth form, branch width, and the presence of norstictic acid, varied continuously and did not support species-level separation. The authors therefore treated C. steppae as a synonym of C. aculeata, and interpreted norstictic acid-bearing material as a chemotype rather than a separate species.

== Description ==
The thalli of Cetraria aculeata form shrubby tufts of up to 1–5 cm height, main branches are from 1 to 4 mm wide, terminal branches up to 1 mm wide, chemical spot tests K and P both negative. The species is found fertile, and seems to propagate mainly by thallus fragmentation. Despite the apparent lack of ascospores, which can be dispersed across long distances, C. aculeata has a very wide distribution. It is frequent in open polar and boreal environments from the maritime Antarctic to the high Arctic. At intermediate latitudes it is mostly found in high mountain ecosystems, as well as its distributional range also extends into forest gaps, woodland and steppe ecosystems, or coastal and riparian sand deposits of the Mediterranean and temperate zones. Although Cetraria aculeata is widespread globally, some isolated tropical mountain populations appear to be at local or national risk of extinction, including those in East Africa and South America.

A 2013 review of phylogeographic studies suggested that Cetraria aculeata evolved in the Northern Hemisphere and later spread into the Southern Hemisphere during the Pleistocene. The same review noted that Antarctic populations have very low genetic diversity, consistent with southward colonization followed by little ongoing genetic exchange with northern populations.

== Similar species ==
Several morphologically similar and genetically close taxa have been placed in the Cetraria aculeata complex. However, a study of Ukrainian material found that specimens identified as C. steppae fell within the variation of C. aculeata and should not be maintained as a separate species. Species limits in the Cetraria aculeata group remain difficult, and C. muricata can be extremely hard to distinguish from C. aculeata in the field. The species shows continuous variation in thallus size and branch width, and nearly unattached "vagrant" tufts can occur alongside attached thalli. Nadyeina and colleagues therefore regarded these growth forms as unreliable on their own for separating putative species within the group.

== Conservation ==
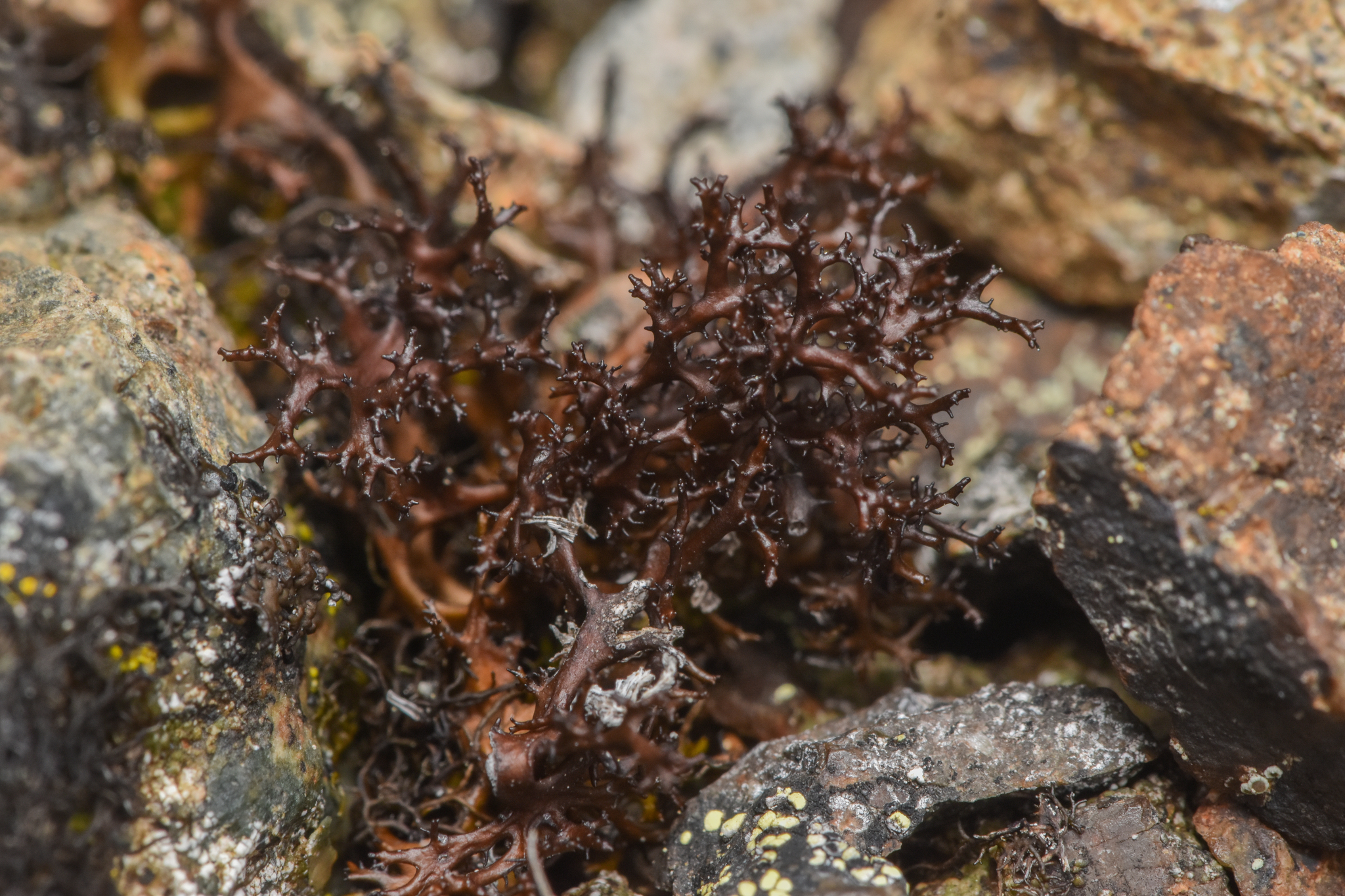
In British Columbia, Canada

In Ukraine, Cetraria aculeata (in the loose sense, or sensu lato) was assessed as regionally vulnerable. The authors noted that Ukrainian populations occupy fragile habitats such as sand dunes, steppe sites, and rock outcrops, and that recovery after disturbance is likely to be slow because the species reproduces there only vegetatively.

== Ecology ==
Cetraria aculeata is a known host to several lichenicolous fungus species, including Lichenopeltella cetrariicola, Acremonium lichenicola, Clypeococcum cetrariae, Didymocyrtis cladoniicola, Didymocyrtis trassii, Endococcus parmeliarum, Lichenoconium eroden, Eonema pyriforme, Katherinomyces cetrariae, Sphaerellothecium aculeatae, and Taeniolella rolfii.

A molecular study found that Cetraria aculeata associates with a single phylogenetic lineage of the green algal species Trebouxia jamesii. Temperate populations consistently contained a distinct photobiont lineage, and the authors suggested that an earlier switch in algal partners may have helped the species colonize both temperate and polar habitats. A later review likewise linked the species' broad environmental range to variation in its algal partners, concluding that photobiont switching probably broadened its ecological niche and was followed by genetic isolation among geographically separated populations.

In addition to its fungal and algal partners, Cetraria aculeata harbours characteristic communities of associated Alphaproteobacteria. A study of populations from Antarctica, Iceland, Germany, and Spain found that these communities were dominated by Acetobacteraceae and were less diverse in polar than in temperate populations. The two polar populations were also more similar to each other than either was to the temperate populations, suggesting that environmental conditions help shape the lichen's bacterial associates.
