= Coniothyrium wernsdorffiae =

Scientific classification
- Domain: Eukaryota
- Kingdom: Fungi
- Division: Ascomycota
- Class: Dothideomycetes
- Order: Pleosporales
- Family: Coniothyriaceae
- Genus: Coniothyrium
- Species: C. wernsdorffiae

Binomial name
- Coniothyrium wernsdorffiae Laubert, (1905)

Synonyms
- Coniothyrium cystotricha (Schulzer) Sacc. & Traverso, (1910); Sacidium cystotricha Schulzer, (1871)

Species of fungus

Coniothyrium wernsdorffiae is a plant pathogen that causes brand canker on rose. It can also be hosted by raspberry and brambleberry plants.
