= Hadrospora =

Scientific classification
- Kingdom: Fungi
- Division: Ascomycota
- Class: Dothideomycetes
- Order: Pleosporales
- Family: Phaeosphaeriaceae
- Genus: Hadrospora; Boise

Type species
- Hadrospora fallax (Mouton) Boise

Genus of fungi

Hadrospora is a genus of fungi in the family Phaeosphaeriaceae.
