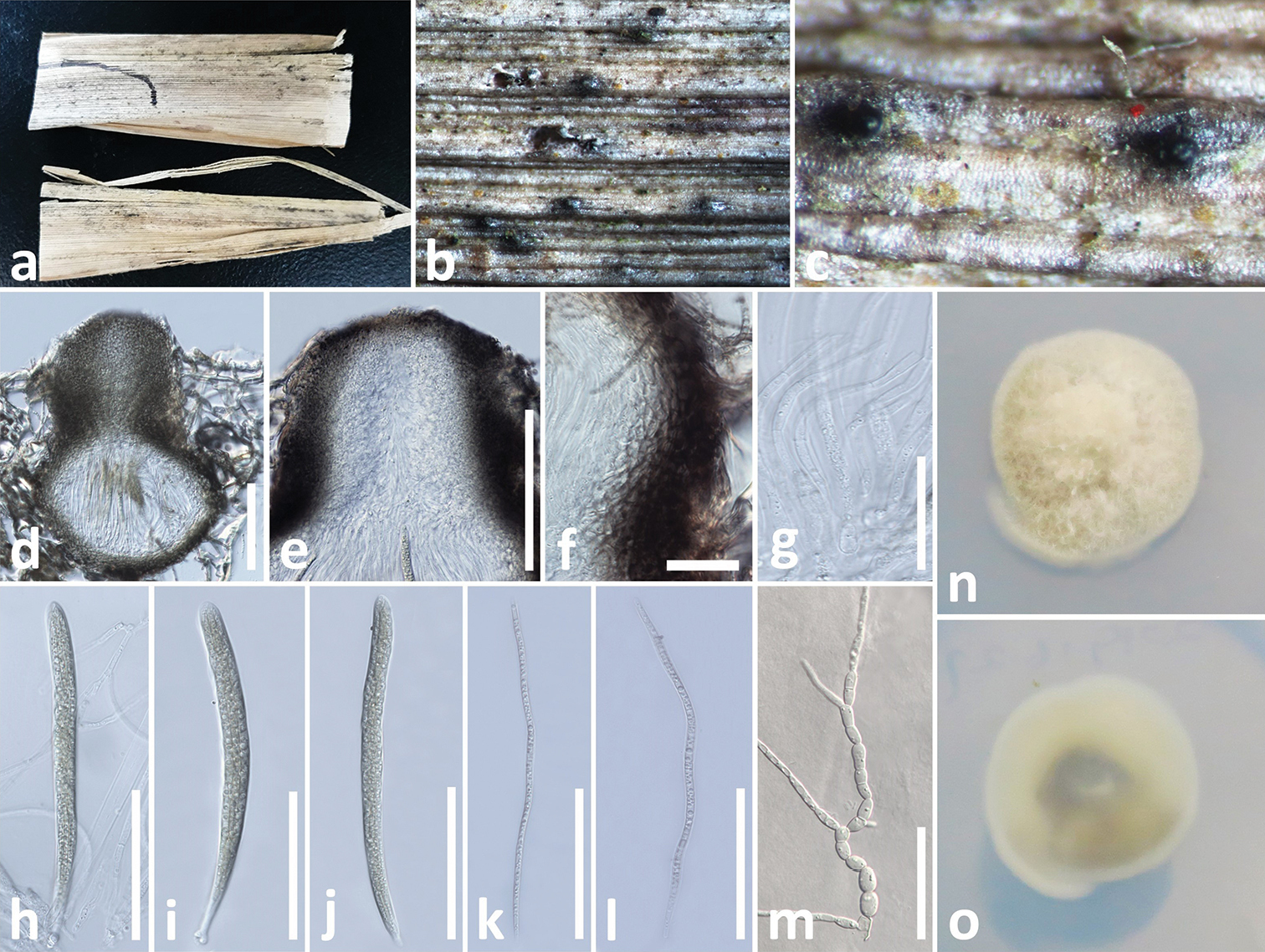
- Ophiosphaerella taiwanensis

Scientific classification
- Kingdom: Fungi
- Division: Ascomycota
- Class: Dothideomycetes
- Order: Pleosporales
- Family: Phaeosphaeriaceae
- Genus: Ophiosphaerella; Speg. (1909)

Type species
- Ophiosphaerella graminicola Speg. (1909)

Species
- See text

= Ophiosphaerella =

Genus of fungi

Ophiosphaerella is a genus of fungi in the family Phaeosphaeriaceae. The genus was described by Italian-Argentinian botanist and mycologist Carlos Luigi Spegazzini in 1909.

Several species are pathogens of turfgrass, causing darkly pigmented hyphae on roots known as "dead spot". Ophiosphaerella korrae, Ophiosphaerella narmari, and Ophiosphaerella herpotricha affect bermudagrass (Cynodon species), while the latter fungus also causes dead spot in buffalo grass (Bouteloua dactyloides). Ophiosphaerella korrae is a cause of necrotic ring spot in creeping red fescue (Festuca rubra).

== Species ==
As accepted by Species Fungorum;

- Ophiosphaerella agrostidis Dern., M.P.S. Câmara, N.R. O'Neill, Berkum & M.E. Palm (2000)
- Ophiosphaerella aquatica Z.L. Luo, Hong Y. Su & K.D. Hyde (2015)
- Ophiosphaerella chiangraiensis Phookamsak & K.D. Hyde (2020)
- Ophiosphaerella erikssonii J. Walker (1980)
- Ophiosphaerella eupatorii J.M. Yen (1969)
- Ophiosphaerella graminicola Speg. (1909)
- Ophiosphaerella herpotricha (Fr.) J. Walker (1980)
- Ophiosphaerella korrae (J. Walker & A.M. Sm. bis) Shoemaker & C.E. Babc. (1989)
- Ophiosphaerella leptosperma (Speg.) J. Walker (1980)
- Ophiosphaerella narmari (J. Walker & A.M. Sm. bis) H.C. Wetzel, Hulbert & Tisserat (1999)
- Ophiosphaerella taiwanensis Tennakoon, C.H. Kuo & K.D. Hyde (2020)
- Ophiosphaerella taiwanica Ariyawansa & E.B.G. Jones (2019)

Former species;

- O. sasicola (Nagas. & Y. Otani) Shoemaker & C.E. Babc. (1989) = Neoophiosphaerella sasicola, Lentitheciaceae
- O. stipae (Hansf.) J. Walker (1980) = Linocarpon stipae, Linocarpaceae
- O. williamsii (Hansf.) J. Walker (1980) = Linocarpon williamsii, Linocarpaceae
