= Coniothyrium henriquesii =

Scientific classification
- Kingdom: Fungi
- Division: Ascomycota
- Class: Dothideomycetes
- Order: Pleosporales
- Family: Coniothyriaceae
- Genus: Coniothyrium
- Species: C. henriquesii

Binomial name
- Coniothyrium henriquesii Thüm.

Synonyms
- Clisosporium henriquesii (Thüm.) Kuntze, Revis. gen. pl. (Leipzig) 3(3): 458 (1898)

Species of fungus

Coniothyrium henriquesii is a fungal plant pathogen.
