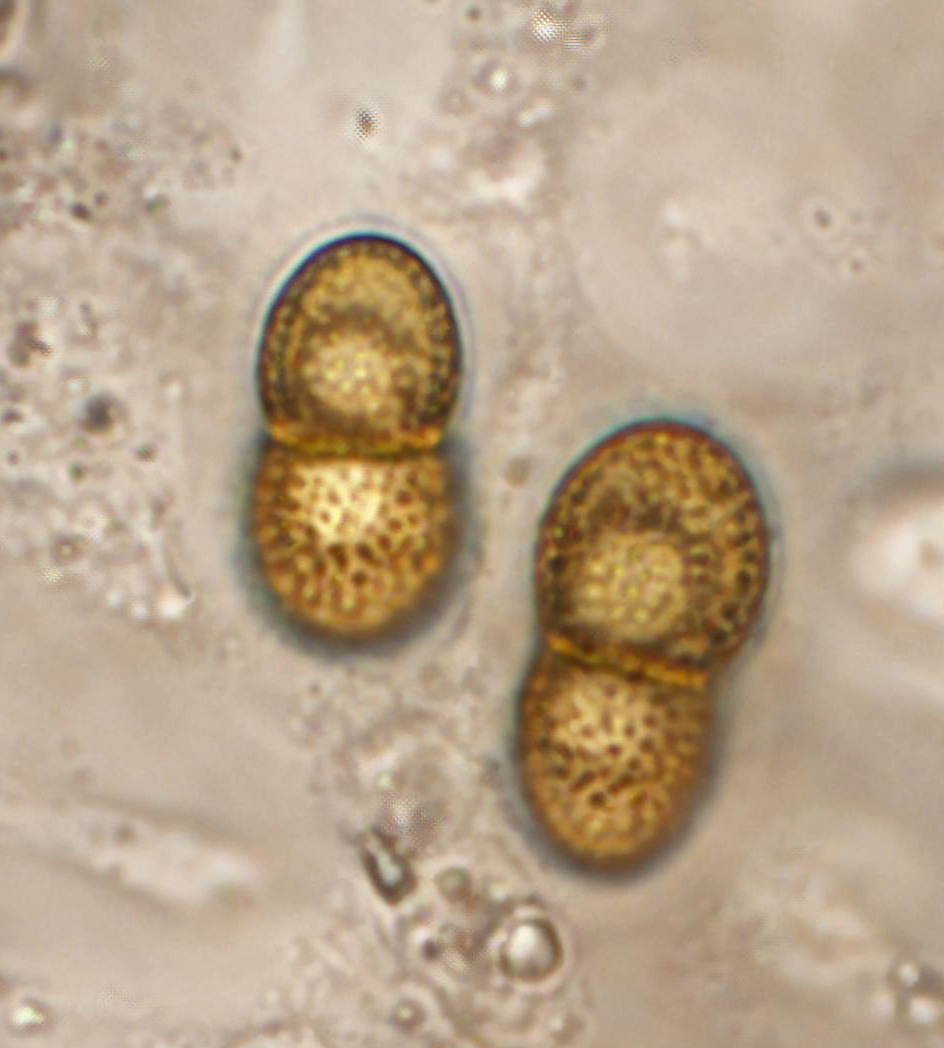
- Didymocyrtis slaptoniensis

Scientific classification
- Kingdom: Fungi
- Division: Ascomycota
- Class: Dothideomycetes
- Order: Pleosporales
- Family: Phaeosphaeriaceae
- Genus: Didymocyrtis; Vain. (1921)

Type species
- Didymocyrtis consimilis Vain. (1921)

Species
- See text

= Didymocyrtis (fungus) =

Genus of fungi

Didymocyrtis is also a zoological genus of spumellarian Radiolaria.

Didymocyrtis is a genus of lichenicolous fungi in the family Phaeosphaeriaceae. The genus was circumscribed by Finnish lichenologist Edvard August Vainio in 1921, with Didymocyrtis consimilis assigned as the type species.

== Species ==
- Didymocyrtis assimilis Vain. (1921)
- Didymocyrtis azorica Etayo & Pino-Bodas (2021)
- Didymocyrtis banksiae Crous & P.A.Barber (2017)
- Didymocyrtis brachylaenae Crous (2018)
- Didymocyrtis bryonthae (Arnold) Hafellner (2015)
- Didymocyrtis canariensis van den Boom & P.Clerc (2017)
- Didymocyrtis cladoniicola (Diederich, Kocourk. & Etayo) Ertz & Diederich (2015)
- Didymocyrtis consimilis Vain. (1921)
- Didymocyrtis epiphyscia Ertz & Diederich (2015)
- Didymocyrtis foliaceiphila (Diederich, Kocourk. & Etayo) Ertz & Diederich (2015)
- Didymocyrtis graphidacearum van den Boom & Ertz (2017)
- Didymocyrtis grumantiana (Zhurb. & Diederich) Zhurb. & Diederich (2018)
- Didymocyrtis infestans (Speg.) Hafellner (2015)
- Didymocyrtis kaernefeltii (S.Y.Kondr.) Hafellner (2015)
- Didymocyrtis melanelixiae (Brackel) Diederich, R.C.Harris & Etayo (2015)
- Didymocyrtis micropunctum Etayo (2017)
- Didymocyrtis microxanthoriae Poumarat, Delhoume, Diederich & Suija (2021)
- Didymocyrtis peltigerae (Fuckel) Hafellner (2019)
- Didymocyrtis physciae (Brackel) Hafellner (2015)
- Didymocyrtis pini P.Monteiro & M.Gonçalves (2021)
- Didymocyrtis pseudeverniae (Etayo & Diederich) Ertz & Diederich (2015)
- Didymocyrtis ramalinae (Roberge ex Desm.) Ertz, Diederich & Hafellner (2015)
- Didymocyrtis rhizoplacae Y.Joshi & K.Bisht (2018)
- Didymocyrtis septata K.Das, S.Y.Lee & H.Y.Jung (2020)
- Didymocyrtis slaptonensis (D.Hawksw.) Hafellner & Ertz (2015)
- Didymocyrtis thamnoliicola Y.Joshi, R.Bajpai & Upreti (2016)
- Didymocyrtis trassii Suija, Darmostuk & Khodos. (2018)
- Didymocyrtis xanthomendozae (Diederich & Freebury) Diederich & Freebury (2015)
