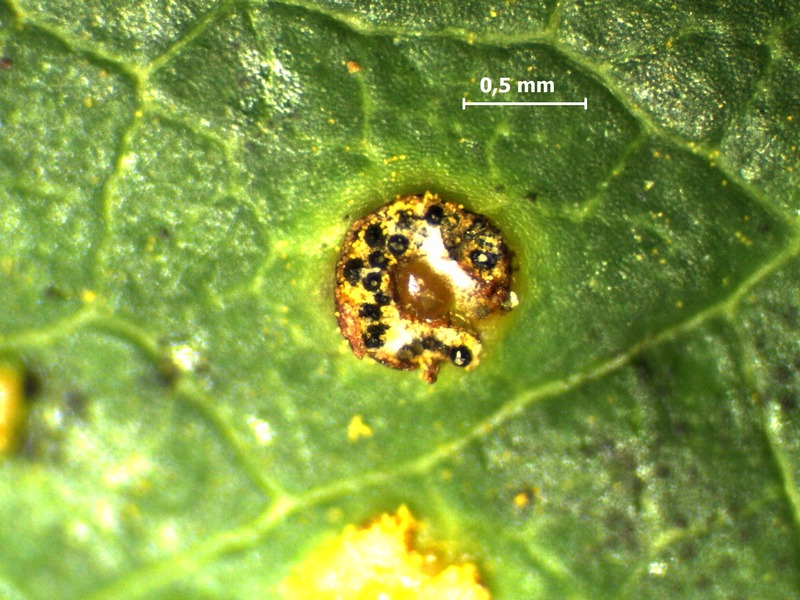
- Eudarluca caricis

Scientific classification
- Domain: Eukaryota
- Kingdom: Fungi
- Division: Ascomycota
- Class: Dothideomycetes
- Order: Pleosporales
- Family: Phaeosphaeriaceae
- Genus: Eudarluca; Speg.

Type species
- Eudarluca australis Speg.

= Eudarluca =

Genus of fungi

Eudarluca is a genus of fungi in the family Phaeosphaeriaceae. The genus was circumscribed by Italian-born Argentinian botanist and mycologist Carlo Luigi Spegazzini in 1908, with Eudarluca australis assigned as the type species.

== Species ==
As accepted by Species Fungorum;

- Eudarluca australis Speg. (1908)
- Eudarluca biconica Katum. (1986)
- Eudarluca brenesii (Petr.) E. Müll. (1962)
- Eudarluca caricis (Fr.) O.E. Erikss. (1966)
- Eudarluca connata (Syd.) Arx (1962)
- Eudarluca indica T.S. Ramakr. (1951)
- Eudarluca mycophila (Petr.) Arx (1962)
- Eudarluca quinqueseptata Katum. (1986)
- Eudarluca venezuelana Syd. (1930)

Former species; E. caricis var. indica (T.S. Ramakr.) O.E. Erikss. (1967) = Eudarluca indica
