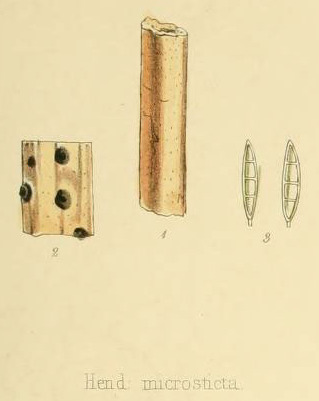
- Hendersonia microsticta

Scientific classification
- Domain: Eukaryota
- Kingdom: Fungi
- Division: Ascomycota
- Class: Dothideomycetes
- Order: Pleosporales
- Family: Phaeosphaeriaceae
- Genus: Hendersonia; Sacc., 1884

= Hendersonia (fungus) =

Genus of fungi

Hendersonia is a genus of fungi belonging to the family Phaeosphaeriaceae.

The genus name of Hendersonia is in honour of Edward George Henderson (1782–1876), who was an English gardener and botanist.

The genus was circumscribed by Pier Andrea Saccardo in Syll. Fung. vol.3 on page 418 in 1884 and Ann. Mag. Nat. Hist. vol.6 on page 430 in 1841.

== Species ==
Species:

- Hendersonia aberrans
- Hendersonia abietis
- Hendersonia abnormalis
