= Nodulosphaeria =

Scientific classification
- Kingdom: Fungi
- Division: Ascomycota
- Class: Dothideomycetes
- Order: Pleosporales
- Family: Phaeosphaeriaceae
- Genus: Nodulosphaeria; Rabenh.

Type species
- Nodulosphaeria hirta Rabenh.

Species
- See text

Genus of fungi

Nodulosphaeria is a genus of fungi in the family Phaeosphaeriaceae.

== Species ==
As accepted by Species Fungorum;

- Nodulosphaeria aconiti Mapook, Camporesi & K.D. Hyde (2016)
- Nodulosphaeria aquilana (D. Sacc.) L. Holm (1957)
- Nodulosphaeria aquilegiae Chaiwan, Camporesi & K.D. Hyde (2019)
- Nodulosphaeria araucariae I. Hino & Katum. (1966)
- Nodulosphaeria aucta (Niessl) L. Holm (1961)
- Nodulosphaeria cadubriae (Speg.) L. Holm (1961)
- Nodulosphaeria centaureae (E. Müll.) L. Holm (1957)
- Nodulosphaeria cirsii (P. Karst.) L. Holm (1957)
- Nodulosphaeria concinna (Ellis & Everh.) Huhndorf (1996)
- Nodulosphaeria deutziae E. Müll. (1959)
- Nodulosphaeria digitalis W.J. Li, Camporesi, Bhat & K.D. Hyde (2015)
- Nodulosphaeria dolioloides Auersw. (1863)
- Nodulosphaeria edgarii Shoemaker & C.E. Babc. (1990)
- Nodulosphaeria franconica (Petr.) L. Holm (1957)
- Nodulosphaeria galiorum Höhn. (1919)
- Nodulosphaeria gallica L. Holm (1961)
- Nodulosphaeria guttulata Tibpromma, Camporesi & K.D. Hyde (2017)
- Nodulosphaeria hirta Rabenh. (1858)
- Nodulosphaeria indica Kulk. (1971)
- Nodulosphaeria italica Phook., Camporesi & K.D. Hyde (2016)
- Nodulosphaeria jaceae (L. Holm) L. Holm (1957)
- Nodulosphaeria kuemmerlei Moesz (1926)
- Nodulosphaeria mertensiae (Ellis) Huhndorf (1996)
- Nodulosphaeria monticola (Ellis & Everh.) Huhndorf (1996)
- Nodulosphaeria morthieriana (Sacc.) Shoemaker & C.E. Babc. (1987)
- Nodulosphaeria muelleri L. Holm (1961)
- Nodulosphaeria multiseptata Tibpromma, Camporesi & K.D. Hyde (2017)
- Nodulosphaeria nipponica Otani & Mikawa (1971)
- Nodulosphaeria novae-angliae M.E. Barr (1992)
- Nodulosphaeria ocimicola (Naphade) A. Pande (2008)
- Nodulosphaeria octoseptata (Wehm.) L. Holm (1957)
- Nodulosphaeria olivacea (Ellis) L. Holm (1961)
- Nodulosphaeria pontica (Petr.) L. Holm (1957)
- Nodulosphaeria pseudaffinis (Petr.) L. Holm (1961)
- Nodulosphaeria revelstokensis Shoemaker (1985)
- Nodulosphaeria rosae I. Hino & Katum. (1968)
- Nodulosphaeria rupestris (E. Müll.) Crivelli (1983)
- Nodulosphaeria sambuci Tibpromma, Camporesi & K.D. Hyde (2017)
- Nodulosphaeria scabiosae Mapook, Camporesi & K.D. Hyde (2016)
- Nodulosphaeria senecionis Chethana, Camporesi, E.B.G. Jones & K.D. Hyde (2015)
- Nodulosphaeria setosa E. Müll. & S. Ahmad (1958)
- Nodulosphaeria spectabilis (Niessl) L. Holm (1961)
- Nodulosphaeria submodesta (E. Müll.) L. Holm (1961)
- Nodulosphaeria succisae Munk (1958)
- Nodulosphaeria thalictri D. Pem, Camporesi & K.D. Hyde (2019)
- Nodulosphaeria valesiaca L. Holm & E. Müll. (1963)
- Nodulosphaeria volkartii (E. Müll.) L. Holm & E. Müll. (1961)

Former species;

- N. asteris-alpini (Gonz. Frag.) Checa (1997) = Sigarispora caulium, Lophiostomataceae
- N. chochrjakovii Lar.N. Vassiljeva (1979) = Leptosphaeria chochrjakovii, Leptosphaeriaceae
- N. cibostii (De Not.) Rabenh. (1858) = Leptosphaeria modesta, Leptosphaeriaceae
- N. culmifraga (Fr.) Petr. (1921) = Leptosphaeria culmifraga, Leptosphaeriaceae
- N. culmorum (Auersw.) Moesz (1926) = Phaeosphaeria culmorum, Phaeosphaeriaceae
- N. derasa (Berk. & Broome) L. Holm (1957) = Leptosphaeria derasa, Leptosphaeriaceae
- N. engadinensis (E. Müll.) Shoemaker & C.E. Babc. (1987) = Wettsteinina engadinensis, Dothideomycetes
- N. epicalamia (Riess) Moesz (1926) = Phaeosphaeria epicalamia, Phaeosphaeriaceae
- N. epilobii (E. Müll.) L. Holm (1957) = Leptosphaeria epilobii, Leptosphaeriaceae
- N. erythrospora (Riess) L. Holm (1957) = Pseudoophiobolus erythrosporus, Phaeosphaeriaceae
- N. fruticum (Roberge ex Desm.) L. Holm (1957) = Ophiobolus fruticum, Phaeosphaeriaceae
- N. galiorum f. lactucae (Rehm) Höhn. (1919) = Kalmusia lactucae, Didymosphaeriaceae
- N. haematites (Roberge ex Desm.) Petr. (1921) = Leptosphaeria haematites, Leptosphaeriaceae
- N. holmii Lar.N. Vassiljeva (1979) = Leptosphaeria macromodesta, Leptosphaeriaceae
- N. ladina (E. Müll.) L. Holm (1957) = Leptosphaeria ladina, Leptosphaeriaceae
- N. macrospora Morthier (1879) = Paraleptosphaeria macrospora, Leptosphaeriaceae
- N. mathieui (Westend.) L. Holm (1957) = Pseudoophiobolus mathieui, Phaeosphaeriaceae
- N. megalospora (Auersw. & Niessl) L. Holm (1961) = Ophiobolus megalosporus, Phaeosphaeriaceae
- N. modesta (Rabenh.) Munk ex L. Holm (1957) = Leptosphaeria modesta, Leptosphaeriaceae
- N. niesslii (Bäumler) L. Holm (1957) = Ophiobolus niesslii, Phaeosphaeriaceae
- N. pellita (Fr.) Shoemaker (1968) = Pyrenophora pellita, Pleosporaceae
- N. pileata (Volkart) Crivelli (1983) = Pleospora pileata, Pleosporaceae
- N. robusta (Strasser) L. Holm (1957) = Leptosphaeria robusta, Leptosphaeriaceae
- N. septemcellulata (E. Müll.) L. Holm (1957) = Leptosphaeria septemcellulata, Leptosphaeriaceae
- N. ulnospora (Cooke) L. Holm (1957) = Ophiobolus ulnosporus, Phaeosphaeriaceae
- N. winteri (Niessl) Crivelli (1983) = Wettsteinina winteri, Dothideomycetes
