= Daphne mucronata =

Scientific classification
- Kingdom: Plantae
- Clade: Tracheophytes
- Clade: Angiosperms
- Clade: Eudicots
- Clade: Rosids
- Order: Malvales
- Family: Thymelaeaceae
- Genus: Daphne
- Species: D. mucronata

Binomial name
- Daphne mucronata Royle

Synonyms
- Daphne angustifolia var. mucronata (Royle) Keissl.

Species of shrub

Daphne mucronata is a shrub, of the family Thymelaeaceae. It is native to western Asia, ranging from eastern Turkey to the Arabian Peninsula, Iran, Afghanistan, Pakistan, and the western Himalayas.

== Description ==
The shrub is evergreen, and grows to 2.5 m tall. Its slender branches are pale green. It is often found near river banks at around 800–3000 m elevation.

The leaves contain poisonous properties that are not potent towards goats and the bark can be used to heal bone diseases and for washing hair. The fruits it bears are edible and can be used as a dye.

Plant pathogen fungal species Coniothyrium ferrarisianum has been isolated from leaves of Daphne mucronata Royle in Iran.

== Subspecies ==
Three subspecies are accepted:

- Daphne mucronata subsp. linearifolia (Hart) Halda – Syria to Saudi Arabia
- Daphne mucronata subsp. mucronata – southwestern Turkey, Transcaucasus, Iraq, Saudi Arabia, Oman, Iran, Afghanistan, Pakistan, and the western Himalayas
- Daphne mucronata subsp. turcica Halda – eastern Turkey, northern Iraq, and western Iran
