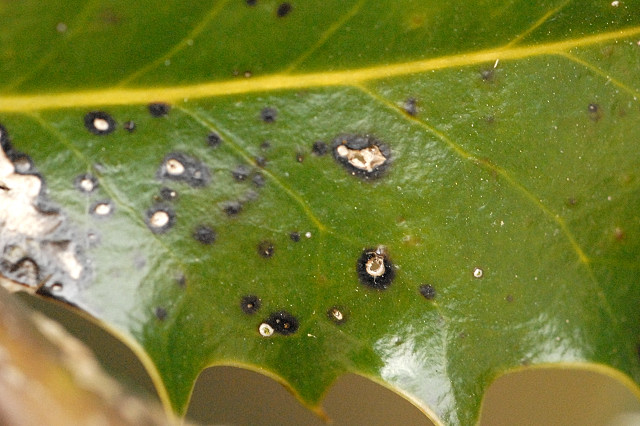
- Species Coniothyrium ilicis on a holly leaf from Commanster in Belgium

Scientific classification
- Kingdom: Fungi
- Division: Ascomycota
- Class: Dothideomycetes
- Order: Pleosporales
- Family: Coniothyriaceae; W.B. Cooke, Revta Biol., Lisb. 12: 289 (1983)

Type genus
- Coniothyrium Corda (1840)

= Coniothyriaceae =

Family of fungi

Coniothyriaceae is a family of ascomycetous marine-based fungi within the order of Pleosporales in the subclass Pleosporomycetidae and within the class Dothideomycetes. They are pathogenic (Necrotrophic (feeding on the dead tissues of plants they have killed) or causing leaf spot) or they can be saprobic on dead branches. They are generally a anamorphic species (having an asexual reproductive stage).

== Genera ==
According to Outline of Fungi and fungus-like taxa – 2021;

- Coniothyrium Corda (1840) (about 450 species, see List of Coniothyrium species)
- Foliophoma Crous (2017) (2)
- Neoconiothyrium Crous (2017) (4)
- Ochrocladosporium Crous & U. Braun (2007) (3)
- Staurosphaeria Rabenh. (1858) (5)

== History ==
The family was introduced in 1983 to accommodate genus Coniothyrium spp. By 1986, W.B. Cooke had placed the family in Blastopycnidineae suborder.

Later Coniothyriaceae was synonymized to family Leptosphaeriaceae by Kirk et al. (2008). Coniothyriaceae was then reinstated in order Pleosporales as de Gruyter et al. (2013) revealed the distinct phylogenetic relationship between Coniothyrium palmarum and family Leptosphaeriaceae. This was based on LSU and ITS sequence data and revealed that Coniothyrium palmarum was phylogenetically distant from family Leptosphaeriaceae. Further de Gruyter et al. (2013) transferred some Phoma spp. to Coniothyrium as they claded in the Coniothyriaceae family. Also Coniothyrium minitans and Coniothyrium sporulosum claded in former family Montagnulaceae, the two species were then included in the new genus Paraconiothyrium by Verkley et al. (2004b). Both were later placed in the Paraphaeosphaeria genus, as Paraphaeosphaeria minitans and Paraphaeosphaeria sporulosa respectively, both within the Didymosphaeriaceae family. Cortinas et al. (2004) showed that Coniothyrium zuluense was accommodated in family Mycosphaerellaceae. Cortinas et al. (2006), and Crous et al. (2009b) suggested that C. zuluense is well-accommodated in genus Colletogloeopsis (family Phaeosphaeriaceae). Quaedvlieg et al. (2014) reported Colletogloeopsis under family Teratosphaeriaceae. On Species Fungorum, Colletogloeopsis zuluensis (M.J. Wingf., Crous & T.A. Cout.) M.-N. Cortinas, M.J. Wingf. & Crous (2006) is a synonym of Teratosphaeria zuluensis. Both genus Coniothyrium and coniothyrium-like species were identified as polyphyletic within the Pleosporales order.

In 2021, while attempting to sort out the DNA evaluation of the fungus Bipolaris sorokiniana, strains of the fungus were isolated from wheat roots and leaves in China. Using protein-coding genes it confirmed the placement of Coniothyriaceae within order Pleosporales.

Wijayawardene et al. 2022 then placed the genus Hazslinszkyomyces Crous & R.K. Schumach. within the genus of Staurosphaeria. This is supported by phylogenetic analysis.

In 2023, Wijes., M.S. Calabon, E.B.G. Jones & K.D. Hyde added new genus Coniothyrioides (with one species Coniothyrioides thailandica) into the Coniothyriaceae family based on fresh fungal collection from salt marsh habitats in Thailand. This has not yet been verified by other authors.

== Description ==
Genera and species within the Coniothyriaceae family have; an asexual morph which is characterized in having cucurbitaria-like, black and globose shaped ascomata (fruiting body). It is sometimes scattered beneath the host periderm (bark) or on decorticated (debarked) wood. They have a short central ostiole (small hole or opening), which is circular and sometimes papillate (covered in small hairs). The conidiophores are reduced to conidiogenous cells lining the inner cavity.

The peridium (outer layer) is dark brown, 'textura angularis' (a parenchyma-like tissue of very densely packed cells that appear angular in cross section), with thick-walled cells. The hamathecium (i.e., all of the fungal hyphae or other tissues between asci) is branched, septate (divided into partitions) and it has cellular pseudoparaphyses (interascal hypha derived from an ascohymenial development). The asci is 8-spored, cylindrical, bitunicate (double walled) and muriform (divided in regular chambers). The ellipsoidal shaped ascospores are initially hyaline (glass-like/transparent) and brown at maturity. They are slightly paler, conical and narrow at the ends. Conidial morphology is varied between genera as macroconidia and microconidia.

== Distribution ==
The Coniothyriaceae have a cosmopolitan distribution across the world, except parts of Canada and Russia. This includes places such as Andalusia (Spain), Iran, China, and Thailand.

For example of widespread distribution; species Coniothyrium ferrarisianum has been isolated from leaves of Daphne mucronata Royle in Iran, it was originally isolated from Acer pseudoplatanus L. in Italy in 1958, and it was later found on Vitis vinifera L. in Canada in 2017, as well as Prunus spp. in Germany in 2020, and also from Olea europaea L. in South Africa in 2020.
