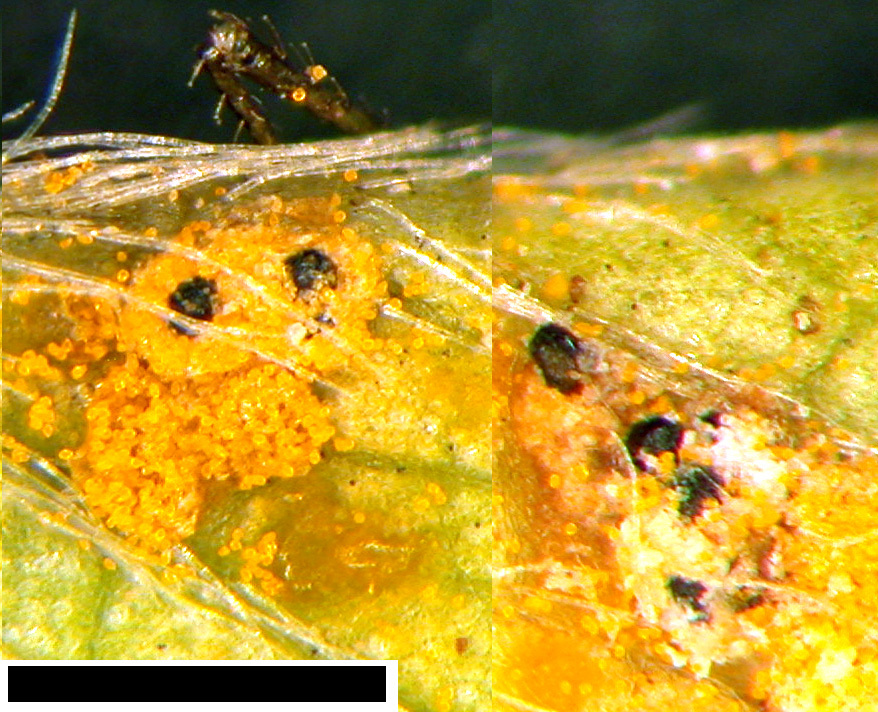
- Eudarluca caricis

Scientific classification
- Kingdom: Fungi
- Division: Ascomycota
- Class: Dothideomycetes
- Order: Pleosporales
- Family: Phaeosphaeriaceae; M.E.Barr (1979)

Type genus
- Phaeosphaeria I.Miyake (1909)

= Phaeosphaeriaceae =

Family of fungi

The Phaeosphaeriaceae are a family of fungi in the order Pleosporales. Species in the family have a cosmopolitan distribution, and are generally necrotrophic or saprobic on a wide range of plants.

Wijayawardene et al. 2020 produced an update that recognized 82 genera.

== Genera list ==
As accepted by Wijayawardene et al. 2020; (with amounts of species)

- Acericola Wanas., Camporesi, E.B.G. Jones & K.D. Hyde (1)
- Allophaeosphaeria Ariyaw., Camporesi & K.D. Hyde (3)
- Amarenographium O.E. Erikss. (4)
- Amarenomyces O.E. Erikss. (2)
- Ampelomyces Ces. ex Schltdl. (ca. 5)
- Aphanostigme Syd. (21)
- Arezzomyces Y. Marín & Crous (1)
- Banksiophoma Crous (1)
- Bhagirathimyces S.M. Singh & S.K. Singh (1)
- Bhatiellae Wanas., Camporesi & K.D. Hyde (1)
- Bricookea M.E. Barr (1)
- Brunneomurispora Phook., Wanas. & K.D. Hyde (1)
- Camarosporioides W.J. Li & K.D. Hyde (1)
- Chaetosphaeronema Moesz (12)
- Dactylidina Wanas., Camporesi & K.D. Hyde (2)
- Dematiopleospora Wanas., Camporesi, E.B.G. Jones & K.D. Hyde (8)
- Didymocyrtis Vain. (21)
- Dlhawksworthia Wanas., Camporesi & K.D. Hyde (3)
- Edenia M.C. González, A.L. Anaya, Glenn, Saucedo & Hanlin (2)
- Embarria Wanas., Camporesi & K.D. Hyde (1)
- Equiseticola Abdelsalam, Tibpromma, Wanas. & K.D. Hyde (1)
- Eudarluca Speg. (8)
- Galiicola Tibpromma, Camporesi & K.D. Hyde (3)
- Hydeomyces Maharachch., H.A. Ariyaw., Wanas. & Al-Sadi (2)
- Hydeopsis J.F. Zhang, J.K. Liu & Z.Y. Liu (1)
- Italica Wanas., Camporesi & K.D. Hyde (2)
- Jeremyomyces Crous & R.K. Schumach. (1)
- Juncaceicola Tennakoon, Camporesi, Phook. & K.D. Hyde (8)
- Kwanghwana A. Karunarathna, C. H. Kuo & K. D. Hyde (1)
- Leptospora Rabenh. (15)
- Longispora Phukhams. & K.D. Hyde (1)
- Loratospora Kohlm. & Volkm.-Kohlm. (2)
- Mauginiella Cavara (1)
- Melnikia Wijayaw., Goonas., Bhat & K.D. Hyde (1)
- Murichromolaenicola Mapook & K.D. Hyde (2)
- Muriphaeosphaeria Phukhams., Bulgakov & K.D. Hyde (3)
- Neoophiobolus Mapook & K.D. Hyde (1)
- Neosetophoma Gruyter, Aveskamp & Verkley (15)
- Neosphaerellopsis Crous & Trakun. (10)
- Neostagonospora Quaedvl., Verkley & Crous (6)
- Neostagonosporella C.L. Yang, X.L. Xu & K.D. Hyde (1)
- Neosulcatispora Crous & M.J. Wingf. (2)
- Nodulosphaeria Rabenh. (ca. 52)
- Ophiobolopsis Phook., Wanas. & K.D. Hyde (1)
- Ophiobolus Riess (350)
- Ophiosimulans Tibpromma, Camporesi & K.D. Hyde (1)
- Ophiosphaerella Speg. (10)
- Paraleptospora Mapook & K.D. Hyde (2)
- Paraloratospora Bundhun, Tennakoon, Phookamsak & K.D. Hyde (2)
- Paraophiobolus Phook., Wanas. & K.D. Hyde (2)
- Paraphoma Morgan-Jones & J.F. White (8)
- Parastagonospora Quaedvl., Verkley & Crous (ca. 19)
- Parastagonosporella M. Bakhshi, Arzanlou & Crous (1)
- Phaeopoacea Thambug., Dissan. & K.D. Hyde (3)
- Phaeoseptoriella Crous (1)
- Phaeosphaeria I. Miyake (ca. 95)
- Phaeosphaeriopsis M.P.S. Câmara, M.E. Palm & A.W. Ramaley (12)
- Phaeostagonospora A.W. Ramaley (1)
- Piniphoma Crous & R.K. Schumach. (1)
- Poaceicola W.J. Li, Camporesi, Bhat & K.D. Hyde (10)
- Populocrescentia Wanas., E.B.G. Jones & K.D. Hyde (3)
- Pseudoophiobolus Phook., Wanas. & K.D. Hyde (8)
- Pseudoophiosphaerella J.F. Zhang, J.K. Liu & Z.Y. Liu (1)
- Pseudophaeosphaeria Jayasiri, Camporesi & K.D. Hyde (1)
- Pseudostaurosphaeria Mapook & K.D. Hyde (2)
- Sclerostagonospora Höhn. (ca. 15)
- Scolicosporium Lib. ex Roum. (13)
- Septoriella Oudem. (includes Wojnowicia Sacc.)) (22)
- Setomelanomma M. Morelet (1)
- Setophoma Gruyter, Aveskamp & Verkley (6)
- Sulcispora Shoemaker & C.E. Babc. (2)
- Tiarospora Sacc. & Marchal (3)
- Tintelnotia S.A. Ahmed, Hofmüller, M. Seibold & de Hoog (2)
- Vagicola K.W.T. Chethana & K.D. Hyde (1)
- Vittaliana Devadatha, Nikita, A. Baghela & V.V. Sarma (1)
- Vrystaatia Quaedvl., W.J. Swart, Verkley & Crous (1)
- Wingfieldomyces Y. Marín & Crous (1)
- Wojnowiciella Crous, Hern.-Restr. & M.J. Wingf. (9)
- Xenophaeosphaeria Crous & M.J. Wingf. (1)
- Xenophoma Crous & Trakunyingcharoen (1)
- Xenoseptoria Quaedvl., H.D. Shin, Verkley & Crous (1)
- Yunnanensis Karun., Phook. & K.D. Hyde (1)

== Bibliography ==
Quaedvlieg, W.; Verkley, G.J.M.; Shin, H.-D.; Barreto, R.W.; Alfenas, A.C.; Swart, W.J.; Groenewald, J.Z.; Crous, P.W. (June 2013). "Sizing up Septoria". Studies in Mycology. 75 (1): 307–390. doi:10.3114/sim0017. PMC 3713890. PMID 24014902.
