= Montagnula =

Scientific classification
- Kingdom: Fungi
- Division: Ascomycota
- Class: Dothideomycetes
- Order: Pleosporales
- Family: Didymosphaeriaceae
- Genus: Montagnula; Berl. (1896)

Type species
- Montagnula infernalis (Niessl) Berl. (1896)

Genus of fungi

Montagnula is a genus of fungi in the family Didymosphaeriaceae. The genus, circumscribed by mycologist Augusto Napoleone Berlese in 1896, contains an estimated 24 species in 2008, but is probably polyphyletic as currently circumscribed. It was originally placed in family Montagnulaceae, before that family was dissolved and it was later placed in family Didymosphaeriaceae, with 34 species (in 2023).

The genus name of Montagnula is in honour of Jean Pierre François Camille Montagne (1784–1866), who was a French military physician and botanist who specialized in the fields of bryology and mycology.

== Species ==
As accepted by Species Fungorum;

- Montagnula aloes Crous (2012)
- Montagnula appendiculata (Aptroot) Wanas., E.B.G. Jones & K.D. Hyde (2017)
- Montagnula aquatica Y.R. Sun, Yong Wang bis & K.D. Hyde (2023)
- Montagnula baatanensis (Petr.) Crivelli (1983)
- Montagnula bellevaliae Wanas., Camporesi, E.B.G. Jones & K.D. Hyde (2015)
- Montagnula camarae (M.T. Lucas) Checa (1998)
- Montagnula camporesii Phukhams., Camporesi & K.D. Hyde (2020)
- Montagnula chiangraiensis Mapook & K.D. Hyde (2020)
- Montagnula chromolaenae Mapook & K.D. Hyde (2020)
- Montagnula cirsii Qing Tian, Camporesi & K.D. Hyde (2016)
- Montagnula cylindrospora Valenz.-Lopez, Cano, Guarro & Stchigel (2020)
- Montagnula dasylirionis A.W. Ramaley & M.E. Barr (1995)
- Montagnula donacina (Niessl) Wanas., E.B.G. Jones & K.D. Hyde (2017)
- Montagnula dura (Niessl) Crivelli (1983)
- Montagnula graminicola Chethana, Thambug., Camporesi & K.D. Hyde (2015)
- Montagnula guiyangensis Y.R. Sun, Yong Wang bis & K.D. Hyde (2023)
- Montagnula infernalis (Niessl) Berl. (1896)
- Montagnula jonesii Tennakoon, Wanas., Phook. & K.D. Hyde (2016)
- Montagnula krabiensis Tibpromma & K.D. Hyde (2018)
- Montagnula longipes (Trab.) Aptroot (1995)
- Montagnula melanorhabdos (Petr.) Aptroot (2006)
- Montagnula mohavensis A.W. Ramaley & M.E. Barr (1995)
- Montagnula obtusa (Fuckel) Crivelli (1983)
- Montagnula opaca (H. Wegelin) Crivelli (1983)
- Montagnula opulenta (De Not.) Aptroot (1995)
- Montagnula opuntiae (B.O. Dodge) Huhndorf (1992)
- Montagnula palmacea (Cooke) Aptroot (1995)
- Montagnula perforans (Roberge ex Desm.) Aptroot (2006)
- Montagnula phragmospora (Durieu & Mont.) Crivelli (1983)
- Montagnula rhodophaea (Bizz.) Leuchtm. (1984)
- Montagnula scabiosae Wanas., Camporesi, E.B.G. Jones & K.D. Hyde (2015)
- Montagnula stromatosa Aptroot, Joanne E. Taylor & K.D. Hyde (1999)
- Montagnula subsuperficialis (Sacc. & P. Syd.) Shoemaker & C.E. Babc. (1989)
- Montagnula thuemeniana (Sacc.) Crivelli (1983)
- Montagnula triseti (E. Müll.) Crivelli (1983)
- Montagnula vakrabeejae M. Niranjan & V.V. Sarma (2018)
- Montagnula yuccigena A.W. Ramaley & M.E. Barr (1995)

Former species;

- M. anthostomoides (Rehm) Leuchtm. (1984) = Paramassariosphaeria anthostomoide, Didymosphaeriaceae
- M. chromolaenicola Mapook & K.D. Hyde (2020) = Montagnula donacina
- M. gilletiana (Sacc.) Crivelli (1983) = Cucurbitaria spartii, Cucurbitariaceae
- M. hirtula (P. Karst.) Leuchtm. (1984) = Chaetomastia hirtula, Teichosporaceae
- M. puerensis Tibpromma & Du (2021) = Montagnula donacina
- M. saikhuensis Wanas., E.B.G. Jones & K.D. Hyde (2016) = Montagnula donacina
- M. spartii (Fabre) Aptroot (1995) = Pseudodidymosphaeria spartii, Massarinaceae
- M. thailandica Mapook & K.D. Hyde (2020) = Montagnula donacina
