= Wilhelm Hofmeister =

German biologist and botanist (1824–1877)

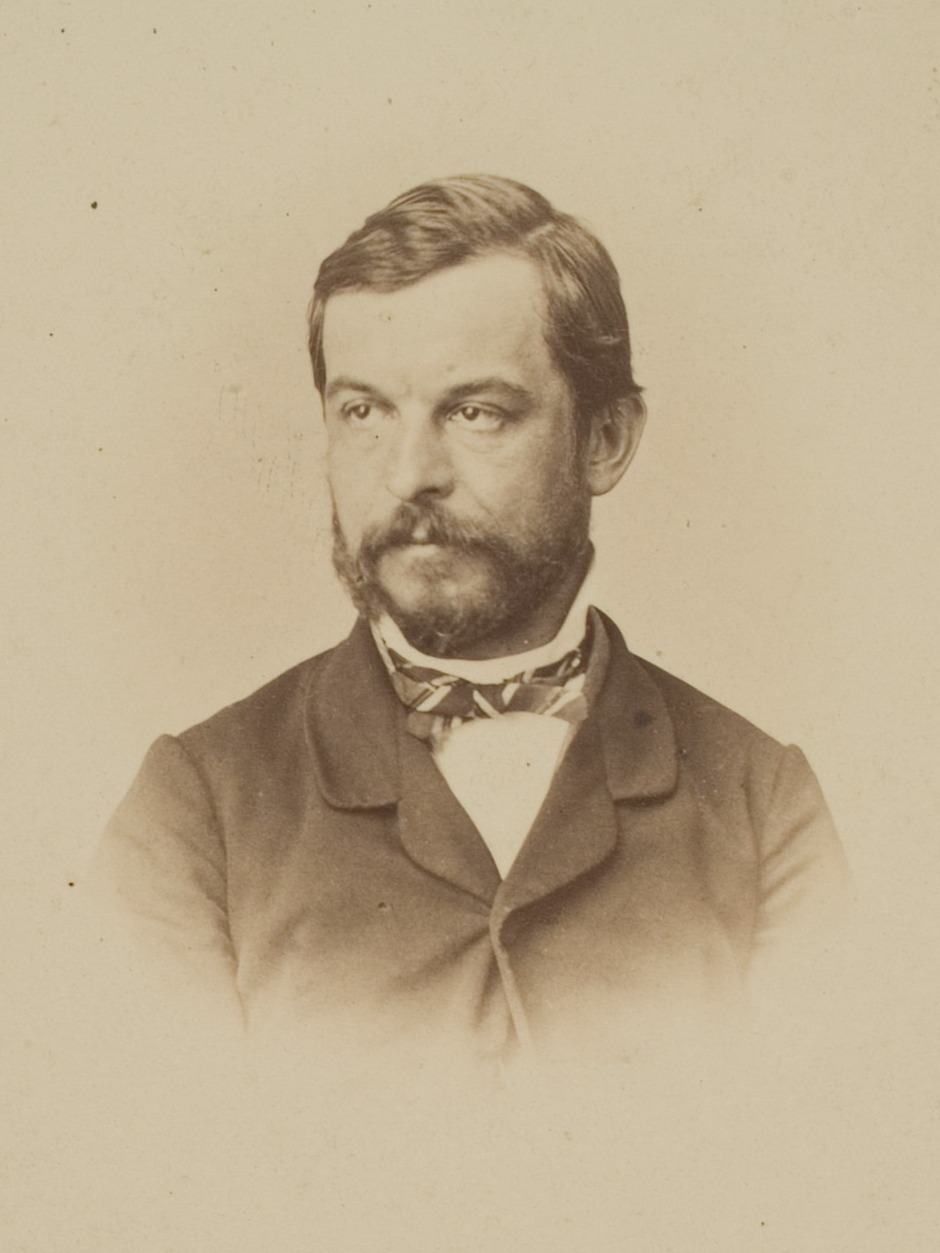
- Born: 18 May 1824; Leipzig, Kingdom of Saxony
- Died: 12 January 1877 (aged 52); Lindenau, German Empire
- Education: none
- Known for: discovering the alternation of generations in plants
- Spouse: 1. Muriel Agnes Lurgenstein (died) 2. Johanna Schmidt
- Children: 9
- Scientific career
- Fields: botany, biology
- Workplaces: University of Heidelberg, University of Tübingen
- Doctoral advisor: none

Wilhelm Friedrich Benedikt Hofmeister (18 May 1824 – 12 January 1877) was a German biologist and botanist. He "stands as one of the true giants in the history of biology and belongs in the same pantheon as Darwin and Mendel." Largely self-taught he was the first to study and establish alternation of generations and the details of sexual reproduction in the bryophytes.

== Biography ==
Hofmeister and his sister Clementine were the children of Friederich and Frederike (née Seidenschnur) Hofmeister. His father was a book and music publisher and seller in Leipzig. He left vocational high school (Realschule) at the age of 15 and was apprenticed in a bookshop in Hamburg by an acquaintance of his father. He met Muriel Agnes Lurgenstein and they married in 1847, subsequently having nine children. That same year, he was initiated freemasonry at Lodge Apollo in Hamburg. She (died 28 March 1870) and seven children pre-deceased him. His second marriage to Johanna Schmidt on 26 February 1876 was short because he died in 1877 following several strokes.

He did most of his research in his free-time, largely from four to six in the morning before going to work. Nevertheless, he was only 27 when he published his ground-breaking monograph on the alternation of generations in plants. He was awarded an honorary doctorate by the University of Rostock in 1851. Not until 1863 was he employed as a Professor, and Director of the Botanic Garden, at the University of Heidelberg. In 1872, he moved to the University of Tübingen.

Hofmeister is widely credited with discovery of alternation of generations as a general principle in plant life. His proposal that alternation between a spore-bearing generation (sporophyte) and a gamete-bearing generation (gametophyte) constituted a unifying theory of plant evolution that was published in 1851. This was crucial in demonstrating that sexual reproduction occurred in plants, which was under extensive debate in the mid-1800s. He showed that products from both the pollen tube and egg were required. This discovery and unifying principle of plant reproduction occurred eight years before Darwin's On the Origin of Species was published. After this book was published, Hofmeister became a leading proponent of Darwinism.

Hofmeister was also an early student of the genetics in plants. He is cited for the first studies of plant embryology. According to C. D. Darlington, Hofmeister had observed what would later be called chromosomes in a dividing cell nucleus as early as 1848. He left detailed sketches which are reproduced in Darlington's The Facts of Life, though he was not the first to observe them. There is good evidence that Gregor Mendel was aware of Hofmeister's work and this was part of his motivation to study plant hybridisation.

His books Die Lehre von der Pflanzenzelle (1867) and Allgemeine Morphologie der Gewächse (1868) were about plant cells and morphology. They contained very detailed descriptions and illustrations from microscopic study of plant cell structure and internal organisation. The cell wall was a particular focus. He observed that plant cells expand and then divide with a new wall laid down in the centre of the cell. During this growth he recorded that the cell walls swell in the direction of growth, corresponding to layers and striations in the wall. He thus identified a fundamental difference between development in plants and animals since animal cells have to migrate as organs develop. His book on plant morphology in 1868 included studies of growth responses to response to environmental stimuli, particularly gravitropism and phototropism. The book also described in detail the apical meristem of plants based on his observations using a microscope, and his insights became known as "Hofmeister's rule", where new primordia develop on the meristem in the largest available space. He also carried out experiments to measure the forces and tensions involved as plant stems bend. Charles Darwin referred to Hofmeister's studies extensively in his own book The Power of Movement in Plants (1880).

In 1869, he was elected a foreign member of the Royal Swedish Academy of Sciences.

Hofmeister's contribution to biology is still far from widely acknowledged. This may partly be attributed to the fact that only one of his works was translated at the time from German to English. However, Kaplan & Cooke conclude that "his reputation became eclipsed because he was so far ahead of his contemporaries that no one could understand or appreciate his work".

== Selected works ==
- "Untersuchungen des Vorgangs bei der Befruchtung der Oenothereen." In: Botanische Zeitung, vol. 5, 1847, cols. 785–792 (= in: No. 45, 5 November 1847).
- Die Entstehung des Embryo der Phanerogamen. Eine Reihe mikroskopischer Untersuchungen. Verlag F. Hofmeister, Leipzig 1849.
- Vergleichende Untersuchungen der Keimung, Entfaltung und Fruchtbildung höherer Kryptogamen (Moose, Farrn, Equisetaceen, Rhizocarpeen und Lycopodiaceen) und der Samenbildung der Coniferen. 179 pp., 1851, (Reprint: Historiae Naturalis Classica 105. Cramer, Vaduz 1979). English translation (by F. Currey): On the germination, development and fructification of the higher Cryptogamia and on the fructification of the Coniferae. Ray Society, London, 1862.
- Neue Beiträge zur Kenntniss der Embryobildung der Phanerogamen. 1. Dikotyledonen mit ursprünglich einzelligem, nur durch Zellentheilung wachsendem Endosperm. S. Hirzel, Leipzig, pp. 536–672. 1859.
- Neue Beiträge zur Kenntniss der Embryobildung der Phanerogamen. 2. Monokotyledonen. S. Hirzel, Leipzig, pp. 632–760. 1861.
- "Die Lehre von der Pflanzenzelle". In: W. Hofmeister (ed.): Handbuch der Physiologischen Botanik I-1. W. Engelmann, Leipzig 1867.
- "Allgemeine Morphologie der Gewächse." In: W. Hofmeister (ed.): Handbuch der Physiologischen Botanik I-2. W. Engelmann, Leipzig 1868.
