= Psammina =

Scientific classification
- Kingdom: Fungi
- Division: Ascomycota
- Subdivision: Pezizomycotina
- Class: incertae sedis
- Order: incertae sedis
- Family: incertae sedis
- Genus: Psammina; Sacc. & M.Rousseau ex E.Bommer & M.Rousseau (1890)

Type species
- Psammina bommerae Sacc. & M.Rousseau (1890)

Species
- See text

Synonyms
- Pycnopsammina Diederich & Etayo (1995)

Genus of fungi

Psammina is a fungal genus in the division Ascomycota. The relationship of this taxon to other taxa within the division is unknown (incertae sedis), and it has not yet been placed with certainty into any class, order, or family. The genus comprises fungi that inhabit various environments, growing on plants, algae, and lichens. These fungi are notable for their unique reproductive structures, which resemble tiny hands or palms when viewed under a microscope. Psammina species play diverse ecological roles: some form partnerships with algae to create lichens, others grow on existing lichens, and some can cause damage to their host organisms. The genus was first proposed in 1890 and currently includes ten recognised species. While Psammina fungi have been found mainly in Europe, with sightings in countries such as the United Kingdom, the Netherlands, and France, at least one species has been reported in Brazil, suggesting a potentially wider distribution.

== Taxonomy ==
The genus was published by Elise Caroline Bommer and Marietta Hannon Rousseau in 1890, based on a description provided by Rousseau and Pier Andrea Saccardo.

The taxonomic placement and boundaries of Psammina have been subject to debate. The genus shares similarities with other fungal genera, particularly Cheiromycina and Pycnopsammina. Cheiromycina, like some Psammina species, produces palmate conidia flattened in a single plane, but differs in having conidia that arise from distinctive subglobose, strongly inflated conidiogenous cells. Pycnopsammina was originally described as separate from Psammina due to its reportedly immersed, ostiolate conidiomata. However, a closer examination of the type species, P. lobariae, revealed conidiogenesis details similar to those of Psammina bommeriae. This led Peter Michael Earland-Bennett and David L. Hawksworth (2005) to propose that Pycnopsammina should be treated as a synonym of Psammina. The variation in conidial development among Psammina species has raised questions about whether the genus should be subdivided.

== Description ==
Psammina is a genus of fungi known for its unique reproductive structures. When visible to the naked eye, Psammina appears as small, scattered dark brown to black spots on its host, each spot measuring about 0.1 to 0.2 millimeters across. These spots may look slightly grainy or almost smooth, depending on the species. The main body of the fungus, the mycelium, grows hidden within the tissue of its host. This mycelium consists of brown, branching threads (hyphae) that are slightly swollen at intervals, giving them a beaded appearance. These hyphae are quite thin, measuring only about 2.5 to 3.5 micrometres (μm) in width.

Unlike many fungi, Psammina does not produce enclosed fruiting bodies. Instead, it forms small, cushion-like structures called sporodochia, from which specialised reproductive cells emerge. These reproductive cells, known as conidiophores, stand upright and are unbranched, smooth-walled, and divided into segments. They typically measure 30 to 50 μm in length and about 3 to 3.5 μm in width. At the tips of these conidiophores, Psammina produces its most distinctive feature: unique spores called conidia. These conidia are dry, pale brown, and remarkably complex in structure. They resemble tiny hands or palms, with multiple arm-like projections radiating outward from a central point. The number of these "arms" can vary greatly between species, ranging from fewer than 20 to over 100 per conidium.

The arms of the conidia show considerable variation among different Psammina species. They can be as short as 10 μm or as long as 80 μm, and their width typically ranges from 2 to 4 μm, though some species have arms up to 6 μm wide. The shape of these arms also varies, with some being straight, others curved, some swollen, and others tapering towards the tip. Each arm is divided into segments by cross-walls, with the number of these divisions differing between species.

When gently flattened under a microscope, a mature Psammina conidium can span from about 50 to over 160 μm in diameter, depending on the species. These intricate conidia are key to identifying different species within the genus Psammina, as their specific characteristics vary from one species to another.

The process of conidium formation (conidiogenesis) in Psammina varies among species, which has implications for the genus's taxonomy. In the type species, P. bommeriae, conidia arise as short lateral branches from the conidiophores. However, in other species, such as P. stipitata and P. palmata, conidia are produced from discrete, elongate, vertical conidiogenous cells. The conidiogenous cells in some species are monoblastic (producing a single conidium), integrated (formed from the same hyphae as the vegetative parts), terminal, and often brown and smooth-walled. In P. palmata, for example, these cells can be markedly swollen below and somewhat eccentrically flask-shaped (ampulliform), measuring 6–10 by 1.5–2.5 μm. This variation in conidiogenesis among Psammina species has led to discussions about potential subdivision of the genus.

== Habitat and distribution ==
Psammina species exhibit a diverse range of ecological roles and habitats. They can be found in various environments, primarily associated with plants, algae, and lichens. The genus includes species that are saprophytic (living on dead organic matter), lichenised (forming a symbiotic relationship with algae to create lichens), lichenicolous (growing on lichens), or algicolous (growing on algae). Psammina palmata was the first lichen-forming fungus identified in the genus. Many Psammina species show a preference for specific microhabitats. They are often found growing on crusts of green algae and lichens that occur on the dry sides of trees and stones. This particular niche seems to be favoured by several species within the genus, including P. stipitata, P. filamentosa, and P. inflata. These species can be observed as small, often somewhat granular black spots on their host organisms.

The ecological roles of Psammina species can vary. Some, like P. filamentosa, have been observed to be pathogenic, causing bleaching of their host algae or lichens. This suggests that certain Psammina species may play a role in shaping the microbial communities on tree bark and rock surfaces.

In terms of geographical distribution, Psammina species have been reported from several European countries. The genus has been documented in the United Kingdom, the Netherlands, France, Germany, Luxembourg, and Ukraine. However, at least one species, P. tropica, has been reported from Brazil, indicating that the genus may have a wider distribution than currently known.

== Species ==
As of August 2024, Species Fungorum (in the Catalogue of Life) accept 10 species of Psammina:

- Psammina bommerae Sacc. & M.Rousseau (1890)
- Psammina elegiae S.J.Lee & Crous (2003)
- Psammina filamentosa Kolk & Earl.-Benn. (2020)
- Psammina inflata Earl.-Benn. & D.Hawksw. (1999)
- Psammina lobariae (Diederich & Etayo) Earl.-Benn. & D.Hawksw. (2005)
- Psammina mariae-theresiae Dias & Teixeira (1963)
- Psammina palmata Earl.-Benn. & D.Hawksw. (2005)
- Psammina simplex Earl.-Benn. & D.Hawksw. (1999)
- Psammina stipitata D.Hawksw. (1979)
- Psammina tropica Aptroot & M.Cáceres (2016)

== See also ==
- List of Ascomycota genera incertae sedis
