= Microsphaeropsis =

Scientific classification
- Kingdom: Fungi
- Division: Ascomycota
- Class: Dothideomycetes
- Order: Pleosporales
- Family: Didymosphaeriaceae
- Genus: Microsphaeropsis; Syd. & P.Syd. (1916)

Type species
- Microsphaeropsis olivacea (Bonord.) Höhn. (1917)

Genus of fungi

Microsphaeropsis is a genus of fungi belonging to the family Didymosphaeriaceae.

The genus has a cosmopolitan distribution.

== Species ==
- Microsphaeropsis amaranthi (Ellis & Barthol.) Heiny & Mintz (1992)
- Microsphaeropsis amictus (Ellis & Everh.) Aa (2002)
- Microsphaeropsis arundinis (S.Ahmad) B.Sutton (1980)
- Microsphaeropsis atrocylindrocollifera Matsush. (2003)
- Microsphaeropsis bakeri Syd. & P.Syd. (1916)
- Microsphaeropsis betulae (Laubert) Aa (2002)
- Microsphaeropsis caffra Matsush. (1996)
- Microsphaeropsis caloplacae Etayo & Yazıcı (2009)
- Microsphaeropsis centaureae Morgan-Jones (1975)
- Microsphaeropsis cinnamomi-glanduliferi (Henn.) Aa (2002)
- Microsphaeropsis clidemiae B.Sutton (1980)
- Microsphaeropsis conielloides B.Sutton (1974)
- Microsphaeropsis diffusa Bianchin. (2001)
- Microsphaeropsis ephedrina (Grove) Hayova & Minter (2009)
- Microsphaeropsis globulosa (Sousa da Câmara) B.Sutton (1974)
- Microsphaeropsis glumarum (Ellis & Tracy) Boerema (2003)
- Microsphaeropsis glycyrrhizicola (Vassiljevsky) Aa & Vanev (2002)
- Microsphaeropsis hakeae (Bond.-Mont.) Vanev & Aa (2002)
- Microsphaeropsis hellebori (Cooke & Massee) Aa (2002)
- Microsphaeropsis heteropatellae (Höhn.) Höhn. (1919)
- Microsphaeropsis ixorae N.D.Sharma (1982)
- Microsphaeropsis lichenicola Etayo (2008)
- Microsphaeropsis maricae (Gutner) Aa & Vanev (2002)
- Microsphaeropsis miconiae J.L.Alves, R.W.Barreto & O.L.Pereira (2010)
- Microsphaeropsis microstegium (Syd. & P.Syd.) Aa (2002)
- Microsphaeropsis naumovii (Gucevič) Vanev & Aa (2002)
- Microsphaeropsis ochracea Carisse & Bernier (2002)
- Microsphaeropsis olivacea (Bonord.) Höhn. (1917)
- Microsphaeropsis ononidicola Thambugala, Camporesi & K.D.Hyde (2018)
- Microsphaeropsis onychiuri (Punith.) Morgan-Jones (1975)
- Microsphaeropsis paliformis Matsush. (2003)
- Microsphaeropsis physciae Brackel (2014)
- Microsphaeropsis pittospororum (Sacc.) G.F.Laundon (1984)
- Microsphaeropsis proteae (Crous & Denman) Crous & Denman (2011)
- Microsphaeropsis pseudaspera B.Sutton (1974)
- Microsphaeropsis rugospora Someya, Yaguchi & Udagawa (1997)
- Microsphaeropsis sarcinellae (V.P.Sahni) Morgan-Jones (1975)
- Microsphaeropsis spartii-juncei Wanas., Camporesi, E.B.G.Jones & K.D.Hyde (2018)
- Microsphaeropsis stellenboschensis Crous, M.J.Wingf. & Marinc. (2008)
- Microsphaeropsis strychnotis S.M.Lin & P.K.Chi (1994)
- Microsphaeropsis subcorticalis (P.Karst.) Höhn. (1919)
- Microsphaeropsis tuisiensis (Speg.) Aa (2002)
- Microsphaeropsis ulmicola (Sacc.) Aa (2002)
- Microsphaeropsis vagabunda (Sacc.) Höhn. (1919)
- Microsphaeropsis xerotis (Henn.) Aa (2002)
