= Kalmusia =

Scientific classification
- Kingdom: Fungi
- Division: Ascomycota
- Class: Dothideomycetes
- Order: Pleosporales
- Family: Didymosphaeriaceae
- Genus: Kalmusia; Niessl (1872)

Type species
- Kalmusia ebuli Niessl (1872)

Synonyms
- Diapleella Munk (1953)

Genus of fungi in the family Didymosphaeriaceae

Kalmusia is a genus of fungi in the family Didymosphaeriaceae. The genus was formerly placed in family Montagnulaceae, before that was dissolved. The widespread, genus was estimated to contain about 12 species in 2008, which has increased to 29 species in 2023.

The genus name of Kalmusia is in honour of Jakub Kalmus (1834 - 1870), who was a Bohemian doctor and Cryptogam researcher, who was a friend of the plant author.

The genus was circumscribed by Gustav Niessl von Mayendorf in Verh. Naturf. Vereins Brünn vol.10 on page 204 in 1872.

== Species ==
As accepted by Species Fungorum;

- Kalmusia actinidiae Ablak. & Koval (1961)
- Kalmusia amphiloga (Petr.) O.E. Erikss. (2006)
- Kalmusia araucariae Crous (2020)
- Kalmusia argentinensis Speg. (1902)
- Kalmusia aspera Morgan (1905)
- Kalmusia astronii Bat., Nascim. & Cif. (1957)
- Kalmusia chilensis Speg. (1910)
- Kalmusia clivensis (Berk. & Broome) M.E. Barr (1987)
- Kalmusia coffeicola Speg. (1909)
- Kalmusia cordylines Kular., Senan. & K.D. Hyde (2022)
- Kalmusia delognensis (Speg. & Roum.) G. Winter ex Petr. (1921)
- Kalmusia ebuli Niessl (1872)
- Kalmusia epimelaena Sacc. (1914)
- Kalmusia erioi Samarak., Thambugala & K.D. Hyde (2020)
- Kalmusia eucalyptina Speg. (1909)
- Kalmusia italica Thambug., Camporesi & K.D. Hyde (2015)
- Kalmusia jasmini Sousa da Câmara & Luz (1941)
- Kalmusia lactucae Rehm (1909)
- Kalmusia longispora (Verkley, Göker & Stielow) Ariyaw. & K.D. Hyde (2014)
- Kalmusia oranensis Speg. (1909)
- Kalmusia orysopsidis M.T. Lucas & Sousa da Câmara (1955)
- Kalmusia philippinarum Rehm (1914)
- Kalmusia pinicola Bonar (1965)
- Kalmusia sarothamni Feltgen (1901)
- Kalmusia spartii Wanas., Camporesi, E.B.G. Jones & K.D. Hyde (2015)
- Kalmusia stromatica Cooke & Massee (1891)
- Kalmusia surrecta (Cooke) Sacc. (1883)
- Kalmusia utahensis (Ellis & Everh.) Huhndorf & M.E. Barr (1992)
- Kalmusia variispora (Verkley, Göker & Stielow) Ariyaw. & K.D. Hyde (2014)

Former species;

- K. brevispora (Nagas. & Y. Otani) Y. Zhang ter, Kaz. Tanaka & C.L. Schoch (2009) = Neokalmusia brevispora, Didymosphaeriaceae
- K. coniothyrium (Fuckel) Huhndorf (1992) = Coniothyrium fuckelii, Coniothyriaceae
- K. ebuli f. sarothamni Mouton (1887) = Kalmusia ebuli
- K. eutypoides (Ellis & Everh.) Teng (1996) = Eutypa eutypoides, Diatrypaceae
- K. fraxini (Ellis & Everh.) Lindau (1897) = Cryptosphaeria eunomia, Diatrypaceae
- K. hemitapha (Berk. & Broome) Sacc. (1883) = Clypeosphaeria mamillana, Clypeosphaeriaceae
- K. hypotephra (Berk. & Broome) Sacc. (1883) = Clypeosphaeria mamillana, Clypeosphaeriaceae
- K. pulveracea (P. Karst.) Lindau (1897) = Cucurbitaria pulveracea, Cucurbitariaceae
- K. rubronotata (Berk. & Broome) Lindau (1897) = Cyclothyriella rubronotata, Cyclothyriellaceae
- K. scabrispora (Teng) Kaz. Tanaka, Y. Harada & M.E. Barr (2005) = Neokalmusia scabrispora, Didymosphaeriaceae
