= Didymosphaeria taiwanensis =

Scientific classification
- Kingdom: Fungi
- Division: Ascomycota
- Class: Dothideomycetes
- Order: Pleosporales
- Family: Didymosphaeriaceae
- Genus: Didymosphaeria
- Species: D. taiwanensis

Binomial name
- Didymosphaeria taiwanensis W.Y. Yen & C.C. Chi, (1954)

Species of fungus

Didymosphaeria taiwanensis is a plant pathogen that causes leaf blast disease of sugarcane.
