= Pseudotrichia =

Pseudotrichia may refer to:

- Pseudotrichia (gastropod), a genus of air-breathing land snails in the family Hygromiidae
- Pseudotrichia (fungus), a genus of fungi in the family Melanommataceae
