= Didymosphaerella =

Scientific classification
- Kingdom: Fungi
- Division: Ascomycota
- Class: Dothideomycetes
- Order: Pleosporales
- Family: Didymosphaeriaceae
- Genus: Didymosphaerella; Cooke

Genus of fungi

Didymosphaerella is a genus of fungi in the family Didymosphaeriaceae. It was originally placed in family Montagnulaceae, until that family was dissolved.

It is a monotypic genus now as 24 former species have been placed in other genera, leaving only Didymosphaerella yuccae A.W. Ramaley & M.E. Barr (2001), which was published in Ramaley, Mycotaxon 78: 435 in 2001.
