= Microsphaeropsis olivacea =

Scientific classification
- Kingdom: Fungi
- Division: Ascomycota
- Class: Dothideomycetes
- Order: Pleosporales
- Family: Didymosphaeriaceae
- Genus: Microsphaeropsis
- Species: M. olivacea

Binomial name
- Microsphaeropsis olivacea (Bonord.) Höhn. (1917)

Synonyms
- Coniothyrium olivaceum Bonord. (1870)

Species of fungus

Microsphaeropsis olivacea is a fungal species belonging to the family Didymosphaeriaceae. It is a widespread fungus that produces small, dark fruiting bodies (pycnidia) and is found in a wide range of terrestrial and aquatic habitats worldwide. The species is known both as a plant pathogen, causing dieback and cankers in woody plants, and as an occasional cause of skin infections in humans.

== Taxonomy & history ==
Microsphaeropsis was circumscribed by Franz Xaver Rudolf von Höhnel in 1917, with M. olivacea designated as the type species. This genus is characterized by pycnidia that are either immersed or erumpent, subglobose in shape, and occur either singly or in clusters. These pycnidia have ostioles and are composed of a wall made of angular cells. The conidiogenous cells within are phialidic, hyaline, and shaped like ampullae, dolia, or slightly cylindrical structures. The conidia are thin-walled, smooth or finely roughened, and may possess zero to one septa. Hönel described this species in 1917 from the former, Coniothyrium olivaceum, described by Bonord in 1869. M. olivacea remains as the officially recognized name, with molecular studies confirming its phylogenetic placement.

The genus name Microsphaeropsis comes from the Greek 'micros', meaning small, and 'sphaera', meaning sphere. This naming reflects the small, spherical shape of the microscopic features that are characteristic of this genus. The species name olivacea comes from Latin, meaning olive-colored, which describes the typical appearance of the fungus. Additionally, this fungus has been associated with olive leaf die back, among many other endophytic ascomycetes whose earliest records have origin in the Mediterranean, where olive trees, Olea europaea, are abundant.

== Description ==
Microsphaeropsis olivacea produces small, dark-colored fruiting bodies known as pycnidia. These pycnidia harbor conidia—hyaline, asexual spores—that are instrumental in the dispersal of the fungus. These spores are primarily dispersed through water and air currents. M. olivacea is without distinct diagnostic macro morphological features. Microsphaeropsis fungi are referred to as coniothyrium-like fungi, often being distinguished from other coelomycetes (a form-class of fungi), via their respective host symbionts. The type specimen of this species is held at the Kew Botanical Garden's fungarium.

== Distribution ==
Microsphaeropsis olivacea is a ubiquitous species with a wide variety of habitats and symbionts. The species has a worldwide distribution, with frequent occurrences in environmental samples.

== Habitat and ecology ==
This species is adaptable to both terrestrial and aquatic environments. On land, it predominantly affects woody plants, causing diseases such as dieback and cankers, in agricultural settings. In aquatic environments, M. olivacea has been isolated from a marine sponge.

== Pathogenicity ==
In terrestrial environments, M. olivacea poses a threat to agricultural productivity by infecting crops and causing woody plant diseases, leading to economic impacts. The species has also been identified as a pathogen in humans, causing skin infections.

== Research ==
Research on M. olivacea includes studies on its molecular identification and pathogenic mechanisms. Biochemical investigations have identified secondary metabolites such as cerebrosides.
