= Microsphaeropsis caloplacae =

Scientific classification
- Domain: Eukaryota
- Kingdom: Fungi
- Division: Ascomycota
- Class: Dothideomycetes
- Order: Pleosporales
- Family: Didymosphaeriaceae
- Genus: Microsphaeropsis
- Species: M. caloplacae

Binomial name
- Microsphaeropsis caloplacae Etayo & Yazıcı (2009)

Species of lichen

Microsphaeropsis caloplacae is a species of lichenicolous (lichen-eating) fungus in the family Didymosphaeriaceae. It is only known to occur in a single locality along the Kızılırmak River in Turkey, where it grows parasitically on the crustose lichen Caloplaca persica.

== Taxonomy ==
The fungus was formally described as a new species in 2009 by Javier Etayo and Kenan Yazıcı. The type specimen was collected by the second author along the Kızılırmak River (Sivas Province) at an altitude of 1,300 m (4,300 ft); there, the lichen was found growing on the apothecial discs of the crustose lichen Caloplaca persica, which itself was growing on the bark of a Populus tree. The species epithet refers to the genus of the host lichen, Caloplaca.

The authors noted that they placed this species provisionally into Microsphaeropsis "with some hesitation", as the species in this genus typically infect plant leaves.

== Description ==
Microsphaeropsis caloplacae produces pycnidia that are entirely immersed in the host lichen's apothecial discs. They are apparent as barely visible blackish spots with a diameter between 30 and 50 μm, with an ostiole (opening). The pycnidial cavity is filled with conidia that measure 7.2–8.3 by 4–6 μm. Infections by this fungus do not seem to be highly pathogenic to the lichen, as the hymenium of the apothecia continues producing spores as normal.

== Habitat and distribution ==
Microsphaeropsis caloplacae is only known from the type locality, a well-lit site with typical steppe vegetation, about 50 m (160 ft) from the Kızılırmak River.
