= Cilioplea =

Scientific classification
- Kingdom: Fungi
- Division: Ascomycota
- Class: Dothideomycetes
- Order: Pleosporales
- Family: Lophiostomataceae
- Genus: Cilioplea; Munk (1953)

Type species
- Cilioplea coronata (Niessl) Munk (1953)

Species
- C. amplispora C. coronata C. fulgurata C. genisticola C. kansensis C. montana C. nivalis C. occidentalis C. straminis

Genus of fungi

Cilioplea is a genus of fungi in the family Lophiostomataceae. The genus, circumscribed by Anders Munk in 1953, contains nine widespread species.
