= Jean-Édouard Bommer =

Belgian botanist (1829-1895)

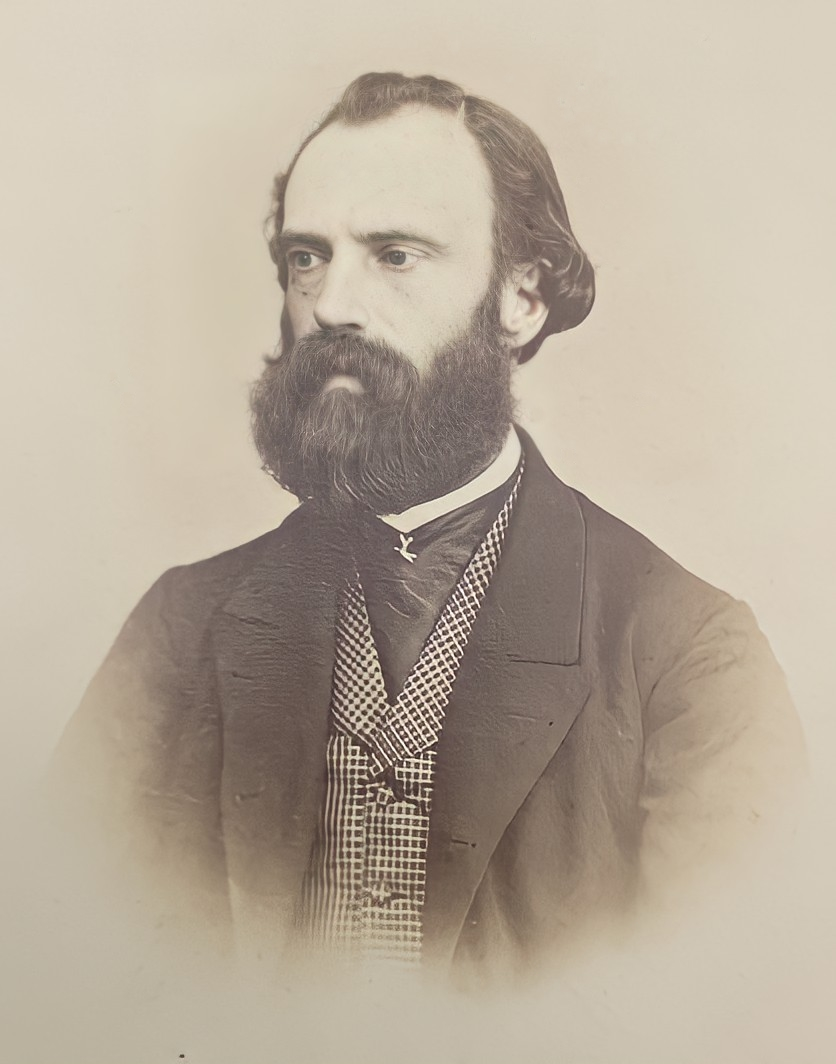
J-E Bommer

Joseph (Jean) Édouard Bommer (16 November 1829, Brussels – 19 February 1895, Brussels) was a Belgian botanist specializing in the field of pteridology. He was the husband of mycologist Elise Caroline Destrée de Bommer (1832-1910).

== Life and work ==
Bommer was born in Brussels and after the early death of his father he worked as a typesetter for a printer and became interested in science through visits to the Établissement Géographique de Bruxelles. Here he worked briefly under Philippe Vandermaelen and in 1855 he joined Henri Galeotti's staff at the botanical garden of the Royal Horticulture Society. Despite no formal training in botany, in 1856 he acquired a position as an assistant at the Jardin Botanique National de Belgique. When the garden was taken over by the state he became head succeeding Auguste-Joseph Schram. Here, he later served as curator and as a provisional director. In 1870 he became a professor at the state horticultural school in Vilvorde, followed by a professorship in botany at the University of Brussels (1872).

In 1862 he was a founding member of the Société Royale de Botanique de Belgique. He was also co-founder of the Société Belge de Microscopie.

Although he worked on different types of plants, he was primarily interested in ferns. Bommer demonstrated that ferns could absorb water from their leaves. At the time of his death, he was working on a monograph of the maidenhair fern genus, Adiantum. The genus Bommeria (E.Fourn. ex Baill.) of the family Pteridaceae is named in his honor.

== Selected publications ==
- Monographie de la classe des fougères : classification, 1867 - Monograph on ferns; classification.
- Notice sur le Jardin botanique de Bruxelles, 1871.
- Sur l'amylogenèse dans la règne végétal, 1874 - On amylogenesis within the plant kingdom.
