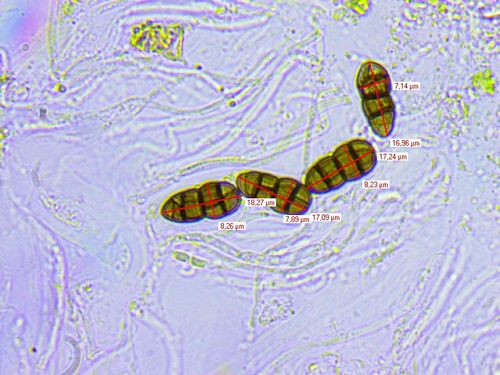
- Teichospora mariae

Scientific classification
- Kingdom: Fungi
- Division: Ascomycota
- Class: Dothideomycetes
- Order: Pleosporales
- Family: Teichosporaceae
- Genus: Teichospora; Fuckel

Type species
- Teichospora trabicola Fuckel

= Teichospora =

Genus of fungi

Teichospora is a genus of fungi in the family Teichosporaceae.

== Species ==
As accepted by Species Fungorum;

- Teichospora albulae E. Müll. (1953)
- Teichospora ampullacea Rehm (1872)
- Teichospora aurantiacinotata (Mugambi & Huhndorf) Jaklitsch & Voglmayr (2016)
- Teichospora austroafricana (Marinc., M.J. Wingf. & Crous) Jaklitsch & Voglmayr (2016)
- Teichospora bartholomewii M.E. Barr (1990)
- Teichospora borealis (Ellis & Everh.) M.E. Barr (1990)
- Teichospora bougainvilleae P.G. Sathe & K.M. Mogarkar (1973)
- Teichospora brevirostris (Fr.) Fuckel (1870)
- Teichospora chandrapurensis P.G. Sathe & Rajd. (1973)
- Teichospora claviformis (Mugambi & Huhndorf) Jaklitsch & Voglmayr (2016)
- Teichospora commutata Sacc. (1883)
- Teichospora comptoniae (Cooke & Ellis) M.E. Barr (1990)
- Teichospora congesta (Cooke & Ellis) M.E. Barr (1990)
- Teichospora coremae (Ellis & Everh.) M.E. Barr (1990)
- Teichospora cruciformis (Mugambi & Huhndorf) Jaklitsch & Voglmayr (2016)
- Teichospora deflectens P. Karst. (1873)
- Teichospora ellipsoidea Wehm. & S. Ahmad (1964)
- Teichospora ephedrae Esfand. (1950)
- Teichospora fusiformis Wehm. & S. Ahmad (1964)
- Teichospora grandicipis (Joanne E. Taylor & Crous) Jaklitsch & Voglmayr (2016)
- Teichospora hesperia M.E. Barr (1993)
- Teichospora ignavis (De Not.) P. Karst. (1873)
- Teichospora juglandis (Ellis & Everh.) M.E. Barr (1990)
- Teichospora kenyensis (Mugambi & Huhndorf) Jaklitsch & Voglmayr (2016)
- Teichospora kingiae Crous & M.J. Wingf. (2016)
- Teichospora lantanae R. Rao (1966)
- Teichospora lonicerae Z.Q. Yuan & M.E. Barr (1995)
- Teichospora mariae (Y. Zhang ter, J. Fourn. & K.D. Hyde) Jaklitsch & Voglmayr (2016)
- Teichospora minimispora M.E. Barr (1990)
- Teichospora prosopidis R. Rao (1969)
- Teichospora proteae (Marinc., M.J. Wingf. & Crous) Jaklitsch & Voglmayr (2016)
- Teichospora pusilla Jaklitsch & Voglmayr (2016)
- Teichospora quercina (Ellis & Everh.) M.E. Barr (1990)
- Teichospora radicans (Samuels & E. Müll.) Jaklitsch & Voglmayr (2016)
- Teichospora ribis M.E. Barr (1990)
- Teichospora sambuci (Earle) M.E. Barr (1990)
- Teichospora scharifii Petr. (1953)
- Teichospora tennesseensis (Mugambi, A.N. Mill. & Huhndorf) Jaklitsch & Voglmayr (2016)
- Teichospora thailandica (Thambug. & K.D. Hyde) Jaklitsch & Voglmayr (2016)
- Teichospora trabicola Fuckel (1870)
- Teichospora uniseriata (Mugambi, A.N. Mill. & Huhndorf) Jaklitsch & Voglmayr (2016)
- Teichospora woodfordiae R. Rao & Modak (1973)
- Teichospora zabriskieana (Ellis & Everh.) M.E. Barr (1990)
