= Frederick Currey (mycologist) =

English mycologist (1819 – 1881)

Frederick Currey FLS FRS (August 1819 – 8 September 1881) was an English mycologist and botanist.

== Biography ==
Frederick Currey was one of the brothers of the architect Henry Currey (1820–1900). Their father was Benjamin Currey (1786–1848), Clerk of the Parliaments. After education at Eton College, Frederick Currey matriculated in 1837 at Trinity College, Cambridge. There he graduated in 1841 with a B.A. and in 1844 with an M.A. He was admitted at Lincoln's Inn in June 1839 and called to the bar in 1844. He practised as conveyancer and equity draughtsman.

Currey's scientific publications were primarily in the Transactions of the Linnean Society, the Quarterly Journal of Microscopical Science, and other learned journals. He translated several German textbooks, including Hermann Schacht's 1851 book Das Mikroscop und seine Anwendung insbesondere für Pflanzen-Anatomie und Physiologie (The microscope, and its application to vegetable anatomy and physiology, 1853; 2nd edition, 1855) and Wilhelm Hofmeister's 1851 book Vergleichende Untersuchungen der Keimung, Entfaltung und Fruchtbildung höherer Kryptogamen (Moose, Farrn, Equisetaceen, Rhizocarpeen und Lycopodiaceen) und der Samenbildung der Coniferen (On the germination, development and fructification of the higher Cryptogamia and on the fructification of the Coniferae, 1862). Currey was one of the first members of the Greenwich Natural History Club, founded in 1852. In 1857 the club appointed a committee to make a report on the district's flora. Currey chaired the committee and drafted the report, which enumerated 395 species of fungi. In 1859 he was the club's leader for a field day to identify the cryptogams of the Greenwich neighbourhood. The route was from Southborough Road Station (in Southborough, Bromley) to Chislehurst, St Paul's Cray Common, Petts Wood and back to Chislehurst. The participants in the field day found almost forty species of fungi in Petts Wood. In 1861 he edited the Natural History Review. He edited the 2nd edition of Charles David Badham's A Treatise of the Esculent Funguses.

Currey was elected in 1856 a Fellow of the Linnean Society of London and in 1858 a Fellow of the Royal Society. As successor to John Joseph Bennett, he served as secretary of the Linnean Society from 1860 to 1880. Currey was the society's treasurer and vice-president from 1880 until his death in 1881. Currey's manuscripts on fungi, as well as a crayon portrait of Currey, are at the Linnean Society. His letters are at the Natural History Museum, London.

Currey's collection of fungi is now at Kew Herbarium. The genus Curreya was named by Pier Andrea Saccardo in honour of Frederick Currey.

Currey died in Blackheath, London. His burial took place at Weybridge Cemetery, where his deceased wife was interred some years earlier.

== Selected publications ==
- Currey, Frederick (November 26, 1853). "Fungi of the Neighbourhood of Greenwich". The Phytologist. 5: 121–122.
- —— (February 25, 1854). "Fungi of the Neighbourhood of Greenwich". The Phytologist. 5: 144–145.
- —— (1854). "On two new Fungi". Quarterly Journal of Microscopical Science (8): 240–242. doi:10.1242/jcs.s1-2.8.240.
- —— (1855). "On the Spiral Threads of the Genus Trichia". Quarterly Journal of Microscopical Science (9): 15–21. doi:10.1242/jcs.s1-3.9.15.
- —— (1855). "On the Reproductive Organs of certain Fungi". Quarterly Journal of Microscopical Science (12): 263–273. doi:10.1242/jcs.s1-3.12.263.
- —— (1856). "On the Reproductive Organs of certain Fungi, with some remarhs on Germination". Quarterly Journal of Microscopical Science (15): 192–200. doi:10.1242/jcs.s1-4.15.192.
- —— (1857). "XXVI. On the fructification of certain sphæriaceous fungi". Philosophical Transactions of the Royal Society of London. 147: 543–553. doi:10.1098/rstl.1857.0027.
- —— (1857). "XXVIII. On the fructification of certain Sphæriaceous Fungi". Proceedings of the Royal Society of London. 8: 588–589. doi:10.1098/rspl.1856.0153.
- —— (1857). "On Some Points in the Structure and Physiology of certain Fungi, with notices of the occurrence of some species new to this country". Quarterly Journal of Microscopical Science (19): 115–134. doi:10.1242/jcs.s1-5.19.115.
- —— (1857). "On a Species of Pilobolus". Journal of the Proceedings of the Linnean Society of London. Botany. 1 (4): 162–167. doi:10.1111/j.1095-8339.1857.tb02442.x.
- —— (1857). "On a New Species of Peziza, being the full Development of Sclerotium roseum, Kneiff" (PDF). Botanical Journal of the Linnean Society. 1 (4): 147–149.
- —— (1858). "XX.-Synopsis of the Fructification of the Compound Sphaeriae of the Hookerian Herbarium" (PDF). Transactions of the Linnean Society of London. 22 (3): 257–287. doi:10.1111/j.1096-3642.1856.tb00098.x.
- —— (1858). "On some British Fresh-water Algæ". Quarterly Journal of Microscopical Science (24): 207–216. doi:10.1242/jcs.s1-6.24.207.
- —— (1859). "III. On the existence of amorphous starch in a new tuberaceous fungus". Proceedings of the Royal Society of London. 9: 119–123. doi:10.1098/rspl.1857.0024.
- —— (1859). "Mycological Notes". Quarterly Journal of Microscopical Science (28): 225–235. doi:10.1242/jcs.s1-7.28.225.
- ——; Hanbury, Daniel (1860). "VIII. Remarks on Sclerotium stipitatum, Berk. et Curr., Pachyma Cocos, Fries, and some similar productions" (PDF). Transactions of the Linnean Society of London. 23 (1): 93–97. doi:10.1111/j.1096-3642.1860.tb00122.x.
- —— (1863). "VIII. Notes on British Fungi" (PDF). Transactions of the Linnean Society of London (2): 151–160.
- —— (1864). "XXIV. Notes on British Fungi" (PDF). Transactions of the Linnean Society of London (3): 491–496.
- Welwitsch, Friedrich; —— (1868). "VI. Fungi Angolenses.–A Description of the Fungi collected by Dr. Friedrich Welwitsch in Angola during the years 1850–1861" (PDF). Transactions of the Linnean Society of London. 26 (1): 279–294. doi:10.1111/j.1096-3642.1968.tb00507.x.
- —— (1873). "On a new Genus in the Order Mucedines". Journal of the Linnean Society of London, Botany. 13 (69): 333–334. doi:10.1111/j.1095-8339.1873.tb00100.x.
- —— (1876). "V. On a Collection of Fungi made by Mr. Sulpiz Kurz, Curator of the Botanic Garden, Calcutta" (PDF). Transactions of the Linnean Society of London. 2nd Series: Botany. 1 (3a): 119–131. doi:10.1111/j.1095-8339.1880.tb00251.x.
