= Tremateia =

Scientific classification
- Kingdom: Fungi
- Division: Ascomycota
- Class: Dothideomycetes
- Order: Pleosporales
- Family: Didymosphaeriaceae
- Genus: Tremateia; Kohlm., Volkm.-Kohlm. & O.E. Erikss.

Type species
- Tremateia halophila Kohlm., Volkm.-Kohlm. & O.E. Erikss.

Genus of fungi

Tremateia is a genus of fungi in the class Dothideomycetes. and in the family Didymosphaeriaceae and order Pleosporales.

== Species ==
As accepted by Species Fungorum;

- Tremateia arunicola Wanas., E.B.G. Jones & K.D. Hyde (2016)
- Tremateia camporesii Samarak. & K.D. Hyde (2020)
- Tremateia chiangraiensis Mapook & K.D. Hyde (2020)
- Tremateia chromolaenae Mapook & K.D. Hyde (2020)
- Tremateia guiyangensis Jin F. Zhang, Jian K. Liu, K.D. Hyde & Z.Y. Liu (2016)
- Tremateia halophila Kohlm., Volkm.-Kohlm. & O.E. Erikss. (1995)
- Tremateia lamiacearum Samarak. & K.D. Hyde (2020)
- Tremateia murispora Y. Feng, S.N. Zhang & Z.Y. Liu (2019)
- Tremateia thailandensis Mapook & K.D. Hyde (2020)
