= Bimuria =

Scientific classification
- Kingdom: Fungi
- Division: Ascomycota
- Class: Dothideomycetes
- Order: Pleosporales
- Family: Didymosphaeriaceae
- Genus: Bimuria; D. Hawksw., Chea & Sheridan

Type species
- Bimuria novae-zelandiae D. Hawksw., Chea & Sheridan

Genus of fungi

Bimuria is a genus of fungi in the family Didymosphaeriaceae; according to the 2007 Outline of Ascomycota, the placement in this family is uncertain.
