= Syncarpella =

Scientific classification
- Domain: Eukaryota
- Kingdom: Fungi
- Division: Ascomycota
- Class: Dothideomycetes
- Order: Pleosporales
- Family: Cucurbitariaceae
- Genus: Syncarpella; Theiss. & Syd.

Type species
- Syncarpella tumefaciens (Ellis & Harkn.) Theiss. & Syd.

Genus of fungi

Syncarpella is a genus of fungi in the family Cucurbitariaceae.

== Species ==
As accepted by Species Fungorum;

- Syncarpella castagnei (Speg.) Theiss. & Syd. (1915)
- Syncarpella congesta (Speg.) Boise (1989)
- Syncarpella missionum (Speg.) Theiss. & Syd. (1915)
- Syncarpella ribis A.W. Ramaley & M.E. Barr (1997)
- Syncarpella sulcata (Berl. & Voglino) M.E. Barr & Boise (1989)
- Syncarpella tetonensis (Ellis & Everh.) M.E. Barr & Boise (1989)
- Syncarpella tumefaciens (Ellis & Harkn.) Theiss. & Syd. (1915)

Former species;

- S. heliopsidis (Schwein.) Balletto (1989) = Gibberidea heliopsidis, Botryosphaeriaceae
- S. occidentalis (Ellis) M.E. Barr & Boise (1989) = Cucurbitaria occidentalis, Cucurbitariaceae
- S. tuberculiformis (Ellis) Theiss. & Syd. (1915) = Plowrightia tuberculiformis, Dothioraceae
