= Curreya =

Scientific classification
- Domain: Eukaryota
- Kingdom: Fungi
- Division: Ascomycota
- Class: Dothideomycetes
- Order: Pleosporales
- Family: Cucurbitariaceae
- Genus: Curreya; Sacc.

Type species
- Curreya conorum (Fuckel) Sacc.

Genus of fungi

Curreya is a genus of fungi in the family Cucurbitariaceae.

The genus name of Curreya is in honour of Frederick Currey (1819–1881), a British botanist and Secretary of the Linnean Society between 1860 – 1880.

The genus was circumscribed by Pier Andrea Saccardo in Syll. Fung. Vol.2 on page 651 in 1883.

== Species ==
As accepted by Species Fungorum;

- Curreya conorum (Fuckel) Sacc. (1883)
- Curreya corni Dearn. (1936)
- Curreya insignis Sacc. (1922)
- Curreya peckiana Sacc. (1915)
- Curreya pithyophila (J.C. Schmidt & Kunze) Arx & E. Müll. (1975)
- Curreya rhoina Feltgen (1901)

Former species;

- C. acaciae Crous & M.J. Wingf. (2015) = Magnibotryascoma acaciae, Teichosporaceae
- C. austroafricana Marinc., M.J. Wingf. & Crous (2008) = Teichospora austroafricana, Teichosporaceae
- C. bambusicola Speg. (1888) = Epibotrys bambusicola, Dothideomycetes
- C. berberidis Rehm (1899) = Dictyodothis berberidis, Dothideaceae
- C. excavata (Cooke & Ellis) Sacc. (1883) = Dictyodothis excavata, Dothideaceae
- C. flotoviana (Körb.) Höhn. (1909) = Mycoporum flotovianum, Mycoporaceae
- C. grandicipis (Joanne E. Taylor & Crous) Joanne E. Taylor & Crous (2011) = Teichospora grandicipis, Teichosporaceae
- C. harknessii Ellis & Everh. (1892) = Dothiora harknessii, Botryosphaeriaceae
- C. palmincola Rehm (1907) = Hyalocurreya palmincola, Cookellaceae
- C. pithyophila var. cembrae (Rehm) Arx (1983) = Curreya pithyophila
- C. proteae Marinc., M.J. Wingf. & Crous (2008) = Teichospora proteae, Teichosporaceae
- C. pusilla P. Karst. & Malbr. (1894) = Chaetoplea pusilla, Phaeosphaeriaceae
- C. rehmii Schnabl (1892) = Seimatosporium ribis-alpini, Sporocadaceae
- C. sandicensis Ellis & Everh. (1897) = Uleomyces sandicensis, Cookellaceae
