= Immotthia =

Scientific classification
- Kingdom: Fungi
- Division: Ascomycota
- Class: Dothideomycetes
- Order: Pleosporales
- Family: Teichosporaceae
- Genus: Immotthia; M.E. Barr

Synonyms
- Immothia M.E.Barr

Genus of fungi

Immotthia is a genus of fungi in the family Roussoellaceae.

It was formerly in family Teichosporaceae.

It is only found in parts of Europe and parts of North and South America.

== Species ==
As accepted by Species Fungorum;

- Immotthia atrograna (Cooke & Ellis) M.E. Barr (1993)
- Immotthia atroseptata (Piroz.) M.E. Barr (2002)
- Immotthia bambusae H.B. Jiang & Phookamsak (2021)

Former species; I. hypoxylon (Ellis & Everh.) M.E. Barr (1987) = Immotthia atrograna
