= Phaeodothis =

Scientific classification
- Kingdom: Fungi
- Division: Ascomycota
- Class: Dothideomycetes
- Order: Pleosporales
- Family: Didymosphaeriaceae
- Genus: Phaeodothis; Syd. & P. Syd.

Type species
- Phaeodothis tricuspidis Syd. & P. Syd.

Genus of fungi

Phaeodothis is a genus of fungi in the family Didymosphaeriaceae.

== Species ==
As accepted by Species Fungorum;

- Phaeodothis apuleiae Speg. (1912)
- Phaeodothis congoensis Sacc. (1906)
- Phaeodothis cordifolii T.S. Ramakr. & Sundaram (1954)
- Phaeodothis costaricensis F. Stevens (1927)
- Phaeodothis daphnopsidis (Henn.) Theiss. & Syd. (1915)
- Phaeodothis effusa (A.L. Sm.) Syd. (1904)
- Phaeodothis fallacus (Sacc.) Theiss. & P. Syd. (1972)
- Phaeodothis gigantochloae Rehm (1914)
- Phaeodothis hainanensis (Teng) You Z. Wang (2007)
- Phaeodothis hendrickxii Hansf. (1947)
- Phaeodothis hyparrheniae Nattrass (1937)
- Phaeodothis isachnes Petch (1922)
- Phaeodothis mori Tennakoon, C.H. Kuo & K.D. Hyde (2020)
- Phaeodothis muroiana I. Hino & Katum. (1958)
- Phaeodothis polystoma Syd. & P. Syd. (1920)
- Phaeodothis rapaneae Hansf. (1947)
- Phaeodothis ribesiella (Nyl. ex Vain.) Aptroot (1995)
- Phaeodothis sparsa Petch (1917)
- Phaeodothis tricuspidis Syd. & P. Syd. (1904)
- Phaeodothis tristachyae Syd. & P. Syd. (1912)
- Phaeodothis winteri (Niessl) Aptroot (1995)

Former species;

- P. caaguazuensis (Speg.) Syd. & P. Syd. (1904) = Microcyclus tinctoria, Planistromellaceae
- P. cladonema (Wedd.) Theiss. & Syd. (1915) = Clypeococcum cladonema, Polycoccaceae
- P. fallax (Sacc.) Theiss. & Syd. (1915) = Phyllachora fallax, Phyllachoraceae
- P. grovei Sacc. (1916) = Englerodothis grovei, Parmulariaceae
- P. stenostoma (Ellis & Tracy) Theiss. & Syd. (1915) = Phaeodothis winteri
- P. yuccae (Ellis & Everh.) Sacc. & D. Sacc. (1905) = Piptarthron yuccae, Planistromellaceae
