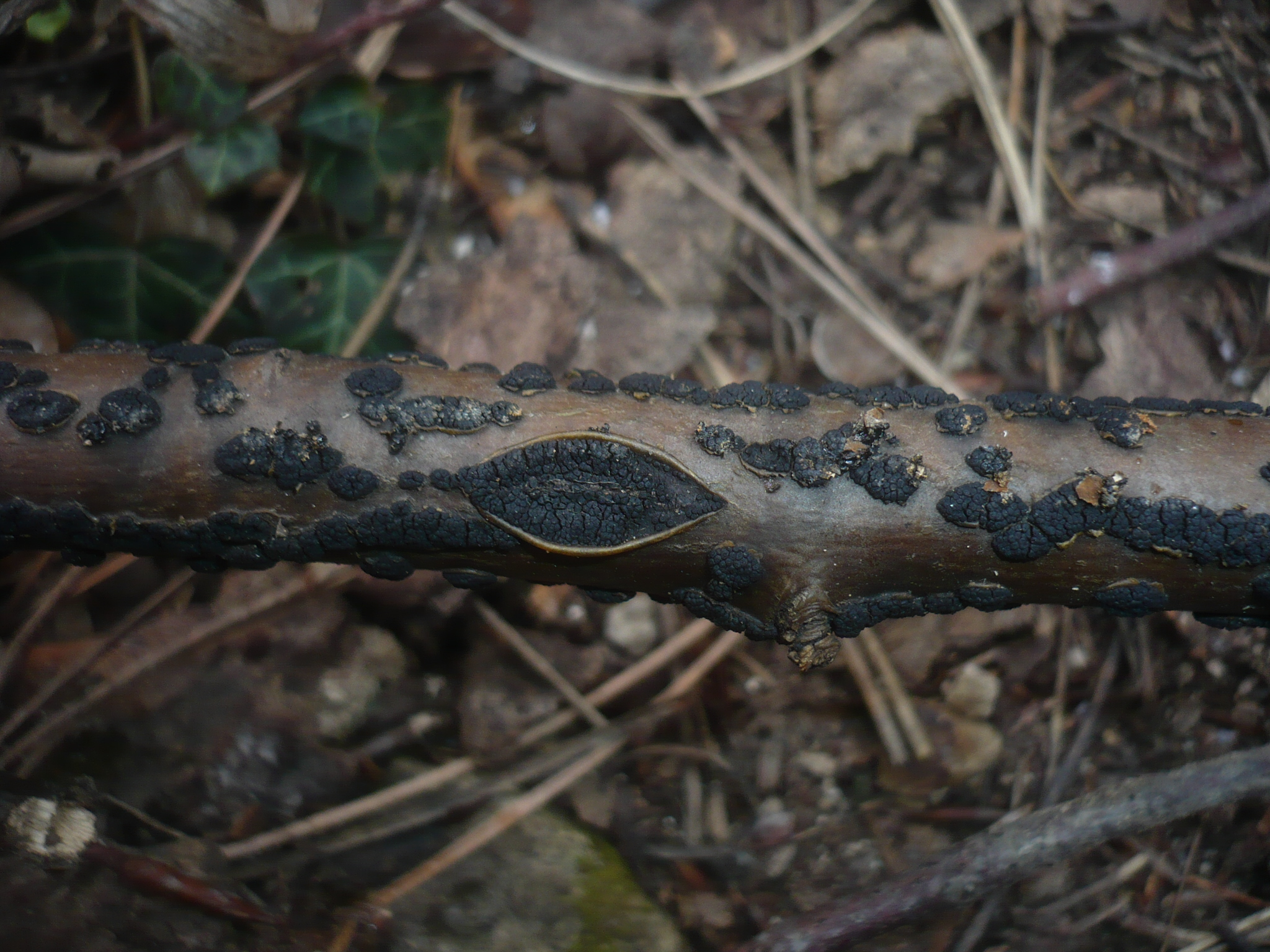
- Cucurbitaria laburni

Scientific classification
- Domain: Eukaryota
- Kingdom: Fungi
- Division: Ascomycota
- Class: Dothideomycetes
- Order: Pleosporales
- Family: Cucurbitariaceae
- Genus: Cucurbitaria; Gray (1821)

Type species
- Cucurbitaria berberidis (Pers.) Gray (1821)

Synonyms
- Crotonocarpia Fuckel 1870); Cyathisphaera Dumort. (1822); Gemmamyces Casagr. (1969); Leucothyridium Speg. (1909); Phialospora Raf. (1832)

= Cucurbitaria =

Genus of fungi

Cucurbitaria is a genus of pyrenomycetous fungi in the family Cucurbitariaceae. The genus was circumscribed by Samuel Frederick Gray in 1821.

== Species ==
As accepted by Species Fungorum;

- Cucurbitaria acanthophylli Bubák (1914)
- Cucurbitaria acervata (Fr.) Ces. & De Not. (1863)
- Cucurbitaria adesmicola Speg. (1909)
- Cucurbitaria ahmadii Mirza (1968)
- Cucurbitaria alni Mirza (1968)
- Cucurbitaria amorphae (Wallr.) Fuckel (1870)
- Cucurbitaria arbuti Bondartseva (1960)
- Cucurbitaria arizonica Ellis & Everh. (1902)
- Cucurbitaria aspegrenii Maire (1926)
- Cucurbitaria asteropycnidia P. Crouan & H. Crouan (1867)
- Cucurbitaria atraphaxis (Rehm) Vasyag. (1987)
- Cucurbitaria bartschii Bat. & Cif. (1957)
- Cucurbitaria berberidicola Appad., Gafforov, Abdurazakov & K.D. Hyde (2021)
- Cucurbitaria berberidis (Pers.) Gray (1821)
- Cucurbitaria bicolor Fuckel (1871)
- Cucurbitaria brevibarbata Berk. & M.A. Curtis (1875)
- Cucurbitaria callista Berk. & M.A. Curtis (1875)
- Cucurbitaria caraganae P. Karst. (1878)
- Cucurbitaria castaneae Sacc. (1873)
- Cucurbitaria coluteae (Rabenh.) Auersw. (1870)
- Cucurbitaria coryli Fuckel (1871)
- Cucurbitaria crustosa (Speg.) Petr. (1934)
- Cucurbitaria cytisi Mirza (1968)
- Cucurbitaria delitescens Sacc. (1881)
- Cucurbitaria destreae Oudem. (1894)
- Cucurbitaria dulcamarae (Kunze & J.C. Schmidt) Fr. (1849)
- Cucurbitaria echinata Ellis & Everh. (1890)
- Cucurbitaria elaeagni Höhn. (1918)
- Cucurbitaria emeri Mirza (1968)
- Cucurbitaria ephedricola Esfand. (1947)
- Cucurbitaria erratica Peck (1907)
- Cucurbitaria euonymi Cooke (1874)
- Cucurbitaria eurotiae Kravtzev (1961)
- Cucurbitaria ferulae Koshk. (1970)
- Cucurbitaria friesii Kuntze (1898)
- Cucurbitaria grewiae R. Rao (1972)
- Cucurbitaria guarapiensis (Speg.) Kuntze (1898)
- Cucurbitaria halimodendri Rehm (1911)
- Cucurbitaria helianthemi Ade (1923)
- Cucurbitaria hirtella Bacc. & P. Avetta (1884)
- Cucurbitaria homalea (Fr.) Sacc. (1883)
- Cucurbitaria ilicicola Petr. (1929)
- Cucurbitaria indica Tilak, S.B. Kale & S.V.S. Kale (1971)
- Cucurbitaria indigoferae E. Müll. & S. Ahmad (1957)
- Cucurbitaria interstitialis (Cooke & Peck) M.E. Barr (1986)
- Cucurbitaria juglandina Ellis & Barthol. (1902)
- Cucurbitaria karstenii Sacc. (1883)
- Cucurbitaria kurdica Bubák (1914)
- Cucurbitaria laurocerasi W. Phillips & Plowr. (1881)
- Cucurbitaria leptospora De Not. (1863)
- Cucurbitaria lespedezae Ziling (1936)
- Cucurbitaria mahoniae Richon (1889)
- Cucurbitaria marchica Kirschst. (1936)
- Cucurbitaria moriformis (Fuckel) M.E. Barr (1987)
- Cucurbitaria naucosa (Fr.) Fuckel (1870)
- Cucurbitaria negundinis G. Winter (1886)
- Cucurbitaria nemoricola Kirschst. (1935)
- Cucurbitaria nitidula Bat. & Cif. (1957)
- Cucurbitaria occidentalis Ellis (1881)
- Cucurbitaria occulta Fuckel (1870)
- Cucurbitaria oromediterranea Jaklitsch & Voglmayr (2017)
- Cucurbitaria pakistanica Petr. (1954)
- Cucurbitaria persica Petr. (1940)
- Cucurbitaria piceae Borthw. (1909)
- Cucurbitaria pilosa Mirza (1968)
- Cucurbitaria plagia Cooke & Massee (1888)
- Cucurbitaria pontica Săvul. & Sandu (1940)
- Cucurbitaria praeandicola Speg. (1912)
- Cucurbitaria pricesiana Bagnis (1877)
- Cucurbitaria pritzeliana Henn. (1903)
- Cucurbitaria pruni-spinosae Rehm (1912)
- Cucurbitaria pteleae Hollós (1906)
- Cucurbitaria pulveracea P. Karst. (1873)
- Cucurbitaria rabenhorstii Auersw. (1865)
- Cucurbitaria ribis Niessl (1872)
- Cucurbitaria rimulina Fairm. (1922)
- Cucurbitaria rubefaciens Petr. (1923)
- Cucurbitaria salicina Fuckel (1870)
- Cucurbitaria sambucina Naumov (1927)
- Cucurbitaria seriata Peck (1876)
- Cucurbitaria sinica Teng (1936)
- Cucurbitaria solitaria Ellis (1881)
- Cucurbitaria spartii (Nees ex Fr.) Ces. & De Not. (1863)
- Cucurbitaria staphula Dearn. ex R.H. Arnold & R.C. Russell (1961)
- Cucurbitaria steineri Petr. (1963)
- Cucurbitaria tamaricina Smyk (1970)
- Cucurbitaria tenacella (Fr.) M.E. Barr (1990)
- Cucurbitaria transcaspica Rehm (1912)
- Cucurbitaria tunetana A.L. Guyot (1958)
- Cucurbitaria typhinae Ellis & Everh. (1903)
- Cucurbitaria vitis Schulzer (1870)
