= Roussoellaceae =

Scientific classification
- Kingdom: Fungi
- Division: Ascomycota
- Class: Dothideomycetes
- Order: Pleosporales
- Family: Roussoellaceae; Jian K. Liu, Phook., D.Q. Dai & K.D. Hyde

Family of fungi

The Roussoellaceae are a family of fungi in the order Pleosporales. As accepted by Wijayawardene et al. 2020;

The family was introduced by Liu et al. in 2014 and originally contained Neoroussoella, Roussoella and Roussoellopsis. It is a well-resolved family in the Pleosporales order. Many species of the Roussoellaceae family have been described from terrestrial plants including bamboo, palms and mangrove trees. It has also been found in the marine environment and found on the seagrass Posidonia oceanica, with the green alga Flabellia petiolata and also the brown alga Padina pavonica, which were all collected in the Mediterranean Sea.

== Genera ==
With amount of species;

- Appendispora K.D. Hyde (2)
- Cytoplea Bizz. & Sacc. (5)
- Elongatopedicellata Jin F. Zhang, Jian K. Liu, K.D. Hyde & Zi Y. Liu (1)
- Immotthia M.E. Barr (2)
- Neoroussoella Jian K. Liu, Phook. & K.D. Hyde (7)
- Pararoussoella Wanas., E.B.G. Jones & K.D. Hyde (3)
- Pseudoneoconiothyrium Wanas., Phukhams., Camporesi & K.D. Hyde (1)
- Pseudoroussoella Mapook & K.D. Hyde (2)
- Roussoella Sacc. (38)
- Roussoellopsis I. Hino & Katum. (3)
- Setoarthopyrenia Mapook & K.D. Hyde (1)
- Xenoroussoella Mapook & K.D. Hyde (1)
