= Psammina tropica =

Scientific classification
- Kingdom: Fungi
- Division: Ascomycota
- Class: incertae sedis
- Order: incertae sedis
- Family: incertae sedis
- Genus: Psammina
- Species: P. tropica

Binomial name
- Psammina tropica Aptroot & M.Cáceres (2016)
- Holotype: Amapá National Forest, Brazil

Species of lichen

Psammina tropica is a species of corticolous (bark-dwelling) crustose lichen of uncertain classification in the Ascomycota. This lichen was discovered in 2016 growing on tree bark in disturbed forests of the Brazilian Amazon, with specimens found in both Amapá and Rondônia states. It is distinguished by its unique star-shaped reproductive structures that have 3–6 arms, each made up of several cells, which help identify it from related species.

== Taxonomy ==
Psammina tropica was described as new to science in 2016 by André Aptroot and Marcela da Silva Cáceres from material collected in the Amapá National Forest (Brazilian Amazon). The holotype was gathered on tree bark in disturbed forest near the field station at about 30 m elevation; paratypes came from Rondônia (primary rainforest near Fazenda São Francisco off BR-319, and a forest remnant on the Federal University of Rondônia campus near Porto Velho, both around 100 m). The specific epithet refers to its occurrence in the tropics. Species of Psammina can be lichenicolous or lichen-forming; P. tropica differs from the other lichenized species, P. palmata, by having septate, palmate conidia (3–6 arms, each with 4–7 cells) and a comparatively large, corticate thallus with a sterile zone around its edges.

== Description ==
The thallus forms patches up to about 4 cm across; it is corticate, smooth, dull, continuous, thin, and olive gray, and is bordered by a whitish hyphal prothallus up to about 1 mm wide. The photobiont is trentepohlioid. Ascomata were not observed. Sporodochia are abundant over the thallus center but absent from a 1–2 mm marginal zone; they are whitish gray, irregular to rounded, 0.1–0.3 mm in diameter, and only about 15 μm high. Conidia are hyaline and palmate, with 3–6 arms that are each 4–7-celled; conidia are about 20–25 μm in diameter (individual cells ~2.5–3.0 μm). P. tropica is unreactive with standard spot tests; thin-layer chromatography detected no lichen substances.

== Habitat and distribution ==
Psammina tropica grows on tree bark in disturbed forest. It is known only from Brazil, with collections from Amapá (type locality in the Amapá National Forest) and Rondônia (near and in Porto Velho), at roughly 30–100 m elevation. No additional Brazilian locations have been reported as of 2025.
