= Didymosphaeria =

Scientific classification
- Kingdom: Fungi
- Division: Ascomycota
- Class: Dothideomycetes
- Order: Pleosporales
- Family: Didymosphaeriaceae
- Genus: Didymosphaeria; Fuckel (1870)

Type species
- Didymosphaeria epidermidis (Fr.) Fuckel (1870)

Genus of fungi

Didymosphaeria is a genus of fungi in the family Didymosphaeriaceae.

== Species ==
As accepted by Species Fungorum;

- Didymosphaeria abutilonis M.T. Lucas & Sousa da Câmara (1952)
- Didymosphaeria acaciae Tilak (1967)
- Didymosphaeria aeluropodis Lobik (1928)
- Didymosphaeria ailanthi Srinivas. (1971)
- Didymosphaeria alhagi Szemb. (1915)
- Didymosphaeria althaeina Teng (1934)
- Didymosphaeria anaxaea Sacc. (1875)
- Didymosphaeria anisomera Sacc. (1916)
- Didymosphaeria annonae (Tilak, S.B. Kale & S.V.S. Kale) A. Pande (2008)
- Didymosphaeria araucana (Speg.) Sacc. & Trotter (1913)
- Didymosphaeria araucariae Sousa da Câmara (1929)
- Didymosphaeria arenariae Mouton (1889)
- Didymosphaeria astragalina Petr. (1944)
- Didymosphaeria astrocaryi Höhn. (1910)
- Didymosphaeria atropunctata Tochinai & Yamagiwa (1934)
- Didymosphaeria aurantifolii Somani (1980)
- Didymosphaeria bambusicola Höhn. (1907)
- Didymosphaeria berberidicola (Rehm) You Z. Wang, Aptroot & K.D. Hyde (2004)
- Didymosphaeria berberidis Domashova (1960)
- Didymosphaeria bethelii Cockerell (1908)
- Didymosphaeria bisphaerica (Cooke & Ellis) Scheinpflug (1958)
- Didymosphaeria blumeae Rehm (1913)
- Didymosphaeria boldoae Speg. (1910)
- Didymosphaeria borgii Caruana-Gatto & Sacc. (1915)
- Didymosphaeria brasiliensis (Höhn.) E. Müll. (1962)
- Didymosphaeria caesalpiniae R. Rao (1970)
- Didymosphaeria caespitulosa Sacc. (1915)
- Didymosphaeria cajani Gaikwad (1973)
- Didymosphaeria calamagrostidis Lobik (1928)
- Didymosphaeria calamicola Aptroot, J. Fröhl. & K.D. Hyde (1999)
- Didymosphaeria calopogonii Cif. & Gonz. Frag. (1928)
- Didymosphaeria calyciospora (A. Massal.) D. Hawksw. (1985)
- Didymosphaeria canariensis Petr. (1928)
- Didymosphaeria casalii Scheinpflug (1958)
- Didymosphaeria casuarinae Wehm. & S. Ahmad (1964)
- Didymosphaeria catalpae J.B. Parker (1909)
- Didymosphaeria celata (Curr.) Sacc. (1882)
- Didymosphaeria cephalariae A.L. Guyot (1949)
- Didymosphaeria chionanthi J.H. Mill. & G.E. Thomps. (1940)
- Didymosphaeria clavata Du Plessis (1933)
- Didymosphaeria clementsii Sacc. & D. Sacc. (1903)
- Didymosphaeria coccifera Vain. (1921)
- Didymosphaeria cocconiae Arx (1959)
- Didymosphaeria cocois-capitatae Caball. (1941)
- Didymosphaeria coffeicola Speg. (1909)
- Didymosphaeria congruella (P. Karst.) You Z. Wang, Aptroot & K.D. Hyde (2004)
- Didymosphaeria conoidea Niessl (1875)
- Didymosphaeria conoidella Sacc. & Berl. (1885)
- Didymosphaeria cornicola Naumov & Czerepan. (1952)
- Didymosphaeria coryneliae Spooner (1985)
- Didymosphaeria costata Duvernoy & Maire (1922)
- Didymosphaeria coumarounae Gonz. Frag. & Cif. (1928)
- Didymosphaeria crastophila Niessl (1883)
- Didymosphaeria cryptosphaerioides Rehm (1904)
- Didymosphaeria culmicola E. Müll. & S. Ahmad (1959)
- Didymosphaeria cypericola Henn. (1904)
- Didymosphaeria dactylidis Lobik (1928)
- Didymosphaeria decolorans Rehm (1898)
- Didymosphaeria destruens Rehm (1901)
- Didymosphaeria detincta (Müll. Arg.) Vain. (1915)
- Didymosphaeria dianellae I. Hino & Katum. (1964)
- Didymosphaeria dimastospora Sousa da Câmara (1951)
- Didymosphaeria diplodioides Sacc. (1882)
- Didymosphaeria dochmia (Berk. & Broome) Sacc. (1882)
- Didymosphaeria durantae Srinivas. (1971)
- Didymosphaeria echinospora Faurel & Schotter (1958)
- Didymosphaeria elaeagni Potebnia (1912)
- Didymosphaeria elbursensis Petr. (1940)
- Didymosphaeria eleutherococci Lar.N. Vassiljeva (1998)
- Didymosphaeria enormis Grove (1930)
- Didymosphaeria ephedricola Frolov (1970)
- Didymosphaeria epicallopisma (Wedd.) Sacc. & D. Sacc. (1905)
- Didymosphaeria epidermidis (Fr.) Fuckel (1870)
- Didymosphaeria equiseti-hiemalis P. Larsen & Munk (1952)
- Didymosphaeria erythrophlei Tassi (1900)
- Didymosphaeria eucalyptina Sacc. (1915)
- Didymosphaeria eugeniicola Speg. (1910)
- Didymosphaeria euphorbiae Parisi (1922)
- Didymosphaeria eutypae Sureya (1911)
- Didymosphaeria feltgenii Syd. & P. Syd. (1903)
- Didymosphaeria futilis (Berk. & Broome) Rehm (1879)
- Didymosphaeria geminella Lettau (1958)
- Didymosphaeria gouaniae Gonz. Frag. & Cif. (1926)
- Didymosphaeria gregaria Speg. (1881)
- Didymosphaeria halimi Gonz. Frag. & Cif. (1925)
- Didymosphaeria halimodendri Murashk. (1924)
- Didymosphaeria heppii Petr. (1938)
- Didymosphaeria hippophaes Rehm (1903)
- Didymosphaeria housei Dearn. (1916)
- Didymosphaeria idaei Feltgen (1901)
- Didymosphaeria inconspicua Rehm (1916)
- Didymosphaeria indica Scheinpflug (1958)
- Didymosphaeria infossa Sacc. (1921)
- Didymosphaeria insularis Sacc. (1915)
- Didymosphaeria iranica Petr. (1965)
- Didymosphaeria johansenii Dearn. (1923)
- Didymosphaeria kuttlingeriae C.W. Dodge (1948)
- Didymosphaeria larsenii Munk (1957)
- Didymosphaeria latebrosa Mouton (1900)
- Didymosphaeria leptitana Trotter (1916)
- Didymosphaeria lignicola Feltgen (1901)
- Didymosphaeria lignomaris Strongman & J.D. Mill. (1986)
- Didymosphaeria linderae Sacc. (1914)
- Didymosphaeria lineatispora Nograsek (1991)
- Didymosphaeria loliina Punith. (1979)
- Didymosphaeria lonavalensis Sathe & K.M. Mogarkar (1978)
- Didymosphaeria lonicerae-ripariae Fairm. (1922)
- Didymosphaeria ludens (Schulzer) Sacc. & Traverso (1910)
- Didymosphaeria macquariensis C.W. Dodge (1948)
- Didymosphaeria macrosporella (Höhn.) Sacc. (1928)
- Didymosphaeria maculans Vouaux (1911)
- Didymosphaeria magnoliae J.H. Mill. & G.E. Thomps. (1940)
- Didymosphaeria malloti C. Ramesh (1991)
- Didymosphaeria massarioides Sacc. & Brunaud (1882)
- Didymosphaeria maydis Saccas (1951)
- Didymosphaeria meningiensis Hansf. (1957)
- Didymosphaeria minima Feltgen (1903)
- Didymosphaeria minuta Niessl (1874)
- Didymosphaeria minutelloides Rehm (1913)
- Didymosphaeria monospermae S.M. Reddy (1974)
- Didymosphaeria moravica Rehm (1912)
- Didymosphaeria moricola Subhedar & V.G. Rao (1977)
- Didymosphaeria muelleri Mukerji & S. Kapoor (1969)
- Didymosphaeria munkiana Tilak & Jadhav (1972)
- Didymosphaeria napelli Kirschst. (1935)
- Didymosphaeria nuciseda Fairm. (1921)
- Didymosphaeria oblitescens (Berk. & Broome) Fuckel (1871)
- Didymosphaeria oliveirana Dias, M.T. Lucas, A.T. Vasconc. & Sousa da Câmara (1953)
- Didymosphaeria oregonensis Goodd. (1930)
- Didymosphaeria ostiolata Kirschst. (1935)
- Didymosphaeria otthiiformis Kravtzev (1955)
- Didymosphaeria paeoniae Sandu (1962)
- Didymosphaeria palaquii Vain. (1921)
- Didymosphaeria panici Marchal & Steyaert (1929)
- Didymosphaeria paraensis Bat. & A.A. Silva (1964)
- Didymosphaeria pellax (Nyl.) Sacc. & D. Sacc. (1905)
- Didymosphaeria perexigua Sacc. (1907)
- Didymosphaeria philippina Vain. (1921)
- Didymosphaeria placodiorum Vain. (1903)
- Didymosphaeria polyspora Cant. (1949)
- Didymosphaeria prosopidis Bubák (1914)
- Didymosphaeria pseudocarpa (Nyl.) Sacc. & D. Sacc. (1905)
- Didymosphaeria pterocarpi J.M. Yen (1980)
- Didymosphaeria punjabensis Wehm. (1963)
- Didymosphaeria pustulata I. Hino & Katum. (1960)
- Didymosphaeria pustulicola Rehm (1901)
- Didymosphaeria puyae (Speg.) Sacc. & Trotter (1913)
- Didymosphaeria radicicola Saccas (1954)
- Didymosphaeria rafniae Verwoerd & Du Plessis (1932)
- Didymosphaeria rhododendri Oudem. (1901)
- Didymosphaeria rhois Feltgen (1903)
- Didymosphaeria rubicola Berl. (1886)
- Didymosphaeria rubi-ulmifolii Ariyaw., Camporesi & K.D. Hyde (2014)
- Didymosphaeria saccharicola Speg. (1909)
- Didymosphaeria sagarii Narendra & V.G. Rao (1976)
- Didymosphaeria sarcococcae Scheinpflug (1958)
- Didymosphaeria saxauli Kravtzev (1955)
- Didymosphaeria schizostachyi (Rehm) You Z. Wang, Aptroot & K.D. Hyde (2004)
- Didymosphaeria scrophulariae Parisi (1928)
- Didymosphaeria sequoiae Gucevič (1957)
- Didymosphaeria shirkolaensis C. Ramesh (1991)
- Didymosphaeria sordidissima Speg. (1909)
- Didymosphaeria spegazzinii Sacc. & P. Syd. (1902)
- Didymosphaeria spilogena Sacc. (1915)
- Didymosphaeria spinosa E. Müll. & S. Ahmad (1959)
- Didymosphaeria stellariae Höhn. (1902)
- Didymosphaeria stipae A.L. Guyot (1958)
- Didymosphaeria stowardii Sacc. (1915)
- Didymosphaeria strelitziae Tassi (1900)
- Didymosphaeria striatospora Syd. & P. Syd. (1913)
- Didymosphaeria striatula Penz. & Sacc. (1902)
- Didymosphaeria strychnotis S.M. Lin & P.K. Chi (1994)
- Didymosphaeria subcorticalis Feltgen (1901)
- Didymosphaeria symica Petr. (1942)
- Didymosphaeria syringae Fabre (1879)
- Didymosphaeria taiwanensis W.Y. Yen & C.C. Chi (1954)
- Didymosphaeria tamaricis Koshk. & Frolov (1970)
- Didymosphaeria tenebrosa (Berk. & Broome) Sacc. (1882)
- Didymosphaeria tetraplodontis Lebedeva (1924)
- Didymosphaeria thalictri Ellis & Dearn. (1897)
- Didymosphaeria theae Petch (1925)
- Didymosphaeria thelenoides Vain. (1915)
- Didymosphaeria theodulina Unamuno (1929)
- Didymosphaeria trichostigmae Chardón (1946)
- Didymosphaeria vaitarnensis C. Ramesh (1991)
- Didymosphaeria variabile (Riccioni, Damm, Verkley & Crous) Ariyaw. & K.D. Hyde (2014)
- Didymosphaeria verdonii A.L. Guyot (1949)
- Didymosphaeria viciae Tomilin (1961)
- Didymosphaeria victoriensis Sacc. (1906)
- Didymosphaeria vincae M.T. Lucas & Sousa da Câmara (1955)
- Didymosphaeria werthiana Henn. (1906)
- Didymosphaeria wikstroemiae Petr. (1953)
- Didymosphaeria wulfii Lind (1924)
- Didymosphaeria yerbae Speg. (1908)
- Didymosphaeria zhukovskii Gucevič (1967)
