= Chaetomastia =

Scientific classification
- Kingdom: Fungi
- Division: Ascomycota
- Class: Dothideomycetes
- Order: Pleosporales
- Family: Teichosporaceae
- Genus: Chaetomastia (Sacc.) Berl

Type species
- Chaetomastia hirtula (P. Karst.) Berl.

Genus of fungi

Chaetomastia is a genus of fungi in the family Teichosporaceae.

== Species ==
As accepted by Species Fungorum;

- Chaetomastia cactorum (Earle) M.E. Barr & Boise (2002)
- Chaetomastia clavigera (Cooke & Ellis) Huhndorf (1996)
- Chaetomastia consimilis (Ellis & Everh.) Huhndorf (1996)
- Chaetomastia equiseti M.E. Barr (1989)
- Chaetomastia hirtula (P. Karst.) Berl. (1890)
- Chaetomastia littoralis M.E. Barr (1993)
- Chaetomastia phaeospora (E. Müll.) M.E. Barr (1989)
- Chaetomastia sambuci (Earle) M.E. Barr (1989)
- Chaetomastia sambucina (Ellis & Everh.) M.E. Barr (1989)
- Chaetomastia scelesta (Cooke & Ellis) M.E. Barr (1993)

Former species;

- C. clavispora (Cooke & Peck) M.E. Barr (1989) = Massariosphaeria clavispora, Thyridariaceae
- C. pilosella (P. Karst.) Berlese (1890) = Capronia pilosella, Herpotrichiellaceae
- C. typhicola (P. Karst.) M.E. Barr (1989) = Aquimassariosphaeria typhicola, Lindgomycetaceae
