= Hermann Schacht =

German botanist

Hermann Schacht (15 July 1814, in Ochsenwerder – 20 August 1864, in Bonn) was a German pharmacist and botanist, who specialized in the fields of plant anatomy and embryology.

Prior to 1847 he worked at pharmacies in Braunschweig, Hamburg, Emmerich, Aachen and Altona, where he worked closely with hepaticologist Carl Moritz Gottsche. In the meantime, he attended classes at the University of Jena (1841–42), where from 1847 he served as assistant to Matthias Jakob Schleiden.

In 1850 he obtained his PhD from Jena, and subsequently moved to Berlin, where in 1853–60 he worked as a university lecturer. Because of health problems he spent two years in Madeira (1855–57), conducting investigations of the island's flora during his convalescence. From 1860 to 1864 he was a professor of botany and director of the botanical garden at the University of Bonn.

In 1859 Gustav Karl Wilhelm Hermann Karsten named the plant genus Schachtia (family Rubiaceae) in his honor.

== Selected work ==
His book, Das Mikroskop und seine Anwendung insbesondere für Pflanzen-Anatomie und Physiologie (1851), was later translated by Frederick Currey into English and published as The microscope, and its application to vegetable anatomy and physiology (1855). His other noted written efforts include:

- Entwicklungs-Geschichte des Pflanzen-Embryen, 1850 – Developmental history of plant embryos.
- Physiologische Botanik, 1852 – Physiological botany.
- Der Baum: Studien über Bau und Leben der höheren Gewächse, 1853 – The tree: studies on the structure and life of higher plants.
- Lehrbuch der Anatomie und Physiologie der Gewächse, (2 volumes, 1856–59) – Textbook of plant anatomy and physiology.
- Madeira und Tenerife mit ihrer Vegetation, 1859 – Madeira and Tenerife; their vegetation.
- Die Spermatozoiden im Pflanzenreich, 1864 – The spermatozoid in the plant kingdom.
