= Appendispora =

Scientific classification
- Kingdom: Fungi
- Division: Ascomycota
- Class: Dothideomycetes
- Order: Pleosporales
- Family: Roussoellaceae
- Genus: Appendispora; K.D. Hyde

Type species
- Appendispora frondicola K.D. Hyde

Genus of fungi

Appendispora is a genus of fungi in the family Roussoellaceae. It was formerly in family Didymosphaeriaceae.

== Species ==
As accepted by Species Fungorum;

- Appendispora australiensis J. Fröhl. & K.D. Hyde (1999)
- Appendispora frondicola K.D. Hyde (1994)
