= Camille Montagne =

French military physician and botanist (1784-1866)

Jean Pierre François Camille Montagne
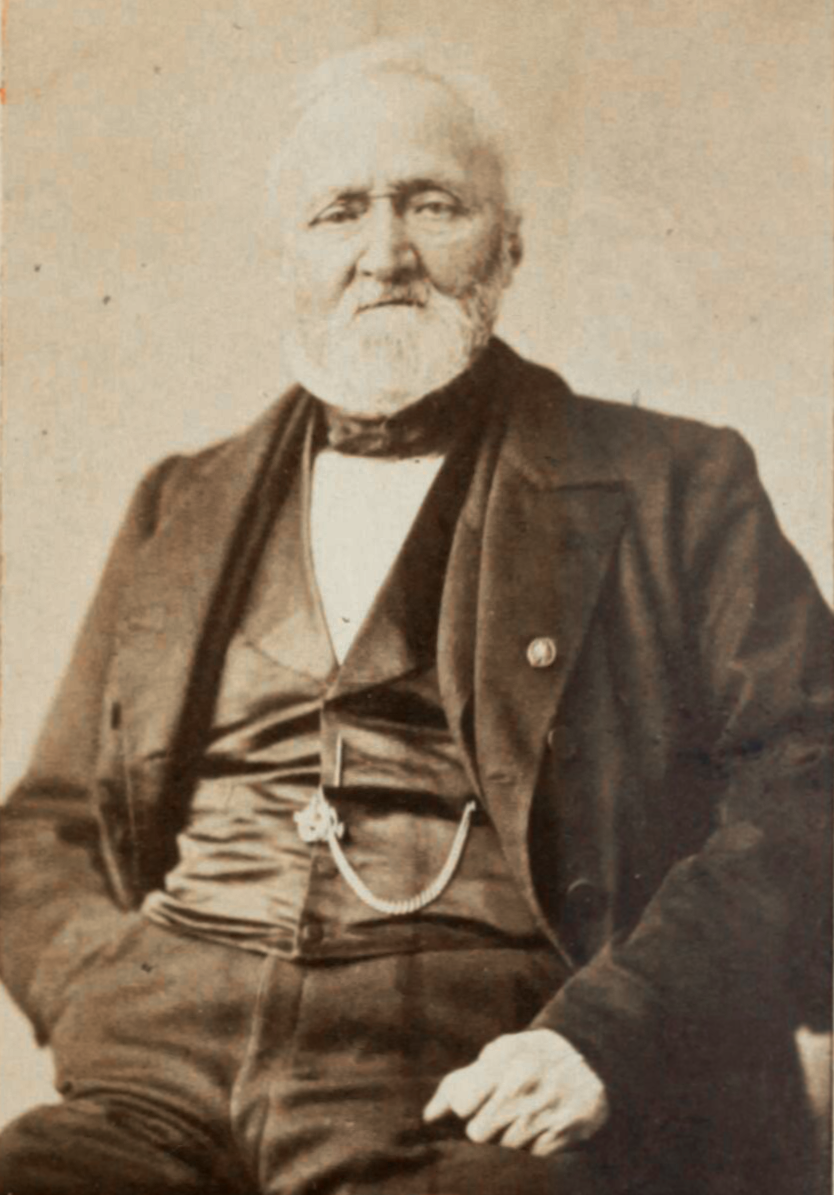
- Born: February 15, 1784; Vaudoy-en-Brie, Seine-et-Marne, France
- Died: December 5, 1866 (aged 82); Paris, France
- Occupations: military physician botanist

Jean Pierre François Camille Montagne (15 February 1784 – 5 December 1866) was a French military physician and botanist who specialized in the fields of bryology and mycology.

== Life ==
Montague was born in the commune of Vaudoy in the department of Seine-et-Marne, France.

At the age of 14, Montagne joined the French navy, and took part in Napoleon's invasion of Egypt. In 1802, he returned to France to study medicine, and two years later became a military surgeon.

== Career in botany ==
In 1832, at the age of 48 he retired from military service to concentrate on the study of cryptogams (mosses, algae, lichens and fungi). In 1853, he was elected a member of the Académie des sciences.

In 1845, he was one of the first scientists (with Marie-Anne Libert) to provide a description of Phytophthora infestans, a potato blight fungus he referred to as Botrytis infestans. Montagne is also known for investigations of mycological species native to Guyane.

He contributed numerous articles to the Archives de Botanique and the Annales des Sciences naturelles.

The fungal genera Montagnaea (DC., 1835) and Montagnites (Fr.) commemorate his name.

Also genera Montagnula Berl., 1896, Montagnina Höhn. 1910, Montagnellina Höhn. 1912 and Camontagnea Pujals, 1981 were named in his honour.

== Death ==
He died in Paris on 5 December 1866.

== See also ==
- Category:Taxa named by Camille Montagne
