= Sinodidymella =

Scientific classification
- Kingdom: Fungi
- Division: Ascomycota
- Class: Dothideomycetes
- Order: Pleosporales
- Family: Teichosporaceae
- Genus: Sinodidymella; J.Z. Yue & O.E. Erikss

Type species
- Sinodidymella verrucosa (Petr.) J.Z. Yue & O.E. Erikss.

Genus of fungi

Sinodidymella is a genus of fungi in the family Teichosporaceae.

== Species ==
As accepted by Species Fungorum;

- Sinodidymella americana M.E. Barr (2002)
- Sinodidymella hesperia M.E. Barr (2002)
- Sinodidymella occidentalis M.E. Barr (1993)
- Sinodidymella utahensis (Petr.) M.E. Barr (2002)
- Sinodidymella verrucosa (Petr.) J.Z. Yue & O.E. Erikss. (1985)
