= Loculohypoxylon =

Scientific classification
- Kingdom: Fungi
- Division: Ascomycota
- Class: Dothideomycetes
- Order: Pleosporales
- Family: Teichosporaceae
- Genus: Loculohypoxylon; M.E. Barr

Type species
- Loculohypoxylon grandineum (Berk. & Ravenel) M.E. Barr

Synonyms
- Diatrype grandinea Berk. & Ravenel, Grevillea 4(no. 31): 95 (1876); Anthostoma grandineum (Berk. & Ravenel) Sacc., Syll. fung. (Abellini) 1: 299 (1882); Camarops grandinea (Berk. & Ravenel) Cooke, Grevillea 13(no. 68): 108 (1885); Hypoxylon grandineum (Berk. & Ravenel) J.H. Mill., Mycologia 33(1): 74 (1941); Biscogniauxia grandinea (Berk. & Ravenel) Lar.N. Vassiljeva, Nizshie Rasteniya, Griby i Mokhoobraznye Dalnego Vostoka Rossii, Griby. Tom 4. Pirenomitsety i Lokuloaskomitsety (Sankt-Peterburg): 81 (1998)

Genus of fungi

Loculohypoxylon is a genus of fungi in the family Teichosporaceae. This is a monotypic genus, containing the single species Loculohypoxylon grandineum. It was published in Mycotaxon vol.3 (3) on page 326 in 1976.
