= Marietta Hannon Rousseau =

Belgian mycologist (1850–1926)

Mariette Hannon Rousseau
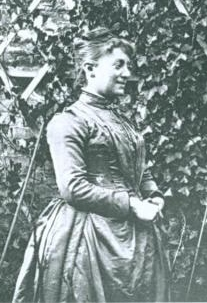
- Born: 20 March 1850; Ixelles, Belgium
- Died: 14 January 1926 (aged 75)
- Scientific career
- Fields: Botany, mycology

Marietta Hannon Rousseau, also known as Mariette Rousseau (1850–1926), was a Belgian mycologist and taxonomist specializing in cryptogamic plants and fungi. She published several works on fungi from 1879 to 1905 with Elisa Caroline Bommer, focusing primarily on Belgium.

== Biography ==
=== Youth and marriage ===
Marietta was born on 20 March 1850 to Joseph Hannon, a professor of zoology and comparative anatomy at Brussels University. Her father started teaching her about plants when she was young, although the rest of her education is not known. Her knowledge of mycology was self-taught. In 1871 she married Ernest Rousseau, a friend of her fathers and also a professor at the university. They had at least one child, Ernest Rousseau, who was the first president of Les Naturalistes Belges.

=== Botanical career ===
In 1873 she met Elisa Caroline Bommer, who was also interested in botany. Marietta said of Elisa: "The conformity of our tastes, the similarity of certain aspects of our characters, formed the basis of a complete agreement and a collaboration whose activity could never be slowed down." Bommer's husband Jean-Edouard Bommer suggested the two friends study the local fungi. The two published a series of works in the Bulletin de la Société Royale de Botanique de Belgique from 1879. Together they published a paper on Costa Rican fungi focused on with material collected from 1887 by Henri François Pittier, from which they discovered several new species. They also produced a report in 1905 on the fungi of Antarctica collected by the 1897–99 Belgian expedition led by Adrien de Gerlache de Gomery.

Beginning in 1908, Marietta's main focus was on curating the mushroom collection at the Jardin Botanique in Brussels. There, she also put together public exhibits of mushrooms and answered questions about fungi. After Elisa Bommer died in 1910, Marietta was not longer involved in active collecting, but she still led naturalist excursions in Brussels and the surrounding countryside.

In 1924 she received the honor of Knight of the Order of Leopold. She was friends with the artist James Ensor with whom she corresponded, and she appeared occasionally as the subject of his paintings and sketches. The genus of Roussoella was named after her by Italian mycologist Pier Andrea Saccardo. The genus Roussoellopsis was also named after her.

Her herbarium and types are in the BR Herbarium Catalogue, located at the Meise Botanic Garden. Her other materials can be found at the Plant Pathology Herbarium at Cornell University and the US National Fungus Collection.

== Selected list of publications ==
List from Maroske and May:

Bommer E, Rousseau M (1879). Catalogue des champignons observé aux environs de Bruxelles. Bulletin de la Société Royale de Botanique de Belgique18(3): 61–219 [reprinted, TL-2 627].
Bommer E, Rousseau M (1884). Florule mycologique des environs de Bruxelles. Bulletin de la Société Royale de Botanique de Belgique 23(1): 13–365 [reprinted, TL-2 628].
Bommer E, Rousseau M (1886). Contributions à la flore mycologique de Belgique. Bulletin de la Société Royale de Botanique de Belgique 25(1): 13–365.
Bommer E, Rousseau M (1887). Contributions à la flore mycologique de Belgique, II. Bulletin de la Société Royale de Botanique de Belgique 26(1): 187–241.
Bommer E, Rousseau M (1890). Contributions à la Flore Mycologique de Belgique, III. Bulletin de la Société Royale de Botanique de Belgique 29(1): 205–302.
Bommer E, Rousseau M (1896). Primitiae Florae Costaericensis par Th. Durand et H. Pittier. Troisième fasicule. Fungi. Bulletin de la Société Royale de Botanique de Belgique 35: 151–166.
Bommer E & Rousseau M (1905). Champignons. Résultats Voyage du S. Y. Belgica en 1897–1898–1899 ... Rapports scientifiques .... 6: 1–15, pl. 1–5.
