= Rhytidiella =

Scientific classification
- Kingdom: Fungi
- Division: Ascomycota
- Class: Dothideomycetes
- Order: Pleosporales
- Family: Cucurbitariaceae
- Genus: Rhytidiella; Zalasky

Type species
- Rhytidiella moriformis Zalasky

Genus of fungi

Rhytidiella is a genus of fungi in the family Cucurbitariaceae. According to the 2007 Outline of Ascomycota, the placement of the genus in this family in uncertain.
