= Karstenula =

Scientific classification
- Kingdom: Fungi
- Division: Ascomycota
- Class: Dothideomycetes
- Order: Pleosporales
- Family: Didymosphaeriaceae
- Genus: Karstenula; Speg.

Genus of fungi

Karstenula is a genus of fungi in the family Didymosphaeriaceae.
