= Bertiella (fungus) =

Scientific classification
- Kingdom: Fungi
- Division: Ascomycota
- Class: Dothideomycetes
- Order: Pleosporales
- Family: Teichosporaceae
- Genus: Bertiella (Sacc.) Sacc. & P. Syd.

Type species
- Bertiella polyspora Kirschst.

Genus of fungi

Bertiella is a genus of fungi in the family Teichosporaceae. although Wijayawardene et al. 2020 places it within the Melanommataceae family.

The genus name of Bertiella is in honour of Giuseppe Berti, an Italian agricultural engineer from Porto Maurizio.

== Species ==
As accepted by Species Fungorum;

- Bertiella botryosa Morgan (1904)
- Bertiella ellipsoidea Ekanayaka, Q. Zhao & K.D. Hyde (2016)
- Bertiella fici Tennakoon, C.H. Kuo & K.D. Hyde (2021)
- Bertiella gelatinosa D.A.C. Almeida, Gusmão & A.N. Mill. (2017)
- Bertiella rhodospila (Berk. & M.A. Curtis) M.E. Barr (1986)
- Bertiella striatispora Niranjan & V.V. Sarma (2019)

Former species;

- B. brenckleana Rehm (1911) = Rosenscheldia brenckleana, Botryosphaeriaceae
- B. macrospora (Sacc.) Sacc. & Traverso (1910) = Bertia macrospora, Bertiaceae
- B. polyspora Kirschst. (1906) = Kirschsteinia polyspora, Nitschkiaceae
