= Roussoëlla =

Scientific classification
- Domain: Eukaryota
- Kingdom: Fungi
- Division: Ascomycota
- Class: Dothideomycetes
- Order: Pleosporales
- Family: Roussoellaceae
- Genus: Roussoëlla; Sacc. (1888)

Type species
- Roussoella nitidula Sacc. & Paol. (1888)

Genus of fungi

Roussoëlla is a genus of fungi in the family Roussoellaceae. The genus is characterized by two-celled ascospores, unitunicate asci with a small spherical apical ring that stains slightly blue with Melzer's reagent, and stromata with several perithecia. The genus was circumscribed by Italian mycologist Pier Andrea Saccardo in 1888, with Roussoella nitidula assigned as the type species. The generic name honours Marietta Hannon Rousseau, (1850–1926), who was a Belgian mycologist and taxonomist.

Roussoellaceae was introduced by Liu et al. (2014) and contains three genera; Neoroussoella, Roussoella and Roussoellopsis.

== Species ==
- Roussoella aequatoriensis K.D.Hyde (1997)
- Roussoella alveolata Y.M.Ju, J.D.Rogers & Huhndorf (1996)
- Roussoella angusta D.Q.Dai & K.D.Hyde (2015)
- Roussoella angustispora D.Q.Zhou, L.Cai & K.D.Hyde (2003)
- Roussoella aquatica W.Dong, H.Zhang & K.D.Hyde (2020)
- Roussoella arundinacea Crous & R.K.Schumach. (2020)
- Roussoella bambusae (Pat.) M.Monod (1983)
- Roussoella calamicola J.Fröhl., K.D.Hyde & Aptroot (1999)
- Roussoella chiangraina Phook., Jian K.Liu & K.D.Hyde (2014)
- Roussoella chilensis (Speg.) Y.M.Ju, J.D.Rogers & Huhndorf (1996)
- Roussoella doimaesalongensis Thambug. & K.D.Hyde (2017)
- Roussoella donacicola (Speg.) Y.M.Ju, J.D.Rogers & Huhndorf (1996)
- Roussoella guttulata J.Y.Zhang, Y.Z.Lu & K.D.Hyde (2020)
- Roussoella hysterioides (Ces.) Höhn. (1919)
- Roussoella intermedia Y.M.Ju, J.D.Rogers & Huhndorf (1996)
- Roussoella japanensis Kaz.Tanaka, Jian K. Liu & K.D. Hyde (2014)
- Roussoella kunmingensis H.B.Jiang, Phookamsak & K.D. Hyde (2019)
- Roussoella magnata D.Q.Dai & K.D.Hyde (2015)
- Roussoella mexicana Crous & Yáñez-Moral. (2015)
- Roussoella minutella (Penz. & Sacc.) Aptroot (1995)
- Roussoella neopustulans D.Q.Dai, Jian K.Liu & K.D.Hyde (2014)
- Roussoella nitidula Sacc. & Paol. (1888)
- Roussoella palmicola J.Fröhl., K.D. Hyde & Aptroot (1999)
- Roussoella phyllostachydis (I.Hino & Katum.) I.Hino & Katum. (1965)
- Roussoella pseudohysterioides D.Q.Dai & K.D.Hyde (2016)
- Roussoella pustulans (Ellis & Everh.) Y.M.Ju, J.D.Rogers & Huhndorf (1996)
- Roussoella saltuensis K.D.Hyde (1997)
- Roussoella scabrispora (Höhn.) Aptroot (1995)
- Roussoella serrulata (Ellis & G.Martin) K.D.Hyde & Aptroot (1995)
- Roussoella siamensis Phook., Jian K.Liu & K.D.Hyde (2014)
- Roussoella thailandica D.Q.Dai, Jian K.Liu & K.D.Hyde (2014)
- Roussoella tuberculata D.Q.Dai & K.D.Hyde (2016)
- Roussoella verrucispora Kaz.Tanaka, Jian K.Liu & K.D.Hyde (2014)
- Roussoella verruculosa Cand. & Katum. (1986)
- Roussoella yunnanensis H.B.Jiang, Phookamsak & K.D.Hyde (2019)
