= Roussoellopsis =

Scientific classification
- Kingdom: Fungi
- Division: Ascomycota
- Class: Dothideomycetes
- Order: Pleosporales
- Family: Roussoellaceae
- Genus: Roussoellopsis; I. Hino & Katum.

Type species
- Roussoellopsis japonica (I. Hino & Katum.) I. Hino & Katum.

Genus of fungi

Roussoellopsis is a genus of fungi in the class Dothideomycetes and order Pleosporales, and family Roussoellaceae.

The genus was named after Marietta Hannon Rousseau (1850–1926), who was a Belgian mycologist and taxonomist.

The genus was circumscribed by Iwao Hino and Ken Katumoto in J. Jap. Bot. vol.40 on pages 85-86 in 1965.

== Species ==
- Roussoellopsis japonica (I. Hino & Katum.) I. Hino & Katum. (1965)
- Roussoellopsis macrospora (I. Hino & Katum.) I. Hino & Katum. (1965)
- Roussoellopsis tosaensis (I. Hino & Katum.) I. Hino & Katum. (1965)
