= Elise Caroline Bommer =

Belgian botanist

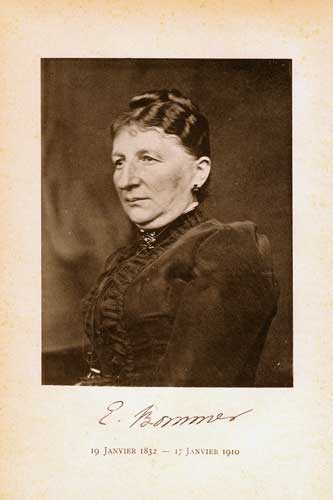

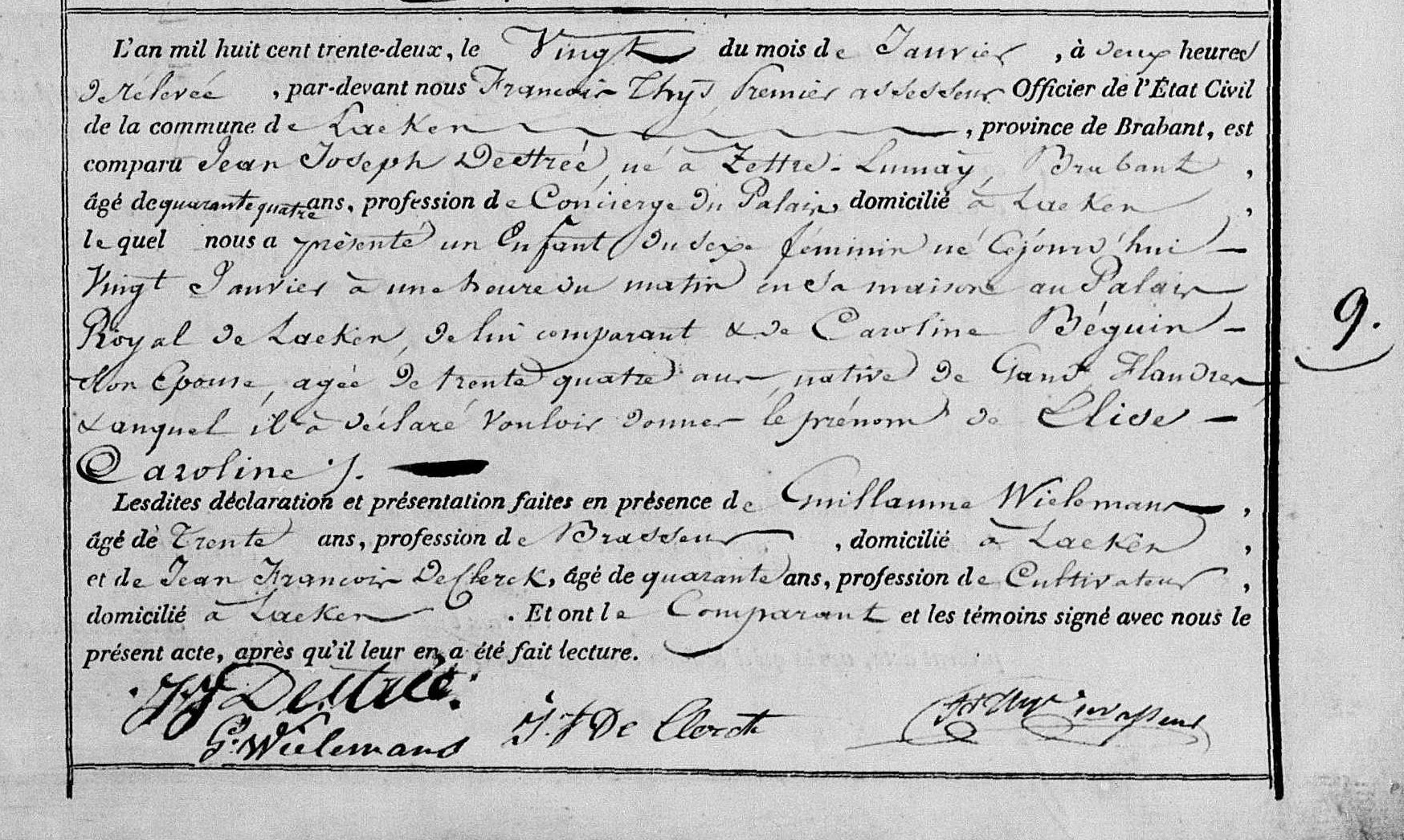
Birth record of Elise Caroline Destrée (1832)

Marriage record of Elise Caroline Destrée (1863)

Elise Caroline Bommer (calling name: Elisa), née Destrée (20 January 1832 in Laeken – 17 January 1910 in Brussels), was a Belgian botanist specialising in mycology, and was the wife of pteridologist and collector Jean-Édouard Bommer (1829–1895), who was professor of botany at University of Brussels in 1872. The standard author abbreviation E.Bommer is used to indicate this person as the author when citing a botanical name.

== Biography ==
=== Youth and marriage ===
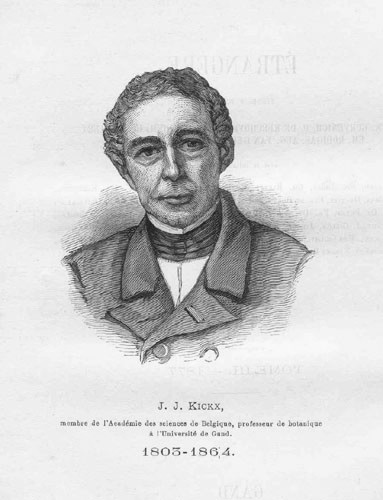
Jean Kickx

In Elisa's youth her father was employed at the Royal Castle of Laeken (the official residence of Belgian King), giving her the opportunity to explore the large grounds and park. A palace governess tutored her but when ten years old she was sent to a boarding school at nearby Vilvoorde, where she rued her loss of freedom, but finally adjusted to the new discipline and developed her talent for music. Her music was set aside in favour of a commercial career when she was twenty years old and her health soon suffered as a result of long hours spent at unfulfilling work. Knowing of her interest in botany, her family physician introduced her to Jean-Edouard Bommer, a botanist and fern specialist whom she married in 1863. One of their children, Charles (1866–1938), would later become a palaeobotanist.

=== Botanical career ===
Despite a growing and demanding family, Elisa was drawn further into the world of botany and total described more than 200 fungal species. In 1873 she met Mariette Rousseau who had similar interests and much of their work was produced together. Jean-Edouard Bommer suggested the two friends study the local fungi, virtually untouched except for the work of Marie-Anne Libert (1782–1865), Gérard Daniel Westendorp (1813–1869) and Jean Kickx (1803–1864). Making use of Kickx's Flore cryptogamique des environs de Louvaine and Flore cryptogamique des Flandres, and the Systema mycologicum of Elias Magnus Fries, they launched into an arduous and inspiring project. In this they were greatly helped by access to the library of the local Jardin Botanique.

A succession of monographs followed and were published in the Bulletin de la Société Royale de Botanique de Belgique in 1879, 1884, 1886 and 1890. Their joint paper on Costa Rican fungi appeared in 1896, and dealt with material collected from 1887 by Henri François Pittier. They also worked on the fungi collected by the 1897-99 Belgian expedition led by Adrien de Gerlache de Gomery to Antarctica, producing a report in 1905.

In her final years physical disability severely limited her activities, but never stopped her piano-playing, and embarked on
botanical painting, including fungi and flowering plants. On her death her mycological collection went to the Brussels Jardin Botanique and is currently housed at the herbarium in Meise.

She was commemorated in the genus Bommerella created by Élie Marchal (1839–1923).

== Selected publications ==
Partial list of publications:
Bommer E, Rousseau M (1879). Catalogue des champignons observé aux environs de Bruxelles. Bulletin de la Société Royale de Botanique de Belgique18(3): 61–219 [reprinted, TL-2 627].
Bommer E, Rousseau M (1884). Florule mycologique des environs de Bruxelles. Bulletin de la Société Royale de Botanique de Belgique 23(1): 13–365 [reprinted, TL-2 628].
Bommer E, Rousseau M (1886). Contributions à la flore mycologique de Belgique. Bulletin de la Société Royale de Botanique de Belgique 25(1): 13–365.
Bommer E, Rousseau M (1887). Contributions à la flore mycologique de Belgique, II. Bulletin de la Société Royale de Botanique de Belgique 26(1): 187–241.
Bommer E, Rousseau M (1890). Contributions à la Flore Mycologique de Belgique, III. Bulletin de la Société Royale de Botanique de Belgique 29(1): 205–302.
Bommer E, Rousseau M (1896). Primitiae Florae Costaericensis par Th. Durand et H. Pittier. Troisième fasicule. Fungi. Bulletin de la Société Royale de Botanique de Belgique 35: 151–166.
Bommer E & Rousseau M (1905). Champignons. Résultats Voyage du S. Y. Belgica en 1897–1898–1899 … Rapports scientifiques …. 6: 1–15, pl. 1–5. [TL-2 629]

== Sources ==
- Rousseau, M., “Necrologie Madame J. E. Bommer, nee Elisa Destrée”, in: Bulletin de la Société royale de Botanique de Belgique, 47 (1910), 256–261.
- CREESE, Mary, Ladies in the Laboratory II: West European Women in Science, 1800–1900: A Survey of Their Contributions to Research, Maryland, 2004, 104–105.
