= The Facts of Life (Darlington book) =

1953 book by C.D. Darlington

- First edition
- Author: C. D. Darlington
- Language: English
- Genre: Science
- Publisher: George Allen and Unwin
- Publication date: 1953

The Facts of Life is a book published in 1953 by C. D. Darlington of the subject of race, heredity and evolution. Darlington was a major contributor to the field of genetics around the time of the modern synthesis.
