= Philippe Vandermaelen =

Belgian geographer (1795–1869)

Philippe Vandermaelen (1795–1869) was a Belgian geographer.

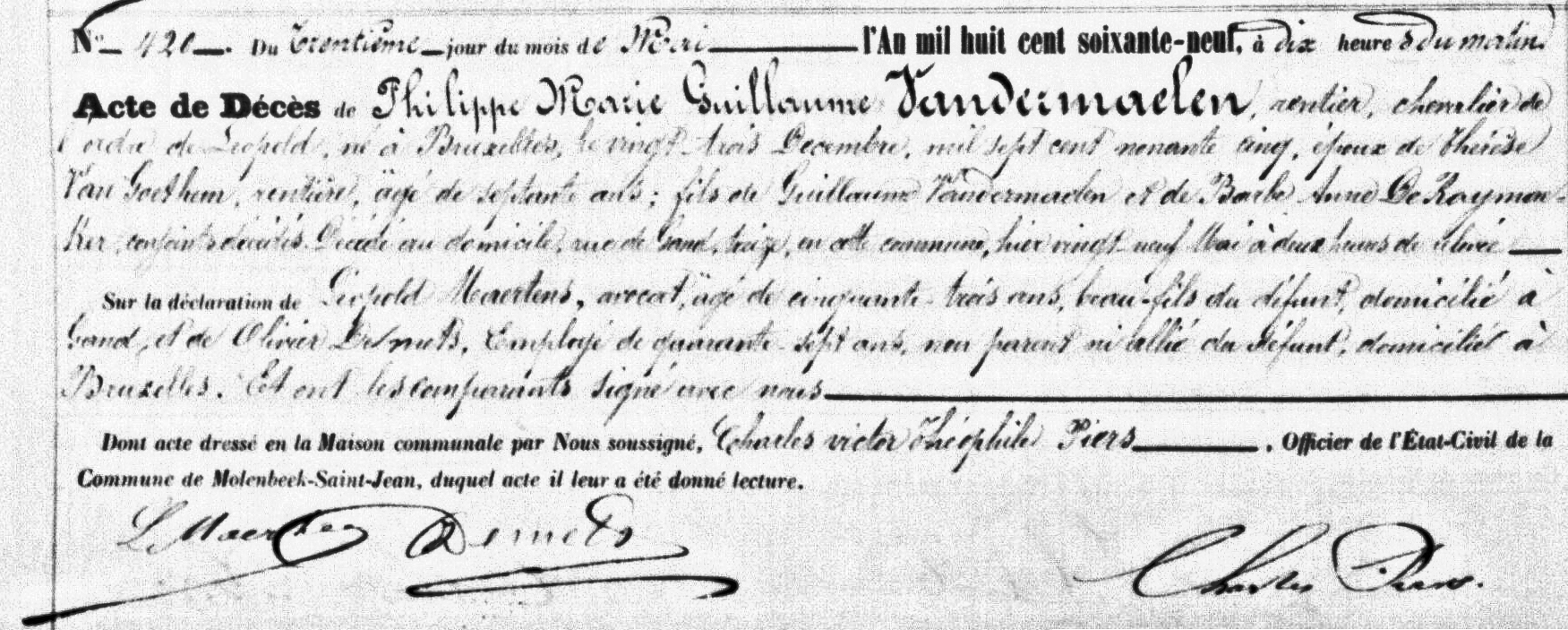
