= Pseudotrichia (fungus) =

Scientific classification
- Kingdom: Fungi
- Division: Ascomycota
- Class: Dothideomycetes
- Order: Pleosporales
- Family: Didymosphaeriaceae
- Genus: Pseudotrichia; Kirschst.

Genus of fungi

Pseudotrichia is a genus of fungi in the family Didymosphaeriaceae.
