= C. D. Darlington =

British biologist (1903–1981)

- Born: 19 December 1903; Chorley, Lancashire
- Died: 26 March 1981 (aged 77)
- Education: University of London
- Awards: Royal Medal (1946); Mendel Medal (1972)
- Scientific career
- Fields: Genetics, Botany, Cytology
- Author abbrev. (botany): C.D.Darl.

Cyril Dean Darlington FRS (19 December 1903 – 26 March 1981) was an English biologist, cytologist, geneticist, and eugenicist. He discovered the mechanics of chromosomal crossover, its role in inheritance, and thus its importance to evolution. He was the Sherardian Professor of Botany at the University of Oxford from 1953 to 1971.

Darlington's research on genetics contributed to the modern evolutionary synthesis in the 20th century. However, many of his views are controversial; Darlington was listed in 1999 by the Southern Poverty Law Center as an example of a prominent race scientist who espoused antisemitism, eugenics, racism, and social Darwinism.

== Biography ==
=== Early life ===
Cyril Darlington was born in Chorley, a small cotton town in Lancashire, England in 1903. He had one brother, six years older. His father, William, was a teacher at a small school. When Darlington was eight, the family moved to London. His childhood was an unhappy one, characterized by a stern, bitter, and frustrated father, who struggled against poverty. Darlington enjoyed neither sports nor studies (including at the Mercers' School and St Paul's School, London). He began to develop a disdain for authority. He decided to become a farmer in Australia, so he applied to the South Eastern Agricultural College at Wye, known later as Wye College. He was an indifferent student, but his social life took a turn for the better when he took up boxing, with moderate success. He was then six feet three inches tall, and an imposing figure. One subject that captured his imagination, however, was Mendelian genetics, taught by the myriapodologist Stanley Graham Brade-Birks. Darlington's interest in the subject began after he discovered Thomas Hunt Morgan's The Physical Basis of Heredity. He graduated with a London University Ordinary degree in 1923.

=== Early professional years ===
After being turned down for a scholarship to go to Trinidad as a farmer, Darlington was encouraged in 1923 by one of his professors to apply for a scholarship at the John Innes Horticultural Institution in Merton. He wrote to its director, William Bateson, famous for having introduced the word "genetics" into biology. His application was unsuccessful, but he obtained a temporary post as an unpaid technician. Bateson had just hired a cytologist, Frank Newton, who became a mentor to Darlington. Darlington published his first scientific paper on the tetraploidy of the sour cherry and was hired as a permanent employee.

Shortly after, both Bateson and Newton died within a year of each other and J.B.S. Haldane came to the Innes. Although neither an experimentalist nor cytologist, Haldane formed a close friendship with Darlington. He began to make contributions to the understanding of the relationship between chromosomal crossover and the events observed during meiosis.

In February 1929 he made a study trip with fellow botanist John Macqueen Cowan to the Near East. In 1931 he began writing the book Recent Advances in Cytology, which was published in 1932. He became Director of the Cytology Department in 1937, and he became director of the Innes two years later, 15 years after his arrival as an unpaid volunteer. He was elected a Fellow of the Royal Society on 20 March 1941. A few months after that, he was awarded the Royal Medal, and then was elected president of the Genetical Society. In 1947 he co-founded with Ronald Fisher the journal Heredity: An International Journal of Genetics, as a response to J.B.S. Haldane joining the Communist party and "taking the Journal of Genetics with him".

=== Later years ===
He left the Innes in 1953 and accepted the Sherardian Chair of Botany at Oxford University. He developed an interest in the Botanic Garden, going on to establish the 'Genetic Garden'. He was also involved in extending the teaching of science, especially genetics, in the university. He continued to voice support for the belief that human genetics determined behaviour.

In 1972 he, along with 50 other scientists, signed "Resolution on Scientific Freedom Regarding Human Behavior and Heredity" in which a genetic approach to understanding the behaviour of man was strongly defended. He staunchly defended his colleague, John Baker, who published the controversial book Race in 1974, in the fight against Lysenkoism. Asked by a reporter for The Sunday Times whether or not he was a racist for this connection to John Baker, who believed that no civilizations had ever arisen in Africa, all "negrids" had a "fetid smell" and were "less evolved," Darlington replied: "Well, I'm regarded as one by everyone except the Jews, who are racist, and who utterly agree with my views."

Darlington retired from his official position at the university in 1971, but remained in the university, writing and publishing his work. He died in Oxford in 1981. He had five children, two of whom committed suicide.

=== Sociobiology and the Lysenko Affair ===
In his later years, Darlington increased his participation in the public debate about the role of science in society, and especially its interaction with politics and government. Beginning in 1948, he published strong condemnations of the denouncement of Mendelian genetics in favour of Lysenkoism in the Soviet Union. Some genetics institutes were destroyed, and prominent geneticists were purged or murdered. These events caused an upheaval among the leaders of genetics in the west, many of whom were leftist, socialists, communists, and Marxists. This caused a break between Haldane and Darlington, who was intransigent in his anti-authoritarian views.

Darlington developed an interest in the application of genetic insights to the understanding of human history. He believed that not only were there differences in the character and culture between individuals, but that these differences also exist between races. To him, understanding of these differences in scientific terms was not only interesting in its own right, but was crucial to the development of a civil society. Darlington writes that "as slaves," enslaved diasporic Africans "improved in health and increased in numbers," without addressing the role of forced slave breeding in the United States. He repeated the myth that their environment was "more favorable than anything they had experienced in Africa." According to Darlington, emancipation of slaves resulted in the withdrawal of "discipline" and "protection" resulting in social problems such as "drugs, gambling, and prostitution."

Darlington concluded: "The intellectually well-endowed races, classes, and societies have a moral responsibility for the problems of race mixture, of immigration and exploitation, that have arisen from their exercise of economic and political power. They may hope to escape from these responsibilities by claiming an intellectual and, therefore, moral equality between all races, classes, and societies. But the chapters of this book, step by step, deprive them of the scientific and historical evidence that might support such a comfortable illusion."

Darlington was opposed to the UNESCO Statement of Race. He agreed with Darwin's classical view: "The races differ also in constitution, in acclimatization, and in liability to certain diseases. Their mental characteristics are likewise very distinct; chiefly as it would appear in their emotional, but partly in their intellectual, faculties." To simplify, Darlington believed that there is a difference not just in skin color and disease vulnerability between races, but also in intelligence.

Darlington thought that there might be a biological justification to prohibit interracial marriages "if intermarriage were not contrary to the habits of all stable communities and therefore in no need of discouragement." He refused to sign the revised 1951 statement which conceded that racial differences in intelligence possibly existed. Darlington's dissenting commentary was printed with the statement.

== Bibliography ==
(A partial list)

- Chromosomes and Plant Breeding, Macmillan (1932).
- Recent Advances in Cytology, Churchill (1932).
- Chromosome Atlas of Cultivated Plants, C D Darlington and E K Janaki Ammal (1945).
- The Facts of Life, George Allen and Unwin (1953).
- Darwin's Place in History, Blackwell (1959).
- Chromosome Botany and the Origins of Cultivated Plants, Hafner Pub. Co (1963).
- Genetics and Man. London: George Allen and Unwin. 1964 – via Internet Archive..
- Cytology, Churchill (1965).
- The Evolution of Man and Society. London: George Allen and Unwin. 1969. ISBN 0-04-575011-4 – via Internet Archive.
- The Little Universe of Man, George Allen and Unwin (1978) ISBN 0-04-570010-9.

== In popular culture ==
In the 2022 second season episode "The Primal Theory" of the animated series Primal, a fictionalised version of Darlington appears as a main character, voiced by Jeremy Crutchley.
