= Didymosphaeriaceae =

Scientific classification
- Kingdom: Fungi
- Division: Ascomycota
- Class: Dothideomycetes
- Order: Pleosporales
- Family: Didymosphaeriaceae; Munk (1953)

Type genus
- Didymosphaeria Fuckel (1870)

Genera
- See text

Family of fungi

The Didymosphaeriaceae are a family of fungi in the order Pleosporales. The family was erected by Anders Munk in 1953.

Taxa have a cosmopolitan distribution, and are saprobic in both woody and herbaceous plants. Some species are parasitic on other fungi. The validity of the family as a distinct taxonomic unit was questioned in a 2014 publication that suggested that the genera Appendispora, Phaeodothis, Roussoella, and Verruculina should be moved into other families.

The type genus is Didymosphaeria, circumscribed by Karl Wilhelm Gottlieb Leopold Fuckel in 1870.

== Genera ==
According to the 2022 version of Outline of Fungi and fungus-like taxa, the Didymosphaeriaceae contains 33 genera and about 254 species.

- Alloconiothyrium Verkley, Göker & Stielow (2014) – 1 sp.
- Austropleospora R.G.Shivas & L.Morin (2010) – 1 sp.
- Barria Z.Q.Yuan (1994) – 1 sp.
- Bimuria D.Hawksw., Chea & Sheridan (1979) – 1 sp.
- Chromolaenicola Mapook & K.D.Hyde (2020) – 6 spp.
- Curreya Sacc. (1883) – 2 spp.
- Cylindroaseptospora Jayasiri, E.B.G.Jones & K.D.Hyde (2019) – 2 spp.
- Deniquelata Ariyaw. & K.D.Hyde (2019) – 2 spp.
- Didymocrea Kowalski (1965) – 1 sp.
- Didymosphaeria Fuckel (1870) – ca. 25 spp.
- Kalmusia Niessl (1872) – 15 spp.
- Kalmusibambusa Phook., Tennakoon, Thambug. & K.D.Hyde (2017) – 1 sp.
- Karstenula Speg. (1879) – 16 spp.
- Laburnicola Wanas., Camporesi, E.B.G.Jones & K.D.Hyde (2016) – 4 spp.
- Letendraea Sacc. (1880) – ca. 3 spp.
- Lineostroma H.J.Swart (1988) – 1 sp.
- Montagnula Berl. (1896) – ca. 30 spp.
- Neokalmusia Ariyaw. & K.D.Hyde (2014) – 5 spp.
- Neptunomyces M.Gonçalves, T.Vicente & A.Alves (2019) – 1 sp.
- Paracamarosporium Wijayaw. & K.D.Hyde (2014) – 7 spp.
- Paraconiothyrium Verkley (2004) – 19 spp.
- Paramassariosphaeria Wanas., E.B.G.Jones & K.D.Hyde (2016) – 2 spp.
- Paraphaeosphaeria O.E.Erikss. (1967) – 33 spp.
- Phaeodothis Syd. & P.Syd. (1904) – 5 spp.
- Pseudocamarosporium Wijayaw. & K.D.Hyde (2014) – 13 spp.
- Pseudodidymocyrtis Flakus, Rodr.Flakus & Etayo (2019) – 1 sp.
- Pseudopithomyces Ariyaw. & K.D.Hyde (2015) – 10 spp.
- Pseudotrichia Kirschst. (1939) – ca. 8 spp.
- Spegazzinia Sacc. (1879) – ca. 30 spp.
- Tremateia Kohlm., Volkm.-Kohlm. & O.E.Erikss. (1995) – 3 spp.
- Verrucoconiothyrium Crous (2015) – 4 spp.
- Vicosamyces Firmino, A.R.Machado & O.L.Pereira (2019) – 1 sp.
- Xenocamarosporium Crous & M.J.Wingf. (2015) – 1 sp.
