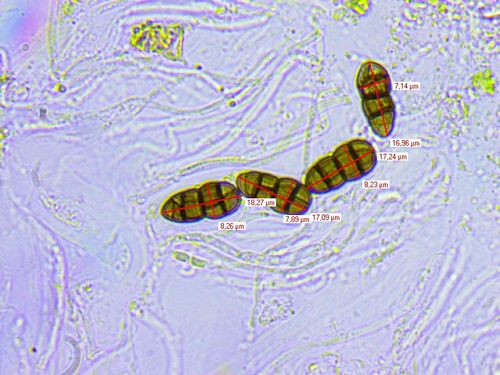
- Teichospora mariae

Scientific classification
- Kingdom: Fungi
- Division: Ascomycota
- Class: Dothideomycetes
- Order: Pleosporales
- Family: Teichosporaceae; M.E. Barr (2002)

Genera
- Bertiella; Chaetomastia; Immotthia; Loculohypoxylon; Sinodidymella; Teichospora

= Teichosporaceae =

Family of fungi

The Teichosporaceae are a family of fungi in the order Pleosporales.
