= Cucurbitariaceae =

Scientific classification
- Kingdom: Fungi
- Division: Ascomycota
- Class: Dothideomycetes
- Order: Pleosporales
- Family: Cucurbitariaceae; G. Winter (1885)

Genera
- Cucurbitaria; Curreya; Rhytidiella - uncertain Syncarpella

Family of fungi

The Cucurbitariaceae are a family of fungi in the order Pleosporales. Taxa are widespread in temperate regions and are necrotrophic or saprobic on woody plants.
