= Anders Munk =

Danish mycologist

Anders Munk (1922 in Kolding – June 1989 in Copenhagen) was a Danish mycologist. He was an expert of the fungal group colloquially known as the Pyrenomycetes, and best known for his 1957 work "Danish Pyrenomycetes".

== Biography ==
Munk's introduction to mycology was from Poul Larsen, who was previously a teacher and a former colleague of Munk's parents. Around that time Munk also made contact with biologist Øjvind Winge, who introduced Munk to the Pyrenomycetes, which were also his own main interest. Munk started studying botany at the University of Copenhagen in 1940. His interest in the fungi was further enhanced after reading John Axel Nannfeldt's 1932 work on the morphology and systematics of the discomycetes. Munk worked for some summers at the then-newly started Mols Laboratory of Natural History, where he increased his knowledge about the ecology of the Pyrenomycetes.

After graduating in 1946, Munk got a short-term job at Løvens Kemiske Fabrik (now LEO Pharma). He did not enjoy the work (manufacturing antibiotics), and shortly after started teaching at Th.Langs Skoler, a private school in Silkeborg. He continued his graduate studies in his spare time, and defended his doctoral dissertation in 1953. Apart from a short-term scholarship with Morten Lange in 1963, the rest of Munk's career was largely devoted to teaching.

Munk was married to Ruth, who he met as a fellow student at university, and with whom he had four children. He spent the last years of his life in pain from spondylosis of the cervical vertebrae.

== Eponymy ==
Several fungi have been named to honour Munk, including: Capronia munkii Unter. (1995); Endoxyla munkii Unter. 1993); Hypoxylon munkii Whalley, Hammelev & Talig. (1988); and Trichodelitschia munkii N.Lundq. (1964).

== Selected works ==
- Munk, Anders (1953). The System of the Pyrenomycetes. A Contribution to a Natural Classification of the Group Sphaeriales Sensu Lindau. Dansk Botanisk Arkiv. Vol. 15. Copenhagen: Munksgaard. pp. 1–163. OCLC 316806445.
- Munk, Anders (1957). Danish Pyrenomycetes: A Preliminary Flora. Dansk botanisk arkiv. Vol. 17. Copenhagen: Munksgaard. pp. 1–491. ISSN 0011-6211.
- Munk, Anders (1962). "An approach to an analysis of taxonomic method with main reference to higher Fungi". Taxon. 11 (6): 185–190. doi:10.2307/1217218.

== See also ==
- Category:Taxa named by Anders Munk
