= Keissleriella =

Scientific classification
- Domain: Eukaryota
- Kingdom: Fungi
- Division: Ascomycota
- Class: Dothideomycetes
- Order: Pleosporales
- Family: Lentitheciaceae
- Genus: Keissleriella; Höhn. (1919)

Type species
- Keissleriella aesculi (Höhn.) Höhn. (1919)

Synonyms
- Chaetopyrena Sacc. (1883); Chaetopyrenis Clem. & Shear (1931); Zopfinula Kirschst. (1939); Coenosphaeria Munk (1953)

Genus of fungi

Keissleriella is a genus of fungi, that was originally placed in the Massarinaceae family, before being placed in the Lentitheciaceae family.

The genus was circumscribed by Franz Xaver Rudolf von Höhnel in 1919, and was named in honour of Karl von Keissler (1872-1965), who was an Austrian lichenologist and mycologist.

== Species ==
As accepted by Species Fungorum;

- Keissleriella abruptipapilla M.E. Barr (1990)
- Keissleriella aesculi (Höhn.) Höhn. (1919)
- Keissleriella alpina S.K. Bose (1961)
- Keissleriella andersonii (Sacc.) M.E. Barr (1990)
- Keissleriella bambusicola H.B. Jiang, Phookamsak & K.D. Hyde (2019)
- Keissleriella bavarica Butin (1981)
- Keissleriella breviasca Kaz. Tanaka & K. Hiray. (2015)
- Keissleriella camporesiana Phukhams., Camporesi & K.D. Hyde (2020)
- Keissleriella camporesii C.G. Lin & K.D. Hyde (2020)
- Keissleriella caraganae Chaiwan, Phookamsak, Wanas. & K.D. Hyde (2019)
- Keissleriella caudata (E. Müll.) Corbaz (1957)
- Keissleriella cirsii R.H. Perera, Bulgakov, Wanas. & K.D. Hyde (2017)
- Keissleriella cladophila (Niessl) Corbaz (1957)
- Keissleriella conferta M.E. Barr (1990)
- Keissleriella culmifida (P. Karst.) S.K. Bose (1961)
- Keissleriella dactylidicola Mapook, Camporesi & K.D. Hyde (2015)
- Keissleriella dactylis Singtr., Camporesi & K.D. Hyde (2015)
- Keissleriella emergens (Sacc.) S.K. Bose (1961)
- Keissleriella gallica (E. Müll.) S.K. Bose (1961)
- Keissleriella genistae (G. Winter) E. Müll. (1962)
- Keissleriella holmiorum Math. (1993)
- Keissleriella hyalinospora (Kirschst.) E. Müll. (1962)
- Keissleriella italica Brahmanage, Camporesi & K.D. Hyde (2020)
- Keissleriella mediterranea S.K. Bose (1961)
- Keissleriella ocellata (Niessl ex Sacc.) S.K. Bose (1961)
- Keissleriella phragmiticola Wanas., E.B.G. Jones & K.D. Hyde (2018)
- Keissleriella pindaundeensis Otani (1971)
- Keissleriella pinicola D. Hawksw. & Sivan. (1975)
- Keissleriella poagena Crous & Quaedvl. (2014)
- Keissleriella quadriseptata Kaz. Tanaka & K. Hiray. (2015)
- Keissleriella rara Kohlm., Volkm.-Kohlm. & O.E. Erikss. (1996)
- Keissleriella rosacearum Phukhams., Camporesi & K.D. Hyde (2018)
- Keissleriella rosae Jayasiri, Camporesi & K.D. Hyde (2018)
- Keissleriella sambucina Höhn. (1919)
- Keissleriella spartiicola Singtr. & K.D. Hyde (2015)
- Keissleriella subalpina (Rehm) S.K. Bose (1961)
- Keissleriella syzygii R. Rao & Modak (1973)
- Keissleriella tamaricicola Thambug., Camporesi & K.D. Hyde (2016)
- Keissleriella taminensis (H. Wegelin) S.K. Bose (1961)
- Keissleriella trichophoricola Crous & Quaedvl. (2014)
- Keissleriella yonaguniensis Kaz. Tanaka & K. Hiray. (2015)

Former species;

- K. blepharospora Kohlm. & E. Kohlm. (1965) = Etheirophora blepharospora, Etheirophoraceae
- K. fusispora Scheuer (1988) = Trichometasphaeria fusispora, Lophiostomataceae
- K. gloeospora (Berk. & Curr.) S.K. Bose (1961) = Leptosphaeria gloeospora, Leptosphaeriaceae
- K. holmii (Luttr.) Arx (1970) = Exserohilum holmii, Pleosporaceae
- K. linearis E. Müll. ex Dennis (1964) = Lentithecium lineare, Lentitheciaceae
- K. podocarpi Butin (1975) = Lepteutypa podocarpi, Amphisphaeriaceae
- K. turcica (Luttr.) Arx (1970) = Exserohilum turcicum, Pleosporaceae
