= Massarina carolinensis =

Scientific classification
- Domain: Eukaryota
- Kingdom: Fungi
- Division: Ascomycota
- Class: Dothideomycetes
- Order: Pleosporales
- Family: Massarinaceae
- Genus: Massarina
- Species: M. carolinensis

Binomial name
- Massarina carolinensis Kohlm., Volkm.-Kohlm., & O.E.Erikss. (1996)

Species of fungus

Massarina carolinensis is a species of fungus in the Lophiostomataceae family. The species is found exclusively on the lower parts of the culms of the saltmarsh Juncus roemerianus on the Atlantic Coast of North Carolina.

== Taxonomy, classification, and naming ==
The species was first described by mycologists Jan Kohlmeyer, Brigitte Volkmann-Kohlmeyer, and Ove Eriksson in a 1996 Mycological Research publication. The specific epithet carolinensis is the Latinized name of the state where it was first discovered. The species was tentatively assigned to Massarina, although this genus is poorly known.

== Description ==
The roughly spherical fruit bodies are 130–160 μm high by 145–175 μm wide, and immersed in the cortex of the plant. Although initially covered by the plant cuticle, the fungus is later exposed when the cuticle peels off to reveal an ostiolate, leathery ascomata. The ascomata grow singly or in groups, and are clypeate (covered with a shield-like growth). Their color is blackish-brown in the upper parts, and light brown in the lower parts. A brown pseudoparenchyma covers the top of immature ascomata and rips apart at maturity; the tips of the pseudoparaphyses extend into the ostiole. The peridium is 9–13 μm thick, made of 4–5 layers of ellipsoidal cells, occluded by melanin, especially around the ostiole, to form a textura angularis—a parenchyma-like tissue of densely packed cells that appear angular in cross section. The hamathecium (a term referring to all hyphae developing between asci of the hymenium) is dense, containing many septate, and branched; the pseudoparaphyses anastomose in a gelatinous matrix. The asci measure 75–90 by 13–16 μm, with a short stalk; they are eight-spored (the spores are arranged in two or three parallel rows), cylindrical, bitunicate (two-layered), thick-walled, and lack any specialized apparatus at the tip. The ascospores mature successively on the tissue at the bottom of the locule. The ascospores are ellipsoidal, hyaline (translucent), and measure 16.5–21 by 4-5–65 μm. The spores have three speta, and are strongly constricted at these septa. They are enclosed by a gelatinous sheath that swells strongly in water after the membrane around the outer covering of the spore bursts.

M. carolinensis is similar in ascospore and fruit body morphology to the species M. ricifera, which grows on the same host plant. M. ricifera latter can be distinguished by the presence of a neck on the fruit body, the sparse pseudoparaphyses, and slightly larger ascospores measuring 19–25 by 5.5–7 μm. Additionally, it is a marine species, found between 10 and 30 cm (3.9 and 11.8 in) above the rhizome.

== Habitat and distribution ==
The fungus grows on the senescent culms of Juncus roemerianus. Because the fruit bodies are found on the middle and upper parts of the culm, typically between 78 and 97 cm (31 and 38 in) above the rhizome, it is considered a terrestrial organism. M. carolinensis is found on the Atlantic Coast of the United States.
