= Muroia =

Scientific classification
- Kingdom: Fungi
- Division: Ascomycota
- Class: Dothideomycetes
- Order: Pleosporales
- Family: Lophiostomataceae
- Genus: Muroia; I. Hino & Katum.

Type species
- Muroia nipponica I. Hino & Katum.

Genus of fungi

Muroia is a genus of fungi in the family Lophiostomataceae. A monotypic genus, it contains the single species Muroia nipponica.
