= Byssothecium =

Scientific classification
- Domain: Eukaryota
- Kingdom: Fungi
- Division: Ascomycota
- Class: Dothideomycetes
- Order: Pleosporales
- Family: Massarinaceae
- Genus: Byssothecium; Fuckel

Type species
- Byssothecium circinans Fuckel

Genus of fungi

Byssothecium is a genus of fungi in the family Massarinaceae.

This was a monotypic genus, containing the single species Byssothecium circinans and in the family Teichosporaceae. But more species were added and it was later placed in the Massarinaceae family

== Species ==
As accepted by Species Fungorum;

- Byssothecium cholla M.E. Barr (2002)
- Byssothecium circinans Fuckel (1861)
- Byssothecium dichroum (Pass.) Kirschst. (1936)
- Byssothecium flumineum J.L. Crane, Shearer & Huhndorf (1992)

Former species;

- B. alpestre (Tóth) Boise (1989) = Trematosphaeria alpestris, Trematosphaeriaceae
- B. heterosporum (De Not.) Niessl (1879) = Leptosphaeria heterospora, Leptosphaeriaceae
- B. incarceratum (Sacc.) Kirschst. (1936) = Passeriniella incarcerata, Massarinaceae
- B. obiones (P. Crouan & H. Crouan) M.E. Barr (2002) = Halobyssothecium obiones, Lentitheciaceae
