= Lophiella =

Scientific classification
- Kingdom: Fungi
- Division: Ascomycota
- Class: Dothideomycetes
- Order: Pleosporales
- Family: Lophiostomataceae
- Genus: Lophiella; Sacc.

Type species
- Lophiella cristata (Pers.) Sacc.

Genus of fungi

Lophiella is a genus of fungi in the family Lophiostomataceae.
