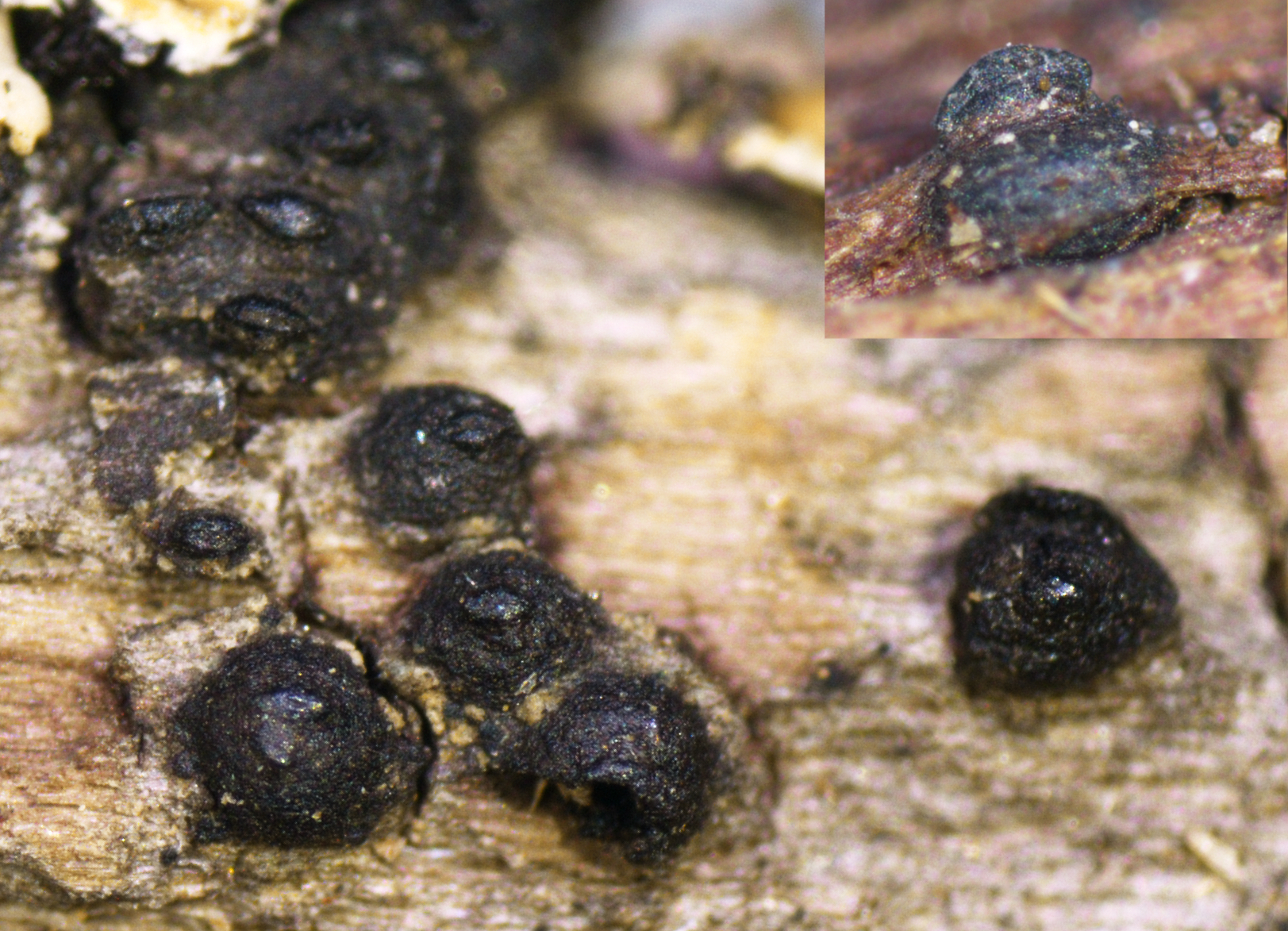

Scientific classification
- Kingdom: Fungi
- Division: Ascomycota
- Class: Dothideomycetes
- Order: Pleosporales
- Family: Lophiostomataceae
- Genus: Lophiostoma; Ces. & De Not.

Type species
- Lophiostoma macrostomum (Tode) Ces. & De Not.

Species
- List of associated species

Synonyms
- Platisphaera Dumort. (1822); Delacourea Fabre. (1879); Lophiotrema sect. "Vivianella" Sacc. (1883); Lophiosphaera subgen. Lambottiella Sacc.(1883); Lophiostoma subgen. Brigantiella Sacc. (1883); Lophiotricha Richon. (1885); Lophidiopsis Berl. (1890)

= Lophiostoma =

Genus of fungi

Lophiostoma is a genus of ascomycetous fungi in the family Lophiostomataceae.

Species are commonly found growing both on living and dead wood, bark of deciduous trees, on shrubs and on herbaceous hosts. They are also found in freshwater, and marine environments.

The genus both forms fruit bodies with sexual reproducing with ascocarp in the form of a perithecium and asexual reproduction in the form of conidia.

The ascocarp are usually flaskshaped or pearshaped (piriform), 0,2-0,6 mm (200-600 μm) wide, black of color and with a smooth surface without excrescence. The shape of the top of the perithecium called ostiole has a characteristic slitlike opening.

They grow either on very top of the substrate with most of its whole ascocarp on the top or with only the ostiole sticking through and the rest of the fruitbody below the surface.

There are many species of ascomycetes that form fruit-bodies alike those of Lophiostoma found both in class Dothidemycetes and Sordariomycetes, but the slitlike and somewhat oblong opening of the ostiole are characteristic but not exclusive.

== Nomenclature ==
Lophiostoma was formally established by Cesati and De Notaris (1863), and lectotypified by L. macrostomum.

The name of Lophiostoma meaning small crested mouth/door in Latin, which refer to the characteristic shape of the slitlike ostiole of the genus.

Latin: lophi <lophi, small crest + -ostoma <stóma, mouth or <ostium, door both referring to the pore or opening, usually at the top of diverse reproductive organs, here in the form of an ostiole.

== Ecology ==
Lophiostoma are saprophytes that grow on herbaceous and woody plants from terrestrial, freshwater, and marine environments.

== Morphology ==
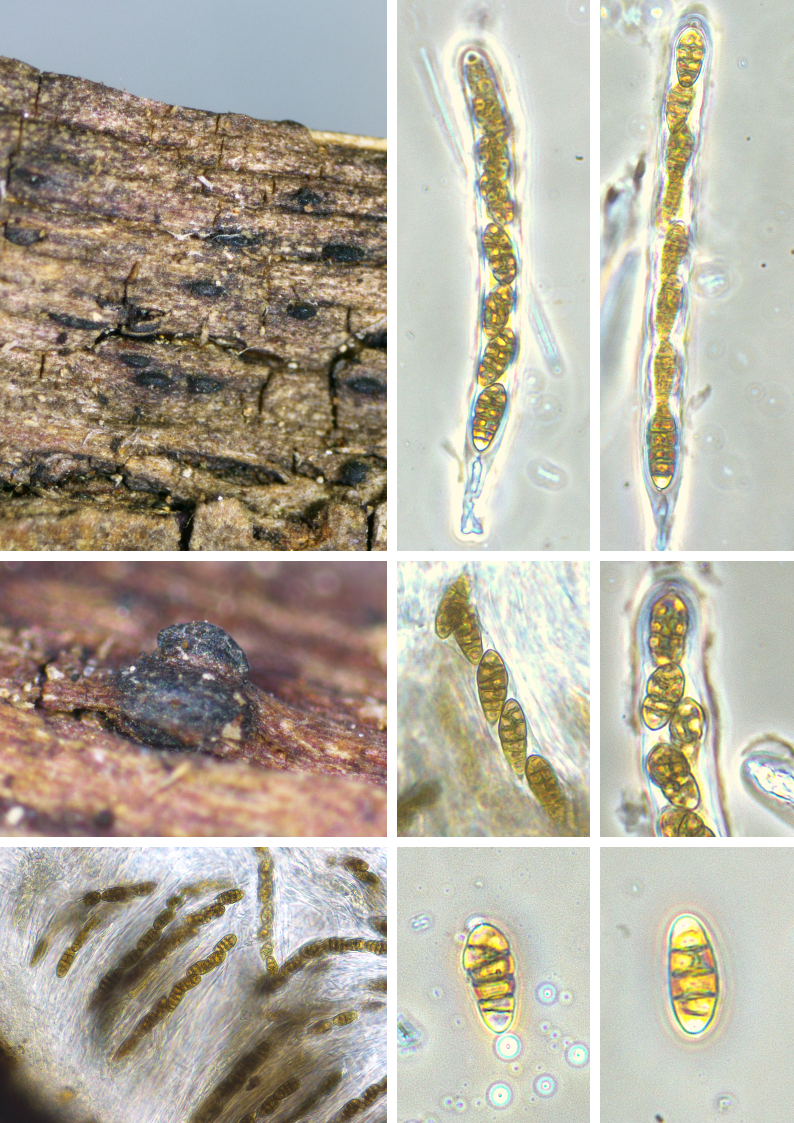
Lophiostoma compressum from Oslo Herbarium by Mathias Andreasen "Lophiostomataceae of Norway"

The fruit body of the sexual reproduction (teleomorph) are characterized as having immersed to erumpent ascocarp with a slitlike ostiole; unequal thickness of peridium, which is broader laterally at the base.

The shape of asci are mostly clavate and their morphology are bitunicate.

Ascospores are 1- to several septate, hyaline to dark brown ascospores with terminal appendages or mucous sheath.

The genus does also reproduce asexually (anamorph), creating conidia and conidiospores.

== Taxonomy ==
The family Lophiostomataceae was introduced by Nitschke (1869), with Lophiostoma macrostomum (Tode) Ces. & De Not. as the type species.

The slit-like ostiolar neck and peridium of the ascomata are regarded as variable structures within a single specimen. Chesters & Bell (1970) adapted ascospore features including color and longitudinal or transverse septation for generic circumscription. However, Holm & Holm (1988) considered ascospore septation as an unimportant characteristic at the generic level, but useful at the species level, and therefore used broad generic concepts for Lophiostomataceae. These broad generic concepts of Lophiostoma have been used by several authors (Barr 1987, 1992, Yuan & Zhao 1994, Checa 1997, Kirk et al. 2008, Mugambi & Huhndorf 2009,).

Lophiostoma possesses typical characters of Lophiostomataceae. Lophiostoma is morphologically a well-studied genus (Chesters and Bell, 1970; Holm and Holm, 1988; Barr, 1990; Yuan and Zhao, 1994), and currently it comprises about 30 species (Tanaka and Harada, 2003). The crest-like apex is not considered to be a stable character and varies considerably even in the same specimen (Chesters and Bell, 1970; Holm and Holm, 1988).

Previously anything with a lophiostomataceous, crest-like ostiole was usually placed in Lophiostoma without considering of other characters (Tanaka and Harada 2003, Tanaka and Hosoya 2008, Hirayama et al. 2014, Liu et al. 2015,).

== Phylogenetics ==
There are still considerable confusion surrounding the genera Lophiostoma, Lophiotrema, Platystomum and Massarina.

Lophiostoma was by Zhang et al. (2009), found to be polyphyletic and comprising two groups: Lophiostoma I and Lophiostoma II. This study also indicated that ascospore and apical morphology are morphological characters that have phylogenetic significance, though they are not fully reliable for generic level classification. Furthermore, a compressed apex has more phylogenetic significance than a crest-like apex.

A recent generic reevaluation of Lophiostomataceae (Thambugala et al. 2015,) segregated Lophiostoma s. lat. into 16 genera according to the multi-locus phylogenies using small subunit nrDNA (18S; SSU), large subunit nrDNA (28S; LSU), and translation elongation factor 1-α (tef1).

The family Lophiostomataceae was thought to be heterogeneous or paraphyletic, but recent phylogenetic analyses support the monophyletic status of Lophiostomataceae sensu stricto (Mugambi and Huhndorf 2009; Zhang et al. 2012; Hyde et al. 2013; Wijayawardene et al. 2014,). In their multi-gene analysis, Schoch et al. (2006, 2009,) showed Lophiostomataceae to belong in Pleosporales.

Zhang et al. (2009) showed that Lophiostoma, Lophiotrema and Massarina formed well-supported subclades in Pleosporales.
