= Keissleriella rara =

Scientific classification
- Domain: Eukaryota
- Kingdom: Fungi
- Division: Ascomycota
- Class: Dothideomycetes
- Order: Pleosporales
- Family: Lentitheciaceae
- Genus: Keissleriella
- Species: K. rara

Binomial name
- Keissleriella rara Kohlm., Volkm.-Kohlm. & O.E.Erikss. (1996)

Species of fungus

Keissleriella rara is a rare species of fungus in the family Lophiostomataceae. The species fruits exclusively on dead or dying standing culms of the saltmarsh plant Juncus roemerianus. It is known only from the Atlantic Coast of North Carolina.

== Taxonomy and naming ==
The species was first described by mycologists Jan Kohlmeyer, Brigitte Volkmann-Kohlmeyer, and Ove Eriksson in a 1996 Mycological Research publication. The specific epithet is from the Latin rarus ("rare"), refers to the rarity of the species.

== Description ==
The roughly spherical leathery fruit bodies (ascomata) are 170–240 μm high by 200–300 μm wide, and are almost completely embedded in the host tissue. The ascomata have ostioles (openings) at the top, and are arranged in small dark brown colonies with light grey patches where the cuticle is detached from the plant epidermis. There is a dark brown mycelium in the epidermal cells surrounding the ostioles, making a pseudostroma—a stroma in which fungal cells and remnants of host tissue are mixed. Although the ascomata have no necks, they do have black bristles (measuring 28–36 by 2.5–4 μm) that surround and obstruct the ostiole. The peridium is 10–13 μm thick, and made of 2–3 layers of roughly spherical or ellipsoidal brown cells with large lumina that form a textura angularis—a parenchyma-like tissue of very densely packed cells that appear angular in longitudinal section. Closer to the locule, the cells become more hyaline (translucent) and thin-walled; it is from this region that the pseudoparaphyses originate. The hamathecium (a term referring to all hyphae that develop between asci of the hymenium) is made of branched pseudoparaphyses measuring 3–6 μm in diameter. These pseudoparaphyses are embedded in a gelatinous matrix and anastomose above the asci, tapering at the tip to a length of about 1.5 μm while reaching into the ostiole. The thick-walled asci (spore-bearing cells) are 85–105 by 13–15 μm, eight-spored, cylindrical, and pedunculate (growing from a short stalk). The ascospores are biseriate (arranged into parallel rows in the ascus), ellipsoidal to spindle-shaped, sometimes strongly tapered at the lower end, contain three septa, and measure 21–275 by 6–9 μm. They are strongly constricted at the central septum, less so at the others, hyaline, and surrounded by a gelatinous sheath with an umbilicus (a single compact strand of fused hyphae) at the lower end.

== Habitat and distribution ==
The species grows on the dead or dying culms of Juncus roemerianus. The fungus fruits between 49 and 65 cm (19 and 26 in) above the level of the rhizoid, and it is consequently considered a halotolerant species, because it is occasionally exposed to sea spray. Found on the Atlantic Coast of North Carolina, K. rara is rare, having been collected only three times at the time of its publication.
