= Saccharicola =

Scientific classification
- Kingdom: Fungi
- Division: Ascomycota
- Class: Dothideomycetes
- Order: Pleosporales
- Family: Massarinaceae
- Genus: Saccharicola; D. Hawksw. & O.E. Erikss.

Type species
- Saccharicola bicolor (D. Hawksw., W.J. Kaiser & Ndimande) D. Hawksw. & O.E. Erikss.

Species
- Species include: Saccharicola bicolor; Saccharicola taiwanensis

Genus of fungi

Saccharicola is a genus of fungi in the Massarinaceae family.
