= Lophionema =

Scientific classification
- Kingdom: Fungi
- Division: Ascomycota
- Class: Dothideomycetes
- Order: Pleosporales
- Family: Lophiostomataceae
- Genus: Lophionema; Sacc.

Type species
- Lophionema vermisporum (Ellis) Sacc.

Genus of fungi

Lophionema is a genus of fungi in the family Lophiostomataceae.
