= Saccharicola taiwanensis =

Scientific classification
- Domain: Eukaryota
- Kingdom: Fungi
- Division: Ascomycota
- Class: Dothideomycetes
- Order: Pleosporales
- Family: Massarinaceae
- Genus: Saccharicola
- Species: S. taiwanensis

Binomial name
- Saccharicola taiwanensis (J.M. Yen & C.C. Chi) O.E. Erikss. & D. Hawksw., (2003)

Synonyms
- Cercospora taiwanensis T. Matsumoto & W. Yamam., (1934); Didymella taiwanensis (J.M. Yen & C.C. Chi) Shoemaker & C.E. Babc., (1989); Leptosphaeria taiwanensis W.Y. Yen & C.C. Chi, (1952); Mycovellosiella taiwanensis (T. Matsumoto & W. Yamam.) X.J. Liu & Y.L. Guo, (1988); Pseudocercospora taiwanensis (T. Matsumoto & W. Yamam.) J.M. Yen, (1981)

Species of fungus

Saccharicola taiwanensis is a plant pathogen infecting sugarcane.
