= Quintaria =

Scientific classification
- Kingdom: Fungi
- Division: Ascomycota
- Class: Dothideomycetes
- Order: Pleosporales
- Family: Lophiostomataceae
- Genus: Quintaria; Kohlm. & Volkm.-Kohlm.

Type species
- Quintaria lignatilis (Kohlm.) Kohlm. & Volkm.-Kohlm.

Genus of fungi

Quintaria is a genus of fungi in the family Lophiostomataceae.

Quintaria lignatilis and other fungi genera (including Aniptodera salsuginosa) have been found on decaying woody substrata in intertidal mangrove forests within Thailand.

== Species ==
As accepted by Species Fungorum;

- Quintaria aquatica K.D. Hyde & Goh (1999)
- Quintaria lignatilis (Kohlm.) Kohlm. & Volkm.-Kohlm. (1991)
- Quintaria microspora Ying Zhang, K.D. Hyde & J. Fourn. (2008)

Former species; Q. submersa K.D. Hyde & Goh (1999) = Neolindgomyces submersus, Lindgomycetaceae
