= Byssolophis =

Scientific classification
- Kingdom: Fungi
- Division: Ascomycota
- Class: Dothideomycetes
- Order: Pleosporales
- Family: Lophiostomataceae
- Genus: Byssolophis; Clem.

Type species
- Byssolophis byssiseda (Flageolet & Chenant.) Clem.

Species
- Byssolophis byssiseda (Flageolet & Chenant.) Clem. Byssolophis sphaerioides (P. Karst.) E. Müll., 1962

Genus of fungi

Byssolophis is a genus of fungi in the family Lophiostomataceae.
