= Helminthosporium papulosum =

Scientific classification
- Domain: Eukaryota
- Kingdom: Fungi
- Division: Ascomycota
- Class: Dothideomycetes
- Order: Pleosporales
- Family: Massarinaceae
- Genus: Helminthosporium
- Species: H. papulosum

Binomial name
- Helminthosporium papulosum Anth. Berg, (1934)

Species of fungus

Helminthosporium papulosum is a fungal plant pathogen that causes blister canker on pear and apple.
