= Karl von Keissler =

Austrian lichenologist and mycologist (1872–1965)

Karl von Keissler (13 March 1872, in Vienna – 9 January 1965) was an Austrian lichenologist and mycologist.

In 1895 he obtained his doctorate from the University of Vienna, afterwards spending several years as an assistant in the botanical garden at Vienna. From 1899 to 1938, he performed various functions in the botanical department at the Naturhistorisches Museum. In 1922 (or 1923) he was appointed director of the museum's botanical department. Starting from 1923 until 1933 he published the exsiccata Kryptogamae exsiccatae editae a Museo Palatino Vindobonensi.

The lichenicolous fungi genus Keissleriomyces (D.Hawksw. 1981) bears his name, as do the mycological genera Keissleria (a synonym of Broomella Sacc.) and Keissleriella (both were named by Franz Xaver Rudolf von Höhnel). Similarly, Keisslerellum was published by Werner in 1944 before becoming a synonym for Mycoporellum (Müll.Arg.) Also Keisslerina (a synonym of Dothiora Fr.) and Neokeissleria (a synonym of Ceriospora Henn. & Plöttn.) both were named by Franz Petrak.

== Selected works ==
- Systematische Untersuchungen über Flechtenparasiten und lichenoide Pilze, 1920 - Systematic investigations of lichen parasites and lichenoid fungi.
- Die Flechtenparasiten, 1928 - Lichen parasites.
- Zusammenstellung einiger interessanter flechtenparasiten, 1933 - Compilation of some interesting lichen parasites.
- Moriolaceae, 1934 - The fungi family Moriolaceae.
- Pyrenulaceae bis Mycoporaceae, Coniocarpineae, 1938 - Pyrenulaceae to Mycoporaceae, Coniocarpineae.
- Usneaceae, 1960 - The lichen family Usneaceae.

== See also ==
- Category:Taxa named by Karl von Keissler
