= Lentithecium =

Scientific classification
- Kingdom: Fungi
- Division: Ascomycota
- Class: Dothideomycetes
- Order: Pleosporales
- Family: Lentitheciaceae
- Genus: Lentithecium; K.D.Hyde, J.Fourn. & Ying Zhang

Genus of fungi

Lentithecium is a genus of fungi belonging to the family Lentitheciaceae.

The species of this genus are found in Europe.

== Species ==
As accepted by Species Fungorum;

- Lentithecium aquaticum Ying Zhang, J.Fourn. & K.D.Hyde (2009)
- Lentithecium clioninum (Kaz.Tanaka, Sat.Hatak. & Y.Harada) Kaz.Tanaka & K.Hiray. (2015)
- Lentithecium fluviatile (Aptroot & Van Ryck.) K.D.Hyde, J.Fourn. & Ying Zhang (2009)
- Lentithecium lineare (E.Müll. ex Dennis) K.D.Hyde, J.Fourn. & Ying Zhang (2009)
- Lentithecium pseudoclioninum Kaz.Tanaka & K.Hiray. (2015)
- Lentithecium yunnanense W.H. Lu, Karun. & Tibpromma (2022)

Former species (all in Lentitheciaceae family);

- L. arundinaceum (Sowerby) K.D. Hyde, J. Fourn. & Ying Zhang (2009) = Setoseptoria arundinacea
- L. cangshanense Z.L. Luo, X.J. Su & K.D. Hyde (2016) = Halobyssothecium cangshanense
- L. carbonneanum J. Fourn., Raja & Oberlies (2018) = Halobyssothecium carbonneanum
- L. kunmingense W. Dong, H. Zhang & K.D. Hyde (2020) = Halobyssothecium kunmingense
- L. rarum (Kohlm., Volkm.-Kohlm. & O.E. Erikss.) Suetrong, Sakay., E.B.G. Jones, Kohlm. & Volkm.-Kohlm. (2020) = Keissleriella rara
- L. unicellulare Abdel-Aziz (2016) = Halobyssothecium unicellulare
- L. voraginesporum Abdel-Wahab, Bahkali & E.B.G. Jones (2016) = Halobyssothecium voraginesporum
