= Darksidea =

Scientific classification
- Kingdom: Fungi
- Division: Ascomycota
- Class: Dothideomycetes
- Order: Pleosporales
- Family: Lentitheciaceae
- Genus: Darksidea; D.G. Knapp, Kovács, J.Z. Groenew. & Crous (2015)

Type species
- Darksidea alpha D.G. Knapp, Kovács, J.Z. Groenew. & Crous (2015)

Species
- Darksidea alpha Darksidea beta Darksidea delta Darksidea epsilon Darksidea gamma Darksidea zeta

Genus of fungi

Darksidea is a genus of fungi belonging to the ascomycetes, in the order Pleosporales. It was described in 2015 by D.G. Knapp, Kovács, J.Z. Groenew. & Crous. Like many other members of the ascomycetes, they are dark septate endophytes, who colonize epidermal, intra- and inter-cellular root tissue, nearly always found upon grass species in arid or semiarid climates.

The name "Darksidea" is not only inspired by the unique coloration of its hyphae, but is also a reference to its membership within the dark septate endophytes, being "on the dark side" of this mysterious and confounding form-group of root-associated fungi.

== Species ==
- Darksidea alpha
- Darksidea beta
- Darksidea delta
- Darksidea epsilon
- Darksidea gamma
- Darksidea zeta
