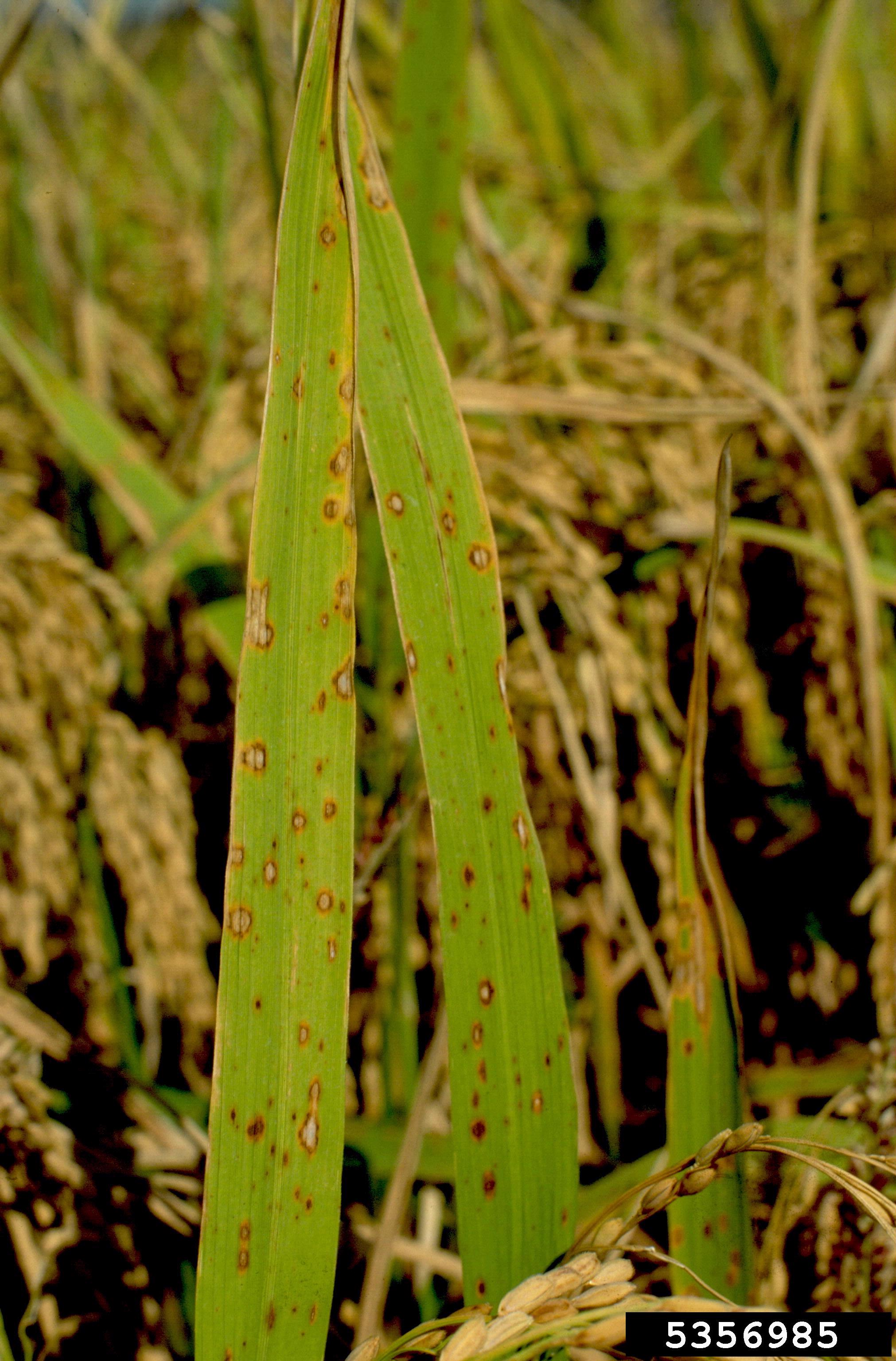
- Helminthosporium oryzae on Oryza sativa

Scientific classification
- Domain: Eukaryota
- Kingdom: Fungi
- Division: Ascomycota
- Class: Dothideomycetes
- Order: Pleosporales
- Family: Massarinaceae
- Genus: Helminthosporium; Link

= Helminthosporium =

Genus of fungi

Helminthosporium is a genus of fungi belonging to the family Massarinaceae. The genus has a cosmopolitan distribution.

== Species ==
The following species are recognised in the genus Helminthosporium:

- Helminthosporium abietis W.B. Cooke & C.G. Shaw (1952)
- Helminthosporium acaciae M.B. Ellis (1961)
- Helminthosporium acalyphae (Thüm.) Cif. (1955)
- Helminthosporium accedens Syd. & P. Syd. (1904)
- Helminthosporium ahmadii M.B. Ellis (1961)
- Helminthosporium aichrysonis Jørst. (1966)
- Helminthosporium alatum Cif. (1962)
- Helminthosporium albiziae Petch (1909)
- Helminthosporium albiziicola Thirum. & Naras. (1950)
- Helminthosporium allamandae Petr. & Cif. (1932)
- Helminthosporium alphitoniae Petr. (1954)
- Helminthosporium aneurolepidii Lavrov (1951)
- Helminthosporium anomalum J.C. Gilman & E.V. Abbott (1927)
- Helminthosporium anonymicum Jacz. (1915)
- Helminthosporium apiculatum Corda (1837)
- Helminthosporium appatternae K.S. Deshp. & K.B. Deshp. (1970)
- Helminthosporium appendiculatum Corda (1837)
- Helminthosporium aquaticum Hong Y. Su, Z.L. Luo & K.D. Hyde (2016)
- Helminthosporium arcautei Unamuno (1932)
- Helminthosporium asterinoides Sacc. & P. Syd. (1902)
- Helminthosporium asterinum Cooke (1878)
- Helminthosporium astragali Zaprom. (1957)
- Helminthosporium atypicum K.S. Deshp. & K.B. Deshp. (1968)
- Helminthosporium austriacum Voglmayr & Jaklitsch (2017)
- Helminthosporium avenae-pratensis Died. (1910)
- Helminthosporium bactridis Henn. (1908)
- Helminthosporium bakeri Syd. & P. Syd. (1916)
- Helminthosporium bambusicola Meng Zhang, H.Y. Wu & Zhen Y. Wang (2010)
- Helminthosporium bataticola Khokhr. & Dyur. (1934)
- Helminthosporium bauhiniae M.B. Ellis (1961)
- Helminthosporium belgaumense Subram. & Bhat (1989)
- Helminthosporium bhawanii A.P. Misra (1976)
- Helminthosporium bondarzewii Pidopl. (1950)
- Helminthosporium cacaliae Viégas (1946)
- Helminthosporium cacaophilum Cif. (1931)
- Helminthosporium cactacearum Bongini (1932)
- Helminthosporium caespitiferum Petr. & Cif. (1932)
- Helminthosporium canephorae Steyaert (1948)
- Helminthosporium cantareirense Henn. (1908)
- Helminthosporium cantonense Sacc. (1921)
- Helminthosporium caperoniae Petr. & Cif. (1932)
- Helminthosporium carpocrinum Cif. (1938)
- Helminthosporium carposaprum Pollack (1946)
- Helminthosporium ceibae Orillo (1955)
- Helminthosporium chengduense Y.P. Chen & Maharachch. (2022)
- Helminthosporium chiangraiense Boonmee, Huanraluek & K.D. Hyde (2021)
- Helminthosporium chinense Y.P. Chen & Maharachch. (2022)
- Helminthosporium chlorophorae M.B. Ellis (1961)
- Helminthosporium chrysobalani Henn. (1907)
- Helminthosporium chusqueae Petr. (1950)
- Helminthosporium cibotii F. Stevens & Weedon (1925)
- Helminthosporium ciliare (Bull.) S. Hughes (1958)
- Helminthosporium citri Sawada (1931)
- Helminthosporium claviphorum Matsush. (1993)
- Helminthosporium cleosmatis Petr. & Cif. (1932)
- Helminthosporium clusiae Cif. & Gonz. Frag. (1926)
- Helminthosporium coffeae Massee (1901)
- Helminthosporium conidiophorellum Meng Zhang & T.Y. Zhang (2009)
- Helminthosporium constrictum Meng Zhang, T.Y. Zhang & W.P. Wu (2007)
- Helminthosporium conviva Malençon & Bertault (1972)
- Helminthosporium corchori Sawada & Katsuki (1959)
- Helminthosporium crassiseptum Cif. (1955)
- Helminthosporium crotalariae S. Chowdhury (1957)
- Helminthosporium crus-galli Y. Nisik. (1925)
- Helminthosporium cubense Matsush. (1987)
- Helminthosporium cucumerinum Garb. (1924)
- Helminthosporium curvulum Sacc. (1919)
- Helminthosporium cuspidatum Sacc. (1917)
- Helminthosporium cylindricum Corda (1831)
- Helminthosporium cymmartinii A.P. Misra (1976)
- Helminthosporium cyperi Bacc. (1907)
- Helminthosporium dactylidis (Shoemaker) Nishih. (1969)
- Helminthosporium dalbergiae M.B. Ellis (1961)
- Helminthosporium davillae Syd. & P. Syd. (1901)
- Helminthosporium decacuminatum Thüm. & Pass. (1878)
- Helminthosporium delicatulum Berk. (1841)
- Helminthosporium delphinii Golovin (1950)
- Helminthosporium dendroideum Berk. & Broome (1861)
- Helminthosporium desmodii Togashi & Katsuki (1953)
- Helminthosporium diedickei Magnus (1903)
- Helminthosporium dimorphosporum Hol.-Jech. (1987)
- Helminthosporium dolichi Syd. & P. Syd. (1904)
- Helminthosporium dongxingense Meng Zhang & T.Y. Zhang (2013)
- Helminthosporium elasticae Koord. (1907)
- Helminthosporium endiandrae (Crous & Summerell) Voglmayr & Jaklitsch (2017)
- Helminthosporium eragrostiellae A.P. Misra (1976)
- Helminthosporium erythrinae Thirum. & Naras. (1950)
- Helminthosporium erythrinicola Crous & M.J. Wingf. (2019)
- Helminthosporium exasperatum Berk. & Broome (1873)
- Helminthosporium feijoae Cif. (1927)
- Helminthosporium ferrugineum Sacc., Syd. & P. Syd. (1901)
- Helminthosporium fici Rostr. (1902)
- Helminthosporium ficinum Sacc. (1919)
- Helminthosporium filamentosum W.H. Tian, Yan Jin & Maharachch. (2024)
- Helminthosporium filicicola Henn. (1905)
- Helminthosporium flagellatum H.S. Yates (1918)
- Helminthosporium flumeanum Sacc. (1931)
- Helminthosporium fumagineum Sacc. (1919)
- Helminthosporium gibberosporum Curzi (1931)
- Helminthosporium glabroides F. Stevens (1918)
- Helminthosporium gleicheniae F. Stevens & Glick (1925)
- Helminthosporium gossypii Tucker (1926)
- Helminthosporium grewiae Henn. (1907)
- Helminthosporium guangxiense Meng Zhang & T.Y. Zhang (2009)
- Helminthosporium guanshanense Y.F. Hu & Jian Ma (2023)
- Helminthosporium guianense F. Stevens & R.I. Dowell (1923)
- Helminthosporium guizhouense M.T. Zou & Yong Wang bis (2024)
- Helminthosporium guizhouense Y.Y. Yang, A.R. Gomes de Farias & K.D. Hyde (2024)
- Helminthosporium heringerianum Viégas (1948)
- Helminthosporium hispanicum Voglmayr & Jaklitsch (2017)
- Helminthosporium hispaniolae Cif. (1931)
- Helminthosporium hunanense Meng Zhang, H.Y. Wu & Zhen Y. Wang (2010)
- Helminthosporium hygrophilae Cif. (1962)
- Helminthosporium insigne Gaillard ex Sacc. (1919)
- Helminthosporium insuetum Petr. (1950)
- Helminthosporium ipomoeae Sawada & Katsuki (1959)
- Helminthosporium iranicum Esfand. (1951)
- Helminthosporium italicum Qing Tian, Camporesi & K.D. Hyde (2017)
- Helminthosporium jiulianshanense Y.F. Hu & Jian Ma (2023)
- Helminthosporium juglandinum Voglmayr & Jaklitsch (2017)
- Helminthosporium juglandis G.C. Zhao & R.L. Zhao (2012)
- Helminthosporium kakamegense Siboe, P.M. Kirk & P.F. Cannon (1999)
- Helminthosporium kalakadense (Subram. & Sekar) Voglmayr & Jaklitsch (2017)
- Helminthosporium kalopanacis Gornostaĭ (1972)
- Helminthosporium kok-saghyz Cherem. (1951)
- Helminthosporium kyllingae Hansf. (1943)
- Helminthosporium lablab Sawada & Katsuki (1959)
- Helminthosporium leucadendri (Quaedvl., Verkley & Crous) Voglmayr & Jaklitsch (2017)
- Helminthosporium leucosykes H.S. Yates (1918)
- Helminthosporium lignicola R.J. Xu, S. Boonmee, Q. Zhao & K.D. Hyde (2023)
- Helminthosporium ligustri Meng Zhang & T.Y. Zhang (2009)
- Helminthosporium litseae S. Chowdhury (1955)
- Helminthosporium livistonae Crous (2018)
- Helminthosporium longisinuatum Matsush. (1993)
- Helminthosporium lonicerae Viégas (1946)
- Helminthosporium lophirae Syd. (1937)
- Helminthosporium lunzinense Svilv. (1941)
- Helminthosporium lusitanicum Sousa da Câmara (1949)
- Helminthosporium lycopersici Roldan (1936)
- Helminthosporium machaerii Viégas (1946)
- Helminthosporium macilentum Cooke (1877)
- Helminthosporium magnisporum Shirouzu & Y. Harada (2008)
- Helminthosporium makilingense Syd. & P. Syd. (1920)
- Helminthosporium manihotis Rangel (1902)
- Helminthosporium marantae Sawada & Katsuki (1959)
- Helminthosporium massarinum Kaz. Tanaka, K. Hiray. & Shirouzu (2015)
- Helminthosporium matsushimae D.W. Li, K. Zhang & R.F. Castañeda (2020)
- Helminthosporium mattiroloi Castell. & Cif. (1950)
- Helminthosporium mayaguezense Miles (1917)
- Helminthosporium meilingense Y.F. Hu & Jian Ma (2023)
- Helminthosporium melastomatacearum F. Stevens (1918)
- Helminthosporium melioloides Sacc. (1919)
- Helminthosporium microsorum D. Sacc. (1898)
- Helminthosporium microsporum K.S. Deshp. & K.B. Deshp. (1970)
- Helminthosporium minimum Cooke (1888)
- Helminthosporium multiseptatum Meng Zhang, T.Y. Zhang & W.P. Wu (2007)
- Helminthosporium nabanhense Jing W. Liu & Jian Ma (2022)
- Helminthosporium nadsonii Jacz. (1929)
- Helminthosporium nanjingense Meng Zhang, Xiao J. Wang & H.Y. Wu (2014)
- Helminthosporium naviculare Syd. & P. Syd. (1903)
- Helminthosporium naviculatum Dearn. & House (1925)
- Helminthosporium newbouldiae Vienn.-Bourg. (1959)
- Helminthosporium novae-zelandiae S. Hughes (1980)
- Helminthosporium obpyriforme Meng Zhang & T.Y. Zhang (2009)
- Helminthosporium ocoteae F. Stevens (1918)
- Helminthosporium oligosporum (Corda) S. Hughes (1958)
- Helminthosporium olisipponense Sousa da Câmara (1936)
- Helminthosporium oplismeni Sawada & Katsuki (1959)
- Helminthosporium orchidacearum Chevassut (1992)
- Helminthosporium orthospermum Sacc. & Fairm. (1906)
- Helminthosporium oryzae-microsporae Hiroë (1935)
- Helminthosporium ovoideum Meng Zhang & T.Y. Zhang (2009)
- Helminthosporium pachystelae Henn. (1904)
- Helminthosporium palaestinum Săvul. & Rayss (1935)
- Helminthosporium palmigenum Matsush. (1971)
- Helminthosporium panici F. Stevens (1918)
- Helminthosporium papulosum Anth. Berg (1934)
- Helminthosporium paraoligosporum Ilyukhin & Markovsk. (2023)
- Helminthosporium parathesicola F. Stevens (1918)
- Helminthosporium paulense Henn. (1908)
- Helminthosporium penniseti A.P. Misra (1976)
- Helminthosporium philippinum Sacc. (1919)
- Helminthosporium philodendri F. Stevens (1918)
- Helminthosporium phomatae Dearn. & House (1925)
- Helminthosporium phyllantheum Sacc. (1919)
- Helminthosporium pini W.H. Tian & Maharachch. (2024)
- Helminthosporium piperis Sawada & Katsuki (1959)
- Helminthosporium portoricense (Speg.) Cif. (1955)
- Helminthosporium proliferatum K.S. Deshp. & K.B. Deshp. (1968)
- Helminthosporium pseudomicrosorum Meng Zhang & T.Y. Zhang (2009)
- Helminthosporium pseudotsugae W.B. Cooke (1952)
- Helminthosporium purpurascens Bourne (1956)
- Helminthosporium pyracanthae M.T. Lucas & Sousa da Câmara (1953)
- Helminthosporium quercicola (M.E. Barr) Voglmayr & Jaklitsch (2017)
- Helminthosporium quercinum Voglmayr & Jaklitsch (2017)
- Helminthosporium repens Dearn. & Barthol. (1917)
- Helminthosporium reyesii Died. (1916)
- Helminthosporium rhodomyrti Syd. & P. Syd. (1920)
- Helminthosporium rhopaloides Fresen. (1852)
- Helminthosporium schelkownikowii Woron. (1927)
- Helminthosporium scolecoides Corda (1837)
- Helminthosporium sechiicola J.A. Stev. (1919)
- Helminthosporium shangrilaense Y.Y. Yang & K.D. Hyde (2023)
- Helminthosporium sichuanense Meng Zhang, T.Y. Zhang & W.P. Wu (2004)
- Helminthosporium sinense Jing W. Liu & Jian Ma (2022)
- Helminthosporium solani Durieu & Mont. (1849)
- Helminthosporium solitarium F. Patt. (1900)
- Helminthosporium spirotrichum Sacc. (1921)
- Helminthosporium spurirostrum Meng Zhang, T.Y. Zhang & W.P. Wu (2004)
- Helminthosporium subapiculatum Peck (1911)
- Helminthosporium subhyalinum Meng Zhang & T.Y. Zhang (2007)
- Helminthosporium submersum Z.L. Luo, N. Zhao, K.D. Hyde & H.Y. Su (2018)
- Helminthosporium subsimile Sacc. (1921)
- Helminthosporium syzygii Crous & M.J. Wingf. (2019)
- Helminthosporium theobromae Turconi (1920)
- Helminthosporium theobromicola Cif. & Gonz. Frag. (1927)
- Helminthosporium tritikernelis A.P. Misra (1976)
- Helminthosporium turbinatum Berk. & Broome (1851)
- Helminthosporium ubangiense Henn. (1906)
- Helminthosporium ustilaginoideum Henn. (1907)
- Helminthosporium varroniae F. Stevens (1917)
- Helminthosporium velutinum Link (1809)
- Helminthosporium viticis Syd. & P. Syd. (1909)
- Helminthosporium wagateae Thirum. & Naras. (1950)
- Helminthosporium warpuriae Wakef. (1918)
- Helminthosporium xanthosomatis Gonz. Frag. & Cif. (1928)
- Helminthosporium xylopiifolii Bat. (1960)
- Helminthosporium yunnanense Jing W. Liu & Jian Ma (2022)
