= Semifissispora =

Scientific classification
- Kingdom: Fungi
- Division: Ascomycota
- Class: Dothideomycetes
- Order: Pleosporales
- Family: Massarinaceae
- Genus: Semifissispora; H.J. Swart

Type species
- Semifissispora fusiformis H.J. Swart

Genus of fungi

Semifissispora is a genus of fungi in the class Dothideomycetes. It was placed in Massarinaceae family and was accepted by Wijayawardene et al. 2020;

== Species ==
As accepted by Species Fungorum;

- Semifissispora elongata H.J. Swart (1982)
- Semifissispora fusiformis H.J. Swart (1982)
- Semifissispora natalis Crous, Jacq. Edwards & P.W.J. Taylor (2015)
- Semifissispora rotundata H.J. Swart (1982)
- Semifissispora tooloomensis Crous (2017)
