= Lindgomyces =

Scientific classification
- Domain: Eukaryota
- Kingdom: Fungi
- Division: Ascomycota
- Class: Dothideomycetes
- Order: Pleosporales
- Family: Lindgomycetaceae
- Genus: Lindgomyces; K.Hirayama, Kaz.Tanaka & Shearer (2010)

Type species
- Lindgomyces ingoldianus (Shearer & K.D.Hyde) K.Hirayama, Kaz.Tanaka & (Shearer 2010)

Genus of fungi

Lindgomyces is a genus of aquatic fungi in the family Lindgomycetaceae. Described as new to science in 2010, the genus contained six species known from Japan and the USA. More were added later, up to 14 species were accepted by Wijayawardene et al. 2020.

== Species ==
As accepted by Species Fungorum;

- Lindgomyces angustiascus Raja, A.N. Mill. & Shearer (2013)
- Lindgomyces apiculatus K. Hiray. & Kaz. Tanaka (2011)
- Lindgomyces aquaticus W. Dong, H. Zhang & K.D. Hyde (2020)
- Lindgomyces breviappendiculatus (Kaz. Tanaka, Sat. Hatak. & Y. Harada) K. Hiray. & Kaz. Tanaka (2010)
- Lindgomyces carolinensis Raja, J. Fourn., Paguigan & Oberlies (2017)
- Lindgomyces cigarosporus Raja, J. Fourn., Paguigan & Oberlies (2017)
- Lindgomyces cinctosporus Raja, A.N. Mill. & Shearer (2010)
- Lindgomyces griseosporus Ying Zhang, J. Fourn. & K.D. Hyde (2014)
- Lindgomyces guizhouensis J. Mai, Y.Z. Lu & K.D. Hyde (2023)
- Lindgomyces ingoldianus (Shearer & K.D. Hyde) K. Hiray., Kaz. Tanaka & Shearer (2010)
- Lindgomyces lemonweirensis Raja, A.N. Mill. & Shearer (2011)
- Lindgomyces madisonensis Raja & Oberlies (2015)
- Lindgomyces okinawaensis Tak. Takah. & Kaz. Tanaka (2016)
- Lindgomyces pseudomadisonensis Tak. Takah. & Kaz. Tanaka (2016)
- Lindgomyces rotundatus K. Hiray. & Kaz. Tanaka (2010)
