= Katumotoa =

Scientific classification
- Domain: Eukaryota
- Kingdom: Fungi
- Division: Ascomycota
- Class: Dothideomycetes
- Order: Pleosporales
- Family: Lentitheciaceae
- Genus: Katumotoa; Kaz. Tanaka & Y. Harada

Genus of fungi

Katumotoa is a monotypic genus of fungi, that was originally placed in the family Phaeosphaeriaceae in 2005, before it was placed into family Lentitheciaceae (which was published in 2009).

The genus only contains one known species, Katumotoa bambusicola Kaz. Tanaka & Y. Harada (2005)
