= Lentitheciaceae =

Scientific classification
- Kingdom: Fungi
- Division: Ascomycota
- Class: Dothideomycetes
- Order: Pleosporales
- Family: Lentitheciaceae; Y. Zhang ter, C.L. Schoch, J.Fourn., Crous & K.D.Hyde, 2009 Stud. Mycol. 64: 93

Type genus
- Lentithecium fluviatile (Aptroot & Van Ryck.) K.D. Hyde, J. Fourn. & Ying Zhang

Genera
- see text

Family of fungi

The Lentitheciaceae are a family of fungi in the order of Pleosporales. They are found world-wide (within China, Egypt, Hungary, Italy, Japan, Russia, Saudi, Thailand, UK and Uzbekistan,) with the greatest contributions found in Europe and Australia.

In a phylogenetic study of Lophiostoma and Massarina species, Lentithecium was proposed in 2009 based on Lophiostoma fluvitale now called Lentithecium fluviatile (Aptroot & Van Ryck.) K.D.Hyde, J.Fourn. & Ying Zhang. Lentitheciaceae is a well supported clade.

Lentitheciaceous taxa are saprobic (living on dead tissue) on herbaceous and woody plants having narrow peridia, fusiform to broadly cylindrical pseudoparaphyses (sterile, thread-like filaments), hyaline (glassy appearance) ascospores with 1–3-transverse septa and containing refractive globules, surrounded by a mucilaginous sheath or extended appendage-like sheaths and asexual morphs producing stagonospora-like or dendrophoma-like asexual morphs. They are found in terrestrial or aquatic habitats.

== Taxonomy ==
Genera accepted by the GBIF include:

- Aquilomyces D.G.Knapp, Kovács, J.Z.Groenew. & Crous, 2015 (5)
- Coenosphaeria
- Darksidea D.G.Knapp, Kovács, J.Z.Groenew. & Crous, 2015 (17)
- Flavomyces D.G.Knapp, Kovács, Groenewald & Crous, 2015 (2)
- Halobyssothecium Dayarathne, E.B.G.Jones & K.D.Hyde, 2018 (2)
- Katumotoa K.Tanaka & Y.Harada, 2005 (1)
- Keissleriella Höhn., 1919 (54)
- Lentithecium K.D.Hyde, J.Fourn. & Ying Zhang (6)
- Murilentithecium Wanas., Camporesi, E.B.G.Jones & K.D.Hyde, 2014 (5)
- Neoophiosphaerella Kaz.Tanaka & K.Hiray., 2015 (2)
- Poaceascoma Phookamsak & K.D.Hyde, 2015 (7)
- Setoseptoria Quaedvl., Verkley & Crous, 2013 (11)
- Suttonomyces Wijayaw., Camporesi & K.D.Hyde, 2015 (3)
- Tingoldiago K.Hirayama & K.Tanaka, 2010 (4)
- Towyspora Wanas., E.B.G. Jones & K.D. Hyde (2016) (1)
- Zopfinula Kirschst. (1939) (1)

Figures in brackets are approx. how many species per genus.

== Bibliography ==
- Aveskamp, M.M.; de Gruyter, J.; Woudenberg, J.H.C.; Verkley, G.J.M.; Crous, P.W. (2010). "Highlights of the Didymellaceae: A polyphasic approach to characterise Phoma and related pleosporalean genera". Studies in Mycology. 65: 1–60. doi:10.3114/sim.2010.65.01. PMC 2836210. PMID 20502538.
- Zhang Y, Schoch CL, Fournier J, Crous PW, Gruyter J De, Woudenberg JHC, Hirayama K, Tanaka K, Pointing SB, Hyde KD. 2009. Multi-locus phylogeny of the Pleosporales: a taxonomic, ecological and evolutionary re-evaluation. Studies in Mycology 64: 85–102.
