= Moriolaceae =

Scientific classification
- Kingdom: Fungi
- Division: Ascomycota
- Class: Dothideomycetes
- Subclass: incertae sedis
- Family: Moriolaceae; Zahlbr., 1903

Type genus
- Moriola Norman, 1872

Family of fungi

The Moriolaceae are a family of fungi with an uncertain taxonomic placement in the class Dothideomycetes. A monotypic taxon, it contains the single genus Moriola.
