= Lophiotrema =

Scientific classification
- Kingdom: Fungi
- Division: Ascomycota
- Class: Dothideomycetes
- Order: Pleosporales
- Family: Lophiostomataceae
- Genus: Lophiotrema; Sacc.

Type species
- Lophiotrema nucula Rehm

Genus of fungi

Lophiotrema is a genus of fungi in the family Lophiostomataceae.
