= Lindgomycetaceae =

Scientific classification
- Domain: Eukaryota
- Kingdom: Fungi
- Division: Ascomycota
- Class: Dothideomycetes
- Order: Pleosporales
- Family: Lindgomycetaceae; K.Hirayama, Kaz.Tanaka & Shearer, 2010

Family of fungi

Lindgomycetaceae is a family of fungi in the order Pleosporales. Described as new to science in 2010, the family contains seven genera.

== Genera ==
As accepted by Wijayawardene et al. 2020 (with number of species);

- Aquimassariosphaeria W. Dong & Doilom (2)
- Arundellina Wanas., E.B.G. Jones & K.D. Hyde (1)
- Clohesyomyces K.D. Hyde (1)
- Hongkongmyces C.C.C. Tsang, J.F.W. Chan, Trend.-Sm., A.H.Y. Ngan, I.W.H. Ling, S.K.P. Lau & P.C.Y. Woo (5)
- Lindgomassariosphaeria W. Dong, H. Zhang & K.D. Hyde (1)
- Lindgomyces K. Hiray., Kaz. Tanaka & Shearer (14)
- Lolia Abdel-Aziz & Abdel-Wahab (1)
- Neolindgomyces Jayasiri, E.B.G. Jones & K.D. Hyde (4)
