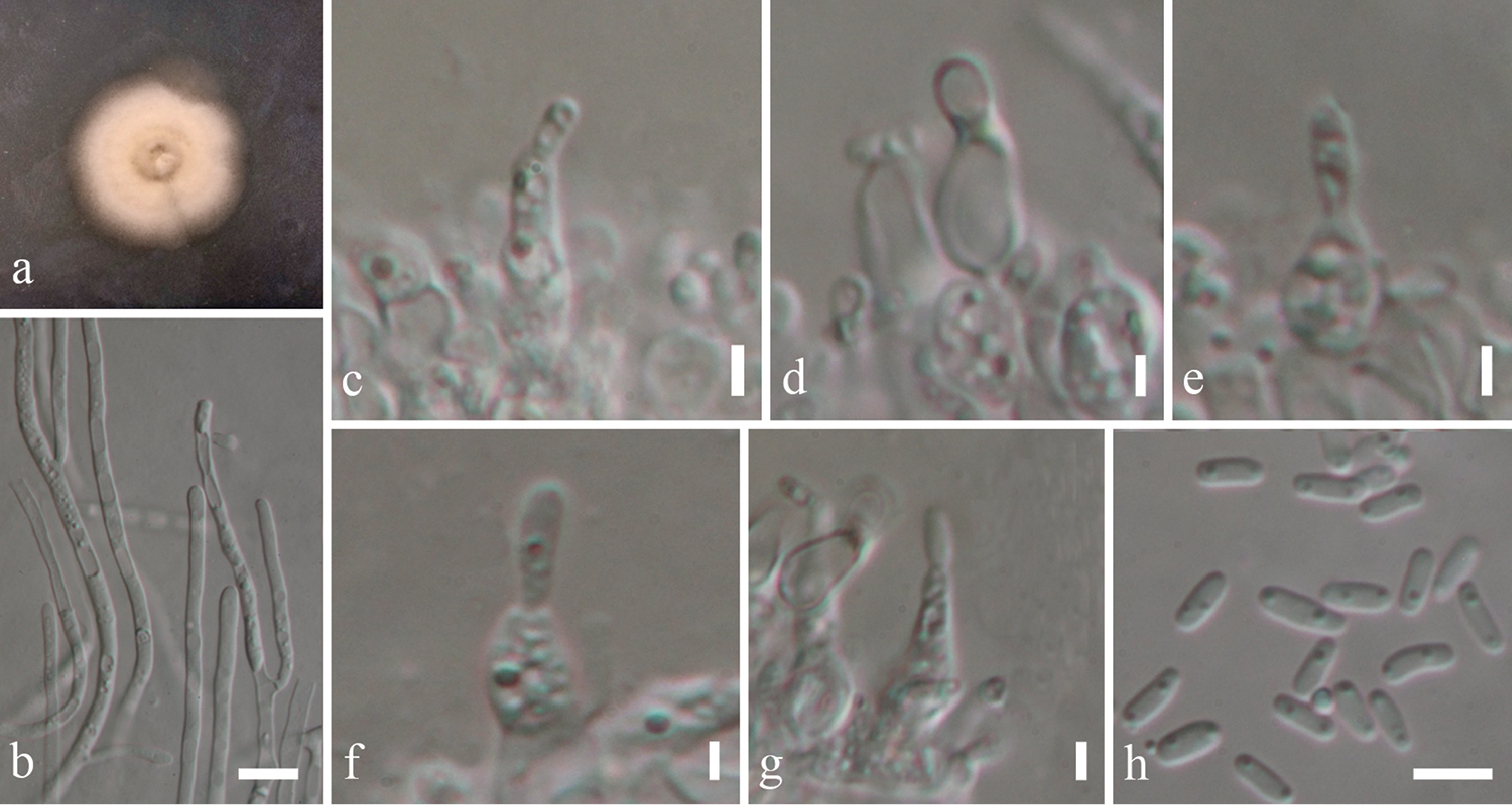
- Features of M. pandanicola

Scientific classification
- Domain: Eukaryota
- Kingdom: Fungi
- Division: Ascomycota
- Class: Dothideomycetes
- Order: Pleosporales
- Family: Massarinaceae
- Genus: Massarina; Sacc. (1883)

Type species
- Massarina eburnea (Tul. & C.Tul.) Sacc. (1883)

Synonyms
- Massarinula Géneau (1894); Holstiella Henn. (1895); Pseudodiaporthe Speg. (1909); Phragmosperma Theiss. & Syd. (1917); Parasphaeria Syd. (1924); Abaphospora Kirschst. (1939)

= Massarina =

Genus of fungi

Massarina is a genus of fungi in the Massarinaceae family. Anamorph forms of species in Massarina include Acrocalymma, Ceratophoma, and Tetraploa. Massarina was circumscribed by Pier Andrea Saccardo in 1883. The widespread genus contains about 100 species.

The genus name of Massarina is in honour of Giuseppe Filippo Massara (1792-1839), who was an Italian doctor and botanist, working in Sondrio.

== Species ==
As accepted by Species Fungorum;

- Massarina adeana (Petr.) E. Müll. (1962)
- Massarina albiziae S. Ahmad (1971)
- Massarina albocarnis (Ellis & Everh.) M.E. Barr (1992)
- Massarina almeidana Sousa da Câmara (1929)
- Massarina alpina Katum. (1981)
- Massarina ambigua (Berl. & Bres.) O.E. Erikss. (1992)
- Massarina australiensis K.D. Hyde (1992)
- Massarina australis S.K. Bose (1961)
- Massarina azadirachticola Purohit & S.P. Joshi (1982)
- Massarina beaurivagea Poonyth, K.D. Hyde, Aptroot & Peerally (1999)
- Massarina berchemiae Petr. (1952)
- Massarina biconica Petch (1922)
- Massarina bosei A. Pande & V.G. Rao (1990)
- Massarina brunaudii S.K. Bose (1961)
- Massarina capensis Marinc., M.J. Wingf. & Crous (2008)
- Massarina capparicola A.K. Kar & Maity (1970)
- Massarina carolinensis Kohlm., Volkm.-Kohlm. & O.E. Erikss. (1996)
- Massarina chrysopogonis G.F. Atk. (1897)
- Massarina cisti S.K. Bose (1961)
- Massarina clypeata (Petr.) E. Müll. (1962)
- Massarina coccifera S.K. Bose (1961)
- Massarina coffeae (Speg.) S.K. Bose (1961)
- Massarina coffeicola (Speg.) S.K. Bose (1961)
- Massarina colebrookeae Srinivas. & P.G. Sathe (1974)
- Massarina coniferarum Butin (1986)
- Massarina constricta Kaz. Tanaka & Y. Harada (2003)
- Massarina contraria (Syd.) Arx & E. Müll. (1975)
- Massarina cosmicola Chipl. (1969)
- Massarina cystophorae (Cribb & J.W. Herb.) Kohlm. & E. Kohlm. (1979)
- Massarina dianthi Riofrio (1929)
- Massarina dickasonii (Wehm.) S. Ahmad (1969)
- Massarina dryopteridis S.K. Bose (1961)
- Massarina dubia (Wehm. & S. Ahmad) S. Ahmad (1969)
- Massarina eburnea (Tul. & C. Tul.) Sacc. (1883)
- Massarina episporiata Z.Q. Yuan & M.E. Barr (1994)
- Massarina eucalypti L.A. Kantsch. (1928)
- Massarina eugeniae Srinivas. & P.G. Sathe (1974)
- Massarina floridana Petr. (1951)
- Massarina graminicola Mundk. & S. Ahmad (1946)
- Massarina grandispora Joanne E. Taylor, K.D. Hyde & E.B.G. Jones (2003)
- Massarina himalayensis E. Müll. (1958)
- Massarina igniaria (C. Booth) Aptroot (1998)
- Massarina immersa Döbbeler (1978)
- Massarina indigoferae (E. Müll. & S. Ahmad) Boise (1985)
- Massarina japonica Kaz. Tanaka & Y. Harada (2003)
- Massarina jasminicola T.S. Viswan. (1960)
- Massarina juniperi S.K. Bose (1961)
- Massarina kamatii Tilak & Jadhav (1972)
- Massarina lacertensis Kohlm. & Volkm.-Kohlm. (1991)
- Massarina lantanae C. Ramesh (1993)
- Massarina leucadendri Marinc., M.J. Wingf. & Crous (2008)
- Massarina leucosarca (Ellis & Everh.) M.E. Barr (1992)
- Massarina lonicerae S.K. Bose & E. Müll. (1967)
- Massarina maritima S.K. Bose (1961)
- Massarina mauritiana Poonyth, K.D. Hyde, Aptroot & Peerally (1999)
- Massarina microspora Pass. (1891)
- Massarina moeszii Tóth (1961)
- Massarina mori (Fabre) Boise (1985)
- Massarina mucosa Panwar & S.J. Kaur (1977)
- Massarina neesii (Körb.) L. Holm (2012)
- Massarina nigroviridula Rehm (1914)
- Massarina oleicola A. Pande & V.G. Rao (1990)
- Massarina oleina S. Ahmad (1972)
- Massarina operculicola M. Morelet (1980)
- Massarina oplismeni Katum. & Y. Harada (1979)
- Massarina orientalis (Wehm. & S. Ahmad) S. Ahmad (1969)
- Massarina pandanicola Tibpromma & K.D. Hyde (2018)
- Massarina parasitica S.K. Bose & E. Müll. (1965)
- Massarina peerallyi K.D. Hyde & Aptroot (1998)
- Massarina phragmiticola Poon & K.D. Hyde (1998)
- Massarina piskorzii (Petr.) Boise (1985)
- Massarina plumigera (Ellis & Everh.) Sacc. & Trotter (1913)
- Massarina polycarpa (Füisting) Sacc. & Traverso (1911)
- Massarina polytrichadelphi Döbbeler (2007)
- Massarina pomacearum Höhn. (1917)
- Massarina psidii Chona, Munjal & J.N. Kapoor (1957)
- Massarina pusillispora (Scheuer) Scheuer (1999)
- Massarina pustulata I. Hino & Katum. (1955)
- Massarina quercina (Géneau) E. Müll. (1962)
- Massarina raimundoi Rehm (1914)
- Massarina rhopalosperma (Kirschst.) E. Müll. (1962)
- Massarina ricifera Kohlm., Volkm.-Kohlm. & O.E. Erikss. (1995)
- Massarina rupicola (Sacc.) Y.M. Ahn & Shearer (1995)
- Massarina ryukyuensis (I. Hino & Katum.) Kaz. Tanaka & Y. Harada (2003)
- Massarina salicincola Rehm (1906)
- Massarina salicis-capreae (Roum.) Y.M. Ahn & Shearer (1999)
- Massarina sanguineo-ostiolata Aptroot, J. Fröhl. & K.D. Hyde (2000)
- Massarina sarcostemmatis K. Ramakr. (1953)
- Massarina sivanesanii Subhedar & V.G. Rao (1986)
- Massarina spectabilis Ade (1923)
- Massarina spiraeae S.K. Bose (1961)
- Massarina submediana Kaz. Tanaka & Y. Harada (2003)
- Massarina syringae Kirschst. (1935)
- Massarina tangneyae Y.P. Tan, Bishop-Hurley, Bransgr. & R.G. Shivas (2022)
- Massarina taphrina (Fr.) O.E. Erikss. (1992)
- Massarina tiliae (W. Phillips & Plowr.) Sacc. (1883)
- Massarina tricellula Panwar & S.J. Kaur (1975)
- Massarina uniserialis Kaz. Tanaka & Y. Harada (2003)
- Massarina usambarensis (Henn.) Höhn. (1910)
- Massarina waikanaensis (G.S. Ridl.) Shoemaker & C.E. Babc. (1989)
