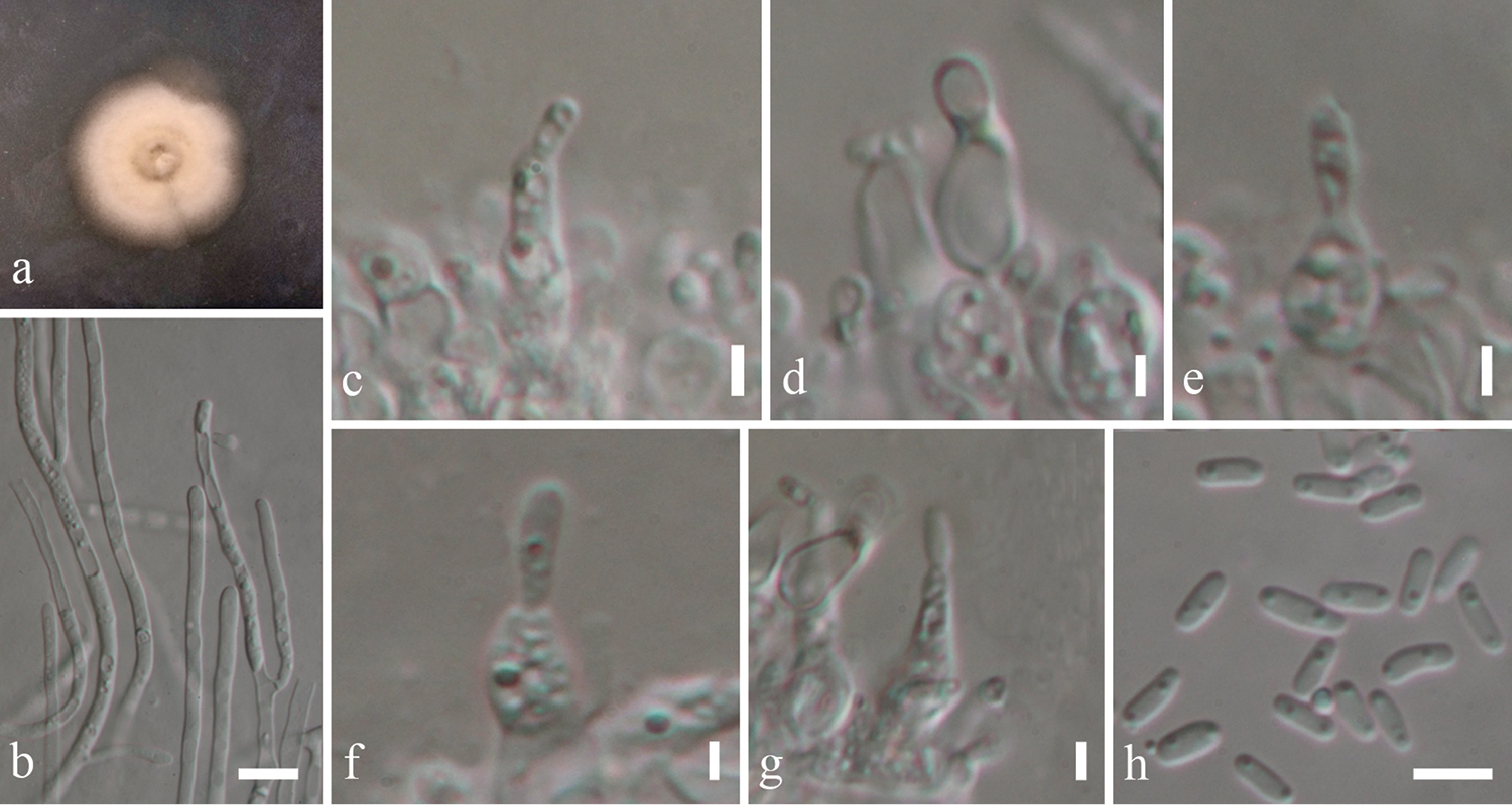
- Massarina pandanicola holotype. a Colony on MEA media. b Mycelium masses. c–g Conidia and conidiogenous cells. h Conidia. Scale bars: 20 μm (b), 2 μm (c–g), 5 μm (h)

Scientific classification
- Kingdom: Fungi
- Division: Ascomycota
- Class: Dothideomycetes
- Order: Pleosporales
- Family: Massarinaceae; Munk (1956)

Type genus
- Massarina Sacc. (1883)

= Massarinaceae =

Family of fungi

The Massarinaceae are a family of fungi in the order Pleosporales. Although taxa have a cosmopolitan distribution, they are better-known in temperate regions. They are thought to be saprobic in wood and bark; some species are weak pathogens.

In 2013, Quaedvlieg and colleagues expanded this family with the genus Stagonospora by showing that the type of the genus (Stagonospora paludosa) actually clustered inside the Massarinaceae and not in the Phaeosphaeriaceae as was previously assumed. Subsequently, Stagonospora, which has several important pathogens on grasses (e.g. Stagonospora nodorum and S. avenae), was renamed Parastagonospora.

== Genera ==
As accepted by Wijayawardene et al. 2020 (with amounts of species);

- Byssothecium Fuckel (1861) (8)
- Helminthosporiella Konta & K.D.Hyde (2021) (1)
- Helminthosporium Link (1809) (ca. 416)
- Massarina Sacc. (1883) (ca. 100)
- Mirohelminthosporium K. Zhang, D.W. Li & R.F. Castañeda (1)
- Pseudodiaporthe Speg. (1909)
- Pseudodidymosphaeria Thambug. & K.D.Hyde (2015) (2)
- Pseudosplanchnonema Chethana & K.D. Hyde (1)
- Semifissispora H.J. Swart (5)
- Stagonospora (Sacc.) Sacc. (220)
- Suttonomyces Wijayaw., Camporesi & K.D. Hyde (2)
