= Lophiostomataceae =

Scientific classification
- Kingdom: Fungi
- Division: Ascomycota
- Class: Dothideomycetes
- Order: Pleosporales
- Family: Lophiostomataceae; Sacc. (1883)

Family of fungi

The Lophiostomataceae are a family of fungi in the order Pleosporales. Taxa have a widespread distribution, especially in temperate regions, and are saprobic or necrotrophic on herbaceous and woody stems.

The family Lophiostomataceae was thought to be heterogeneous or paraphyletic, but recent phylogenetic analyses support the monophyletic status of Lophiostomataceae sensu stricto (Mugambi and Huhndorf 2009; Zhang et al. 2012; Hyde et al. 2013; Wijayawardene et al. 2014,). In their multi-gene analysis, Schoch et al. (2006, 2009,) showed Lophiostomataceae to belong in Pleosporales.

Zhang et al. (2009), showed that Lophiostoma, Lophiotrema and Massarina formed well-supported subclades in Pleosporales.

== Genera ==
As accepted by Wijayawardene et al. 2020 (with amount of species);

- Alpestrisphaeria Thambug. & K.D. Hyde (2)
- Biappendiculispora Thambug., Kaz. Tanaka & K.D. Hyde (1)
- Capulatispora Thambug. & K.D. Hyde (1)
- Coelodictyosporium Thambug. & K.D. Hyde (3)
- Crassiclypeus A. Hashim., K. Hiray. & Kaz. Tanaka (1)
- Desertiserpentica Maharachch., Wanas. & Al-Sadi (1)
- Dimorphiopsis Crous (1)
- Flabellascoma A. Hashim., K. Hiray. & Kaz. Tanaka (4)
- Guttulispora Thambug., Qing Tian & K.D. Hyde (1)
- Kiskunsagia D.G. Knapp, Imrefi & Kovács (1)
- Lentistoma A. Hashim., K. Hiray. & Kaz. Tanaka (2)
- Leptoparies A. Hashim., K. Hiray. & Kaz. Tanaka (1)
- Lophiohelichrysum Dayar., Camporesi & K.D. Hyde (1)
- Lophiomurispora Wanas. & Mortimer (1)
- Lophiopoacea Ariyaw., Thambug. & K.D. Hyde (2)
- Lophiostoma Ces. & De Not. (ca. 100)
- Magnopulchromyces L.B. Conc., Gusmão & R.F. Castañeda (1)
- Neopaucispora Wanas., Gafforov & K.D. Hyde (2)
- Neotrematosphaeria Thambug., Kaz. Tanaka & K.D. Hyde (1)
- Neovaginatispora A. Hashim., K. Hiray. & Kaz. Tanaka (2)
- Parapaucispora A. Hashim., K. Hiray. & Kaz. Tanaka (1)
- Paucispora Thambug., Kaz. Tanaka & K.D. Hyde (3)
- Platystomum Trevis. (ca. 20)
- Pseudocapulatispora Mapook & K.D. Hyde (2)
- Pseudolophiostoma Thambug., Kaz. Tanaka & K.D. Hyde (5)
- Pseudopaucispora A. Hashim., K. Hiray. & Kaz. Tanaka (1)
- Pseudoplatystomum Thambug. & K.D. Hyde (1)
- Quintaria Kohlm. & Volkm.-Kohlm (3)
- Sigarispora Thambug. & K.D. Hyde (18)
- Vaginatispora K.D. Hyde (8)
