= List of fungi of South Africa – H =

This is an alphabetical list of the fungal taxa as recorded from South Africa. Currently accepted names have been appended.

== Ha ==
Genus: Hadotrichum

- Hadotrichum phragmitis Fuck.

Genus: Haematomma (Lichens)

- Haematomma coccineum Korb. var. porphyricum Th.Fr.
- Haematomma fenzlianum Massal
- Haematomma fenzlianum var. pulvinare Zahlbr.
- Haematomma puniceum Massal.
- Haematomma puniceum f. rufopallens Wain.
- Haematomma puniceum var. africanum Steiner.
- Haematomma puniceum var. breviculum Zahlbr.
- Haematomma puniceum var. collatum Zahlbr.
- Haematomma puniceum var. rufidulum Zahlbr.
- Haematomma puniceum var. subarthonioideum Zahlbr.

Genus: Hamaspora (Rusts)

- Hamaspora longissima Koem.

Genus: Hanseniospora

- Hanseniospora guillermondii Pijper.

Genus: Haplodothella

- Haplodothella chaenostoma Werd.

Genus: Haplodothis

- Haplodothis chaenostoma Theiss.

Genus: Haploravenelia

- Haploravenelia baumiana Syd.
- Haploravenelia inornata Diet.
- Haploravenelia natalensis Diet.

Genus: Haplosporangium

- Haplosporangium bisporale Thaxt.

Genus: Haplosporella

- Haplosporella hesperidica Speg.
- Haplosporella mali Petrak & Syd.

Genus: Harknessia

- Harknessia uromycoides Speg.

== He ==
Genus: Helbeloma

- Helbeloma nudipes Karst.
- Helbeloma spoliatum Gill.

Genus: Helicobasidium

- Helicobasidium compactum Boedyn.
- Helicobasidium mompa Tan.
- Helicobasidium purpureum Pat.

Genus: Helicomyces

- Helicomyces cinereus Mass.

Genus: Helminthocarpon

- Helminthocarpon natalense Vain.

Genus: Helminthosporium

- Helminthosporium accedens Syd.
- Helminthosporium bicolor Mitra.
- Helminthosporium brizae Nisikado.
- Helminthosporium capense Thuem.
- Helminthosporium crustaceum P.Henn.
- Helminthosporium cynodontis Marign.
- Helminthosporium dematoideum Bubak & Wrobl.
- Helminthosporium dolichi Syd.
- Helminthosporium dorycarpum Mont. (group)
- Helminthosporium gramineum Rabenh.
- Helminthosporium halodes Drechsl.
- Helminthosporium leersii Atk.
- Helminthosporium leucostylum Drechsl.
- Helminthosporium miyakei Nisikado.
- Helminthosporium oryzai Breda de Haan.
- Helminthosporium palmetto Gerard
- Helminthosporium ravenelii Berk. & Curt.
- Helminthosporium rostratum Drechsl.
- Helminthosporium sacchari Butler.
- Helminthosporium sativum Pammel, King & Bakke.
- Helminthosporium sigmoideum Cab.
- Helminthosporium stenospilum Drechsl.
- Helminthosporium teres Sacc.
- Helminthosporium turcicum Pass.
- Helminthosporium sp.

Family: Helotiaceae

Order:Helotiales

Genus: Helotium

- Helotium aeruginosum Fr.
- Helotium capense Kalchbr. & Cooke
- Helotium claro-flavum Berk.
- Helotium conformatum Karst.
- Helotium epihyllum Fr.
- Helotium ferrugineum Fr.
- Helotium purpuraturn Kalchbr.
- Helotium scutellatum Kalchbr. & Cooke

Genus: Helvella

- Helvella mitra Linn.

Family: Helvellaceae

Genus: Hemiarcyria

- Hemiarcyria clavata Rost.

Family: Hemihysteriae

Genus: Hemileia

- Hemileia ancylanthi Syd.
- Hemileia canthii Berk. & Br.
- Hemileia evansii Syd.
- Hemileia fadogiae Syd.
- Hemileia scholzii Syd.
- Hemileia vastatrix Berk. & Br.
- Hemileia woodii Kalchbr. & Cooke

Family: Hemisphaericeae

Genus: Hendersonia

- Hendersonia magnoliae Sacc.
- Hendersonia osteospermi Wakef.
- Hendersonia rubi West.
- Hendersonia sparsa Wint.
- Hendersonia wistariae Cooke

Genus: Hendersonula

- Hendersonula toruloidea Nattrass.

Genus: Heppia (Lichens)

- Heppia azurea Vain
- Heppia guepini Nyl.
- Heppia guepini var. nigrolimbata Nyl
- Heppia mossamedana Wain
- Heppia nigrolimbata Nyl.

Family: Heppiaceae

Genus: Heterochaete

- Heterochaete andina Pat. & Lagerh.

Family: Heterodermaceae

Genus: Heterosporium

- Heterosporium avenae Oud.
- Heterosporium echinuiatum Cooke
- Heterosporium gracile Sacc.
- Heterosporium groenlandicum Allesch.
- Heterosporium munduleae Syd.
- Heterosporium ornithogali Klotzsch.
- Heterosporium secalis Dipp.

Genus: Heterothecium

- Heterothecium marine Müll.Arg.

Genus: Hexagona

- Hexagona albida Berk.
- Hexagona crinigera Fr.
- Hexagona decipiens Berk.
- Hexagona dermatiphora Lloyd.
- Hexagona discopoda Pat. & Har.
- Hexagona dregeana Lev.
- Hexagona dybowskii Pat.
- Hexagona friesiana Speg.
- Hexagona glabra Lev.
- Hexagona hystrix Har. & Pat.
- Hexagona orbiculata Fr.
- Hexagona peltata Fr.
- Hexagona phaeopora Pat.
- Hexagona pobeguini Har.
- Hexagona polygramma Mont. ex Fr.
- Hexagona rigida Berk.
- Hexagona sacleuxii Har.
- Hexagona similis Berk.
- Hexagona sinensis Fr.
- Hexagona speciosa Fr.
- Hexagona stuhlmanni P.Henn.
- Hexagona subvelutina Wakef.
- Hexagona tenuis Fr.
- Hexagona tenuis var. natalensis Fr.
- Hexagona thollonis Pat. & Har.
- Hexagona tricolor Fr.
- Hexagona umbrinella Fr.
- Hexagona zambesiana Torrend.

== Hi ==
Genus: Himantia

- Himantia stellifera Johnston.

Genus: Hirneola

- Hirneola auricula-judae Berk.
- Hirneola auricularis Fr.
- Hirneola auriformis Fr.
- Hirneola cochleata Fr.
- Hirneola delicata Bres.
- Hirneola fusco-succinea P.Henn.
- Hirneola hemispierica Fr.
- Hirneola nigra Fr.
- Hirneola nigra var. fusco-succinea Fr.
- Hirneola rufa Fr.
- Hirneola polytricha Mont.
- Hirneola squamosa Lloyd.
- Hirneola vitellina Fr.

Genus: Histoplasma

- Histoplasma capsulatum Darling.

== Ho ==
Genus: Holstiella

- Holstiella usambarensis P.Henn.

Genus: Homostegia

- Homostegia albizziae Herl. & Vogl.
- Homostegia amphimelaena Sacc.
- Homostegia piggottii Karst.

Genus: Hormodendron

- Hormodendron cladosporioides Sacc.
- Hormodendron pedrosoi Brumpt.
- Hormodendron resinae Lindau.

Genus: Hormomyces

- Hormomyces aurantiacus Bon.
- Hormomyces calloriodies Sacc.

== Hu ==
Genus: Humaria

- Humaria epitricha Berk.

Genus: Humarina

- Humarina leucoloma Seaver.
- Humarina sp.

== Hy ==
Genus: Hyalinia

- Hyalinia crystallina Boud.

Genus: Hyalodema

- Hyalodema evansii Magn.

Family: Hyaloscyphaceae

Family: Hydnaceae

Genus: Hydnangium

- Hydnangium cameum Wallr.
- Hydnangium nigricans Kalchbr.

Genus: Hydnum

- Hydnum ambiguum Berk. & Br.
- Hydnum auriscalpium Linn, ex Fr.
- Hydnum cinnabarinum Fr.
- Hydnum coralloides Scop, ex Fr.
- Hydnum tiavidum Lloyd.
- Hydnum henningsii Bres.
- Hydnum longispinosum Lloyd ex v.d.Bvl
- Hydnum mucidum Pers.
- Hydnum ochraceum Pers. ex Fr.
- Hydnum pudorinum Fr.
- Hydnum pulcher Lloyd
- Hydnum pulchrum Lloyd
- Hydnum sclerodontium Berk. & Mont.
- Hydnum setosum Bres.

Genus: Hydrophora

- Hydrophora stercoraria Tode.

Genus: Hygrophorus

- Hygrophorus atro-coccineus Kalchbr.
- Hygrophorus coccineus Fr.
- Hygrophorus conicus Fr.
- Hygrophorus discolor Kalchbr. & MacOwan
- Hygrophorus virgineus Fr.

Genus: Hymenochaete

- Hymenochaete dregeana Mass.
- Hymenochaete fasciculata Talbot.
- Hymenochaete fulva Burt.
- Hymenochaete fusco-violascens v.d.Byl.
- Hymenochaete luteo-badia v.Hohn. & Litsch
- Hymenochaete nigricans Bres.
- Hymenochaete ochromarginata Talbot.
- Hymenochaete pellicula Berk. & Br.
- Hymenochaete rubiginosa Lev.
- Hymenochaete semistupposa Petch.
- Hymenochaete tabacina Lev.
- Hymenochaete tabacina var. australis Mont.
- Hymenochaete tenuissima Berk.
- Hymenochaete tristicula Mass.

Genus: Hymenogaster

- Hymenogaster albellus Mass. & Rodway.
- Hymenogaster arenarius Tul.
- Hymenogaster levisporus Mass. & Rodway.
- Hymenogaster lilacinus Tul.
- Hymenogaster radiatus Lloyd
- Hymenogaster zeylanicus Petch.

Family: Hymenogastraceae

Order:Hymenogastrales

Order:Hymenomycetales

Family: Hymenomyceteae

Genus: Hyphaster

- Hyphaster kutuensis P.Henn.

Genus: Hyphoderma

- Hyphoderma laetum Karst.

Genus: Hypholoma

- Hypholoma candolleanum Quel.
- Hypholoma capnolepis Sacc.
- Hypholoma capnoides Quel.
- Hypholoma fasciculare Quel.
- Hypholoma hydrophilum Quel.
- Hypholoma noli-tangere Fr.

Family: Hypochnaceae

Genus: Hypochnus

- Hypochnus evlesii v.d.Byl.
- Hypochnus puniceus Sacc.

Genus: Hypocrea

- Hypocrea camea Kalchbr. & Cooke.
- Hypocrea chrysostigrna Kalchbr. & Cooke.
- Hypocrea citrina Fr.
- Hypocrea inandae Cooke
- Hypocrea lycogalae Kalchbr. & Cooke
- Hypocrea rufa Fr.
- Hypocrea subcitrina Kalchbr. & Cooke
- Hypocrea sulphurella Kalchbr. & Cooke
- Hypocrea traehycarpa Syd.
- Hypocrea sp.

Family:Hypocreaceae

Genus: Hypomyces

- Hypomyces chrysospermus Tul.
- Hypomyces ipomoeae Wollenw.

Genus: Hyponectria

- Hyponectria sutherlandiae Theiss.

Genus: Hypoxylon

- Hypoxylon africanum v.d.Byl
- Hypoxylon annulatum Mont.
- Hypoxylon argillaceum Fr.
- Hypoxylon cetrarioides Welw. & Curr.
- Hypoxylon clypeus Schw.
- Hypoxylon colliculosum Nitschke.
- Hypoxylon concentricum Fr.
- Hypoxylon cornutum Hoffm.
- Hypoxylon deustum (Hoffm.) Grev., (1828), accepted as Kretzschmaria deusta (Hoffm.) P.M.D.Martin, (1970)
- Hypoxylon exutans Cooke.
- Hypoxylon fuscum Fr.
- Hypoxylon gilletianum Sacc.
- Hypoxylon glomeratum Cooke.
- Hypoxylon haematostroma Mont.
- Hypoxylon hypomiltum Mont.
- Hypoxylon kalchbrenneri Sacc.
- Hypoxylon lepidum v.d.Byl.
- Hypoxylon malleolus Berk. & Rav.
- Hypoxylon mediterraneum Miller.
- Hypoxylon multiforme Fr.
- Hypoxylon natalense Berk.
- Hypoxylon placenta Kalchbr.
- Hypoxylon punctulatum Berk. & Rav.
- Hypoxylon rubiginosum Pers. ex Ft.
- Hypoxylon serpens (Pers.) Fr., (1835), accepted as Nemania serpens (Pers.) Gray, (1821)
- Hypoxylon stygium Sacc.
- Hypoxylon suborbiculare Welw. & Curr.
- Hypoxylon truncatum Miller.

Genus: Hypsilophora

- Hypsilophora calloeioides Kalchbr. & Cooke

Genus: Hysterangium

- Hysterangium niger Lloyd

Family: Hysteriaceae

Order: Hysteriales

Genus: Hysterographium

- Hysterographium acaciae Doidge
- Hysterographium fraxini de Not. var. oleastri Desm.
- Hysterographium spinicolum Doidge

Genus: Hysterostoma

- Hysterostoma acocantherae Theiss. & Syd.
- Hysterostoma areolata Nel.
- Hysterostoma capense Syd.
- Hysterostoma colae Hansf.
- Hysterostoma faureae Doidge.
- Hysterostoma microspora Doidge.
- Hysterostoma orbiculata Syd.

Genus: Hysterostomella

- Hysterostomella bosciae Doidge.
- Hysterostomella concentrica Syd.
- Hysterostomella opaca Doidge
- Hysterostomella oxyanthae Doidge
- Hysterostomella tenella Syd.

Genus: Hysteromina

- Hysteromina euclea v.d.Byl.
- Hysteromina opaca Syd.
- Hysteromina oxyanthae Doidge
- Hysteromina tenella Syd.

== See also ==
- List of bacteria of South Africa
- List of Oomycetes of South Africa
- List of slime moulds of South Africa
- List of fungi of South Africa
  - List of fungi of South Africa – A
  - List of fungi of South Africa – B
  - List of fungi of South Africa – C
  - List of fungi of South Africa – D
  - List of fungi of South Africa – E
  - List of fungi of South Africa – F
  - List of fungi of South Africa – G
  - List of fungi of South Africa – H
  - List of fungi of South Africa – I
  - List of fungi of South Africa – J
  - List of fungi of South Africa – K
  - List of fungi of South Africa – L
  - List of fungi of South Africa – M
  - List of fungi of South Africa – N
  - List of fungi of South Africa – O
  - List of fungi of South Africa – P
  - List of fungi of South Africa – Q
  - List of fungi of South Africa – R
  - List of fungi of South Africa – S
  - List of fungi of South Africa – T
  - List of fungi of South Africa – U
  - List of fungi of South Africa – V
  - List of fungi of South Africa – W
  - List of fungi of South Africa – X
  - List of fungi of South Africa – Y
  - List of fungi of South Africa – Z
