= Helicobasidium longisporum =

Scientific classification
- Domain: Eukaryota
- Kingdom: Fungi
- Division: Basidiomycota
- Class: Pucciniomycetes
- Order: Helicobasidiales
- Family: Helicobasidiaceae
- Genus: Helicobasidium
- Species: H. longisporum

Binomial name
- Helicobasidium longisporum Wakef. (1917)

Synonyms
- Helicobasidium mompa f. macrosporum Hara (1917); Septobasidium compactum Boedijn (1926); Helicobasidium compactum (Boedijn) Boedijn (1930)

Species of fungus

Helicobasidium longisporum is a species of fungus in the subdivision Pucciniomycotina. Basidiocarps (fruit bodies) are corticioid (patch-forming) and are typically violet to purple. Microscopically they have auricularioid (laterally septate) basidia. Helicobasidium longisporum is an opportunistic plant pathogen and is one of the causes of violet root rot of crops and other plants. DNA sequencing suggests that it is a complex of more than one species.

== Taxonomy ==
Helicobasidium longisporum was first described from Uganda in 1917 by British mycologist Elsie Wakefield to accommodate a species similar to Helicobasidium purpureum but with elongated basidiospores. It was found parasitizing roots of cocoa (Theobroma cacao). A similarly long-spored Japanese taxon was described as H. mompa f. macrosporum and a further long-spored species was subsequently described from Indonesia as H. compactum. All three were considered conspecific in a 1999 study.

In 1955 Japanese mycologist Seiya Ito synonymized H. mompa f. macrosporum and H. compactum with a short-spored species, Helicobasidium mompa. As a result, at least some subsequent references to H. mompa refer to a long—spored species.

Initial molecular research, based on cladistic analysis of DNA sequences, indicates that at least two species occur in the H.longisporum complex, one in Europe (together with its Tuberculina anamorph) and one in Africa and the Americas (also with its anamorph).

== Description ==
Basidiocarps are corticioid smooth, membranaceous, purple to purple-brown. Microscopically the hyphae are easily visible, 5–8 μm diam., brownish-purple, and lack clamp connections. Basidia are tubular, curved or crook-shaped, and auricularioid (laterally septate). Basidiospores are elongated clavate, mostly 16–25 x 4.5–6 μm.

== Distribution ==
Helicobasidium longisporum has been recorded from both temperate and tropical areas of Africa, America, Asia, Australia, and Europe. It is reported to cause violet root rot of various crops and a similar collar rot or collar canker of coffee trees.
