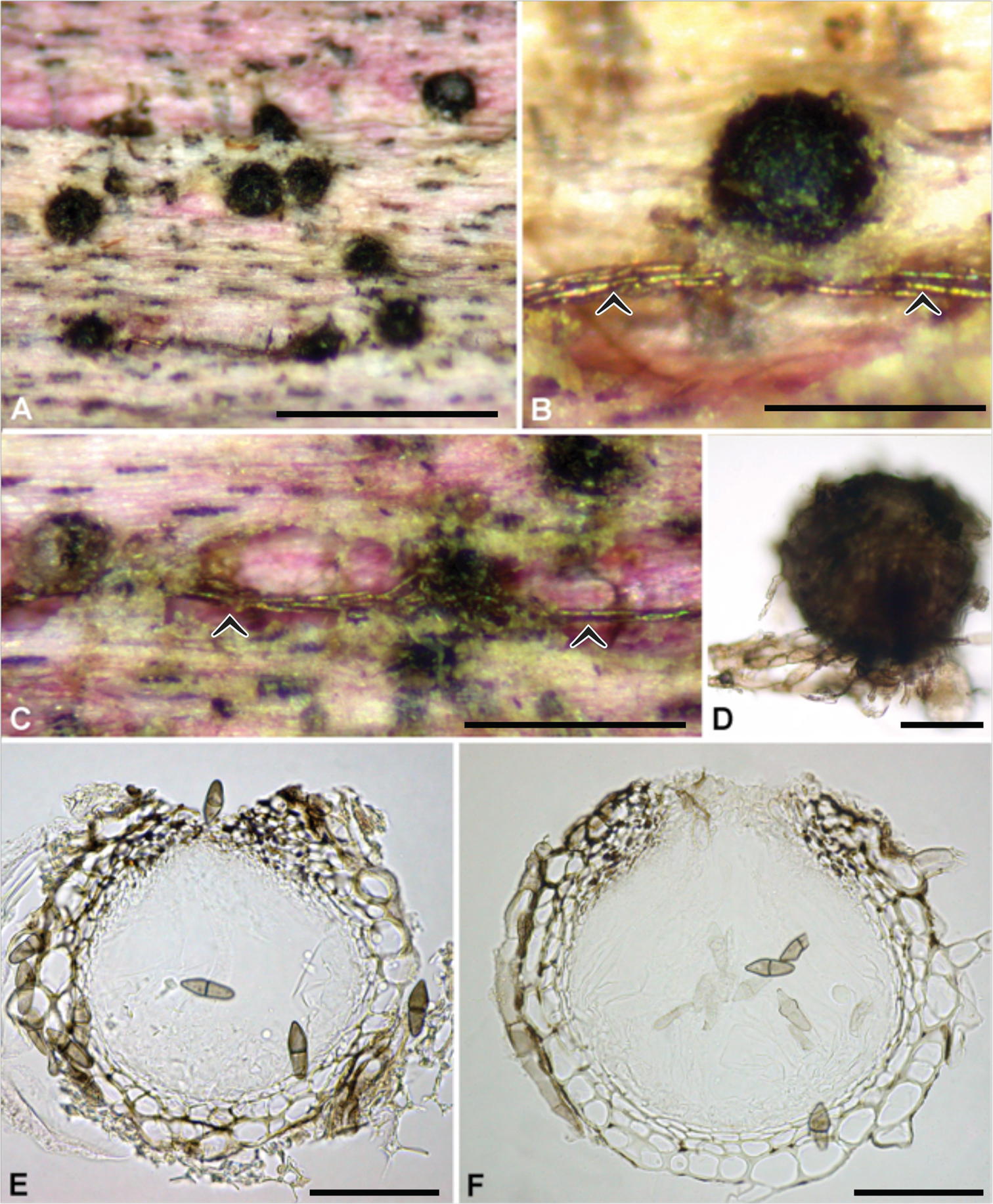
- J. purpurea

Scientific classification
- Kingdom: Fungi
- Division: Ascomycota
- Class: Dothideomycetes
- Order: Jahnulales
- Family: Aliquandostipitaceae
- Genus: Jahnula; Kirschst. (1936)

Type species
- Jahnula aquatica (Plöttn. & Kirschst.) Kirschst. (1936)

= Jahnula =

Genus of fungi

Jahnula is a genus of aquatic fungi in the family Aliquandostipitaceae. The genus was first named by Wilhelm Kirschstein in 1936.

The genus name of Jahnula is in honour of Eduard Adolf Wilhelm Jahn (1871–1942), German botanist (Mycology) and teacher in Berlin.

The genus was circumscribed by Wilhelm Kirschstein in Ann. Mycol. vol.34 on page 196 in 1936.

== Species ==
There are about 15 species;

- Jahnula apiospora
- Jahnula appendiculata
- Jahnula aquatica
- Jahnula australiensis
- Jahnula bipileata
- Jahnula bipolaris
- Jahnula granulosa
- Jahnula morakotii
- Jahnula poonythii
- Jahnula potamophila
- Jahnula purpurea
- Jahnula rostrata
- Jahnula sangamonensis
- Jahnula seychellensis
- Jahnula siamensis
- Jahnula systyla
