= Eduard Jahn =

German biologist and mycologist

Eduard Adolf Wilhelm Jahn (20 May 1871, Berlin – 23 January 1942, Hann. Münden) was a German biologist and mycologist.

== Biography ==
Jahn studied natural sciences at the Humboldt University of Berlin, especially biology, until he received his doctorate in 1894 under Simon Schwendener. Jahn then passed his teaching qualification and taught in Berlin-Charlottenburg at the Oberrealschule until 1921. From 1921 to 1938 he was a full professor of botany and mycology at the Forstakademie Hann. Münden (Forest Academy in Hann. Münden). From 1933 until his retirement in 1938, he headed the Institut für Botanik und technische Mykologie (Institute for Botany and Technical Mycology). His specialty was the Myxomycetes, and he also worked on the myxobacteria. His appointment in 1933 was made in opposition to the proposed appointment of the mycologist Richard Falck, who was Jewish and a member of the DDP.

In November 1933 Jahn signed the Bekenntnis der deutschen Professoren zu Adolf Hitler.

In 1904 Jahn scientifically described the slime mould species Stemonitis flavogenita. In 1906 he published his scientific description of Listerella paradoxa, which is a slime mould species from the class Myxogastria and the only member of its genus, as well as the family Listerelliidae.

== Eponyms ==
The fungal genus Jahnula, circumscribed by Wilhelm Kirschstein in 1936, is named in honor of Jahn and with it the order Jahnulales.

== Selected publications ==
- Jahn, Eduard (1904). Myxomycetenstudien. Berlin: Gebrüder Borntræger. (reprinted from "Myxomycetenstudien". Berichte der Deutschen Botanischen Gesellschaft. XIX (2). 1901.)
- Jahn, Eduard (1924). Beiträge zur botanischen protistologie. Leipzig: Verlag von Gebrüder Borntraeger.

== Sources ==
- Gerhard Wagenitz: Göttinger Biologen 1737–1945: Eine biographisch-bibliographische Liste, Göttingen 1988

The standard author abbreviation E.Jahn may be used to indicate this person when citing a fungal name.
