= Helicobasidium mompa =

Scientific classification
- Domain: Eukaryota
- Kingdom: Fungi
- Division: Basidiomycota
- Class: Pucciniomycetes
- Order: Helicobasidiales
- Family: Helicobasidiaceae
- Genus: Helicobasidium
- Species: H. mompa

Binomial name
- Helicobasidium mompa Nobuj. Tanaka (1891)

Synonyms
- Septobasidium mompa (Nobuj. Tanaka) Racib. (1909); Stypinella mompa (Nobuj. Tanaka) Lindau (1895)

Species of fungus

Helicobasidium mompa is a species of fungus in the subdivision Pucciniomycotina. Basidiocarps (fruit bodies) are corticioid (patch-forming) and are typically violet to purple. Microscopically they have auricularioid (laterally septate) basidia. Helicobasidium mompa is an opportunistic plant pathogen and is one of the causes of violet root rot of crops and other plants. DNA sequencing suggests that it is a distinct, eastern Asian species.

== Taxonomy ==
Helicobasidium mompa was first described in 1891 by Japanese mycologist Nobujiro Tanaka for a species found on mulberry in Japan that was similar to the European Helicobasidium purpureum, but with basidiospores depicted as ovoid and of slightly smaller size. In 1955 Seiya Ito synonymized the long-spored H. mompa f. macrosporum and H. compactum with the short-spored H. mompa. As a result at least some subsequent references to H. mompa refer to a long-spored species. A 1999 study considered H. mompa a nomen dubium (a name of unknown application) because of uncertainty concerning its description and interpretation. Initial molecular research, based on cladistic analysis of DNA sequences, indicates, however, that Japanese and Korean specimens determined as H. mompa form a grouping distinct from those named Helicobasidium longisporum or H. purpureum.

== Description ==
Basidiocarps are corticioid smooth, membranaceous, purple to purple-brown. Microscopically the hyphae are easily visible, 5-8 μm diam., brownish-purple, and lack clamp connections. Basidia are tubular, curved or crook-shaped, and auricularioid (laterally septate). Basidiospores were originally described as ovoid, 10 -12 x 5 -7 μm, but have been re-interpreted as elongated, 10–23 x 4–7.5 μm.

== Distribution ==
Helicobasidium mompa has been recorded mainly from temperate areas of Japan, Korea, and China. It is reported to cause violet root rot of various crops.
