= Patescospora =

Scientific classification
- Kingdom: Fungi
- Division: Ascomycota
- Class: Dothideomycetes
- Order: Jahnulales
- Family: Aliquandostipitaceae
- Genus: Patescospora; Abdel-Wahab & El-Sharouney (2002)

Type species
- Patescospora separans Abdel-Wahab & El-Shar. (2002)

Genus of fungi

Patescospora is a genus of fungi in the Aliquandostipitaceae family. This is a monotypic genus, containing the single species Patescospora separans.
