= Helicobasidium compactum =

Scientific classification
- Domain: Eukaryota
- Kingdom: Fungi
- Division: Basidiomycota
- Class: Pucciniomycetes
- Order: Helicobasidiales
- Family: Helicobasidiaceae
- Genus: Helicobasidium
- Species: H. compactum

Binomial name
- Helicobasidium compactum Boedijn, (1930)

Species of fungus

Helicobasidium compactum is a plant pathogen.
