= Ostreichnion =

Scientific classification
- Kingdom: Fungi
- Division: Ascomycota
- Class: Dothideomycetes
- Order: Hysteriales
- Family: Hysteriaceae
- Genus: Ostreichnion; Duby

Type species
- Ostreichnion americanum Duby

Genus of fungi

Ostreichnion is a genus of fungi in the family Mytilinidiaceae.
