= Aliquandostipite =

Scientific classification
- Kingdom: Fungi
- Division: Ascomycota
- Class: Dothideomycetes
- Order: Jahnulales
- Family: Aliquandostipitaceae
- Genus: Aliquandostipite; Inderb. (2001)

Type species
- Aliquandostipite khaoyaiensis Inderb. (2001)

Species
- A. crystallinus A. khaoyaiensis A. minuta A. siamensis A. sunyatsenii

Genus of fungi

Aliquandostipite is a genus of fungi in the family Aliquandostipitaceae. Species in the genus are saprobic, and grow on decaying wood in aquatic or moist environments. The type genus of the Aliquandostipitaceae, Aliquandostipite was first described by Patrik Inderbitzin and colleagues in 2001.
