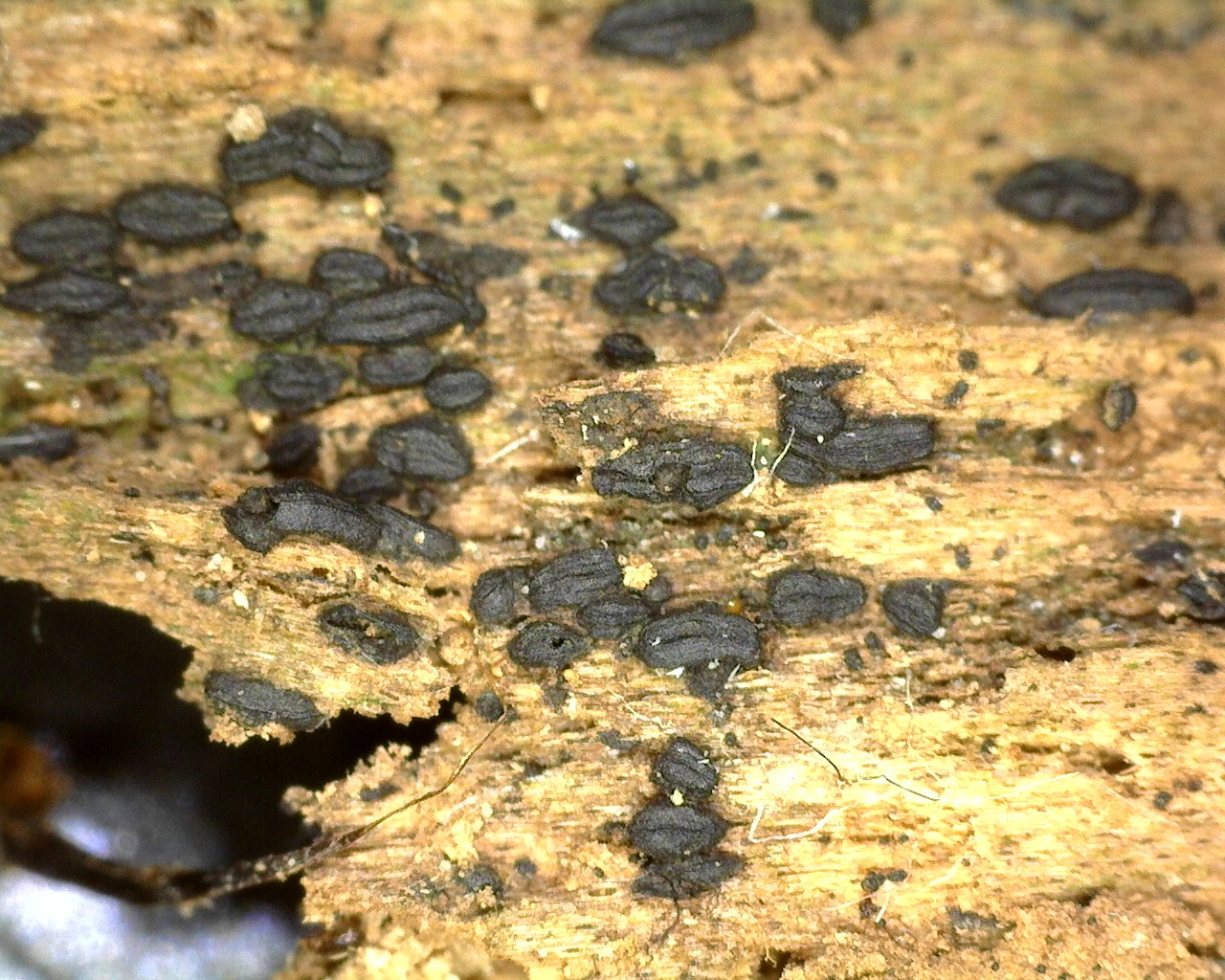
- Hysterium angustatum on decorticated wood near Shimada, Shizuoka, Japan

Scientific classification
- Domain: Eukaryota
- Kingdom: Fungi
- Division: Ascomycota
- Class: Dothideomycetes
- Order: Hysteriales
- Family: Hysteriaceae
- Genus: Hysterium; Pers.

= Hysterium =

Genus of fungi

Hysterium is a genus of fungi belonging to the family Hysteriaceae.

The genus has cosmopolitan distribution.

== Species ==
As accepted by Species Fungorum;

- Hysterium acuminatum Fr. (1820)
- Hysterium adinae R.K. Verma, N. Sharma & Soni (2008)
- Hysterium anaxaeum (Sacc. & D. Sacc.) Höhn. (1917)
- Hysterium anceps Sacc. (1916)
- Hysterium andicola Speg. (1912)
- Hysterium angustatum Pers. (1801)
- Hysterium asymmetricum Checa, Shoemaker & L. Umaña (2007)
- Hysterium atlantis Maire (1937)
- Hysterium barrianum E. Boehm, A.N. Mill., Mugambi, Huhndorf & C.L. Schoch (2009)
- Hysterium batucense Speg. (1910)
- Hysterium betulignum Schwein. (1832)
- Hysterium calabash Seaver (1924)
- Hysterium celastrinum Tilak (1963)
- Hysterium chilense Speg. (1910)
- Hysterium citricola Tilak & R. Rao (1966)
- Hysterium compressum Ellis & Everh. (1902)
- Hysterium conigenum Fr. (1823)
- Hysterium cubense Peck (1912)
- Hysterium cyperi Engelhardt (1908)
- Hysterium gahnianum Rodway (1918)
- Hysterium heveanum Sacc. (1921)
- Hysterium hoyae Henn. (1908)
- Hysterium hyalinum Cooke & Peck (1875)
- Hysterium indicum Seshadri (1965)
- Hysterium inducum Seshadri (1965)
- Hysterium jabalpurense R.K. Verma & N. Sharma (2008)
- Hysterium karstenii M.L. Lohman (1939)
- Hysterium lantanae Tilak & R. Rao (1966)
- Hysterium lavandulae Urries (1941)
- Hysterium lentisci Rolland (1901)
- Hysterium librincola Schwein. (1832)
- Hysterium lineariforme Sacc. (1883)
- Hysterium memecyli Tilak & R. Rao (1966)
- Hysterium ostraceum DC. (1815)
- Hysterium pulcherrimum Tehon & P.A. Young (1924)
- Hysterium pulicare Pers. (1794)
- Hysterium rameale (Fr.) Sacc. & Traverso (1910)
- Hysterium rhizophorae Dayar. & K.D. Hyde (2017)
- Hysterium rosmarini Dias & Sousa da Câmara (1952)
- Hysterium samoense Höhn. (1907)
- Hysterium sinuosum Cooke (1880)
- Hysterium standleyanum Fairm. (1918)
- Hysterium tamarindi Tilak & R. Rao (1966)
- Hysterium thujopsidis Sawada (1952)
- Hysterium velloziae Henn. (1908)
- Hysterium vermiforme Massee (1901)
- Hysterium wallrothii Duby (1861)
