= Acrogenospora =

Scientific classification
- Kingdom: Fungi
- Division: Ascomycota
- Class: Dothideomycetes
- Order: Hysteriales
- Family: Hysteriaceae
- Genus: Acrogenospora; M.B.Ellis (1971)

Type species
- Acrogenospora sphaerocephala (Berk. & Broome) M.B.Ellis (1971)

Genus of fungi

Acrogenospora is a genus of fungi in the family Hysteriaceae. Fossil Acrogenospora have been reported from 12 million years old rocks from central England.

== Species ==
- Acrogenospora gigantospora
- Acrogenospora hainanensis
- Acrogenospora novae-zelandiae
- Acrogenospora ovalis
- Acrogenospora setiformis
- Acrogenospora sphaerocephala
- Acrogenospora subprolata
