= Aliquandostipitaceae =

Scientific classification
- Kingdom: Fungi
- Division: Ascomycota
- Class: Dothideomycetes
- Order: Jahnulales
- Family: Aliquandostipitaceae; Inderb. (2001)

Type genus
- Aliquandostipite Inderb. (2001)

Genera
- Aliquandostipite; Jahnula; Patescospora; Xylomyces

Family of fungi

Aliquandostipitaceae is a family of fungi in the Ascomycota, class Dothideomycetes. The family was described by Patrik Inderbitzin in 2001, and the order Jahnulales was created in 2002 to accommodate the family. The distinguishing characteristic for members of the family are the unusually wide hyphae ("widest hyphae reported in the ascomycetes") that support the spore-bearing structures, and the presence of ascomata both with and without stalks. The genus Aliquandostipe has a pantropical distribution, having been found in Central America and southeast Asia; Jahnula has a wider distribution. Species in the family are saprobic, and are typically found growing on rotting wood.

== Taxonomy ==
The name of the type genus Aliquandostipite is derived from the Latin aliquando meaning sometimes, and stipite with a stalk.

== Description ==
Like other members in the class Dothideomycetes, species of the Aliquandostipitaceae are characterized by having a bilayered ascus wall that develops in what a called a lysogenic cavity; the internal structures of the ascus (the centrum) are contained within a compact hyphal body, called the ascoma. Family Aliquandostipitaceae members are those that have features similar to the holotype genus, Aliquandostipite, which is characterized by having ascomata that are immersed, bursting through the surface (erumpent), or above the surface (superficial). The hamathecium (a general term for tissue between the asci that projects inwards in the internal cavity of the ascus) is made of cells known as pseudoparaphyses, defined as hyphae that originate above the level of the asci and grow downwards between the developing asci. The asci are bitunicate (with differentiated inner and outer walls) or fissitunicate (bitunicate asci with a 'jack-in-the-box' design). The mycelia of the fungus is visible on the substratum (the layer immediately under the growing surface), and made up of thick hyphae (up to 50 μm wide) that may bear ascomata.

== Distribution and habitat ==
Species in the type genus Aliquandostipite have been found in tropical locales including Khao Yai National Park, Thailand, and Guangdong Province in China, on branches and sticks either lying on the ground or submerged in water. Species in the genera Patescospora and Jahnula have been found in Egypt, Thailand, and China; in 2006, several new Jahnula species were found in North and Central America.
