= Simon Schwendener =

Swiss botanist (1829–1919)

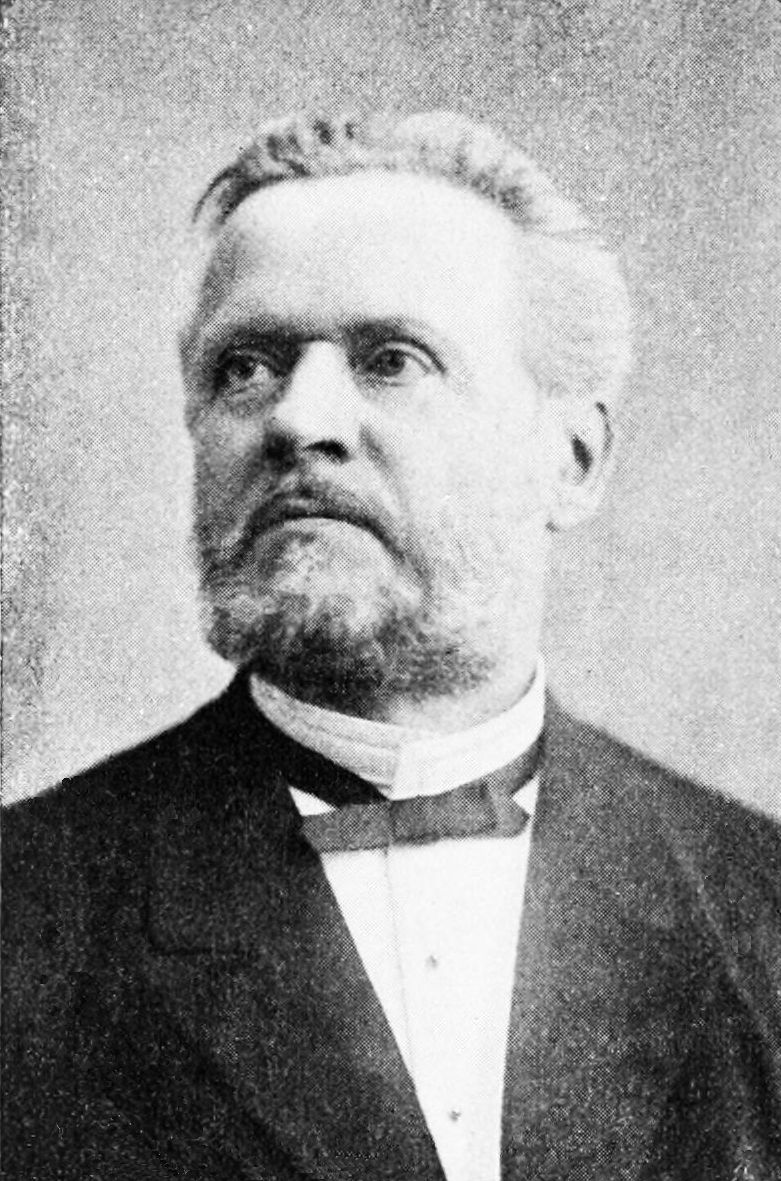
- Schwendener in 1896
- Born: 10 February 1829; Buchs, St. Gallen, Switzerland
- Died: 27 May 1919 (aged 90)
- Education: University of Zurich
- Occupation: Botanist
- Years active: 1860–1910

Simon Schwendener (10 February 1829 – 27 May 1919) was a Swiss botanist known for his investigations of plant anatomy and physiology. In 1867, he proposed that lichens are composite organisms formed by a symbiotic association between a fungus and an alga, a view that was initially controversial but later confirmed.

== Early life and education ==
Schwendener was born on 10 February 1829 in Buchs, St. Gallen.

In 1856, he received his doctorate at the University of Zurich, where afterwards he was an assistant to Carl Wilhelm von Nägeli (1817–1891).

== Career ==
In 1860, he became a professor of botany at the Ludwig-Maximilians-Universität München, and in 1867 a professor of botany and director of the Botanical Gardens in Basel. In 1877, he succeeded Wilhelm Hofmeister (1824–1877) as professor of botany at the University of Tübingen, and from 1878 until his retirement in 1910, Schwendener was a professor at the Friedrich Wilhelm University of Berlin.

Simon Schwendener is remembered for his investigations of plant anatomy and physiology, being interested in the interrelationship between a plant's construction and its functionality. He took a mechanistic approach to his botanical studies, believing that a plant's anatomical structure conformed to principles of mechanics. He conducted extensive research on the mechanics of sap ascent, the construction of a leaf's pulvinus, the positioning of a plant's leaves, and the inner-workings between stomata and its guard cells. He also used disk stacking to create a model for phyllotaxis in plants, and established the discipline of plant biomechanics.

In 1867, Schwendener announced to the scientific world his hypothesis that lichen was formed by two separate organisms, a fungus and an alga. At the time his theory was largely rejected, but it was afterwards proven to be factual. During his long career he had several renowned students and assistants, including Carl Correns, Gottlieb Haberlandt, Eduard Jahn, Richard Kolkwitz, Emil Heinricher, Max Westermaier, Georg Volkens and Otto Heinrich Warburg.

== Honors ==
He was elected on the 1st of May 1884 a Foreign Member of the Linnean Society of London. The plant genus Schwendenera K.Schum. in the family Rubiaceae is named in his honor.

== Selected writings ==
- Das mechanische Princip im anatomischen Bau der Monocotylen (1874) – The mechanistic principle on the anatomical structure of monocots.
- Mechanische Theorie der Blattstellungen (1878) – The mechanistic theory of leaf positioning.
- Über Bau und Mechanik der Spaltöffnungen (1881) – On the structure and mechanics of the stomata.
- Gesammelte Botanische Mittheilungen (1898) – Collected botanical treatises.
