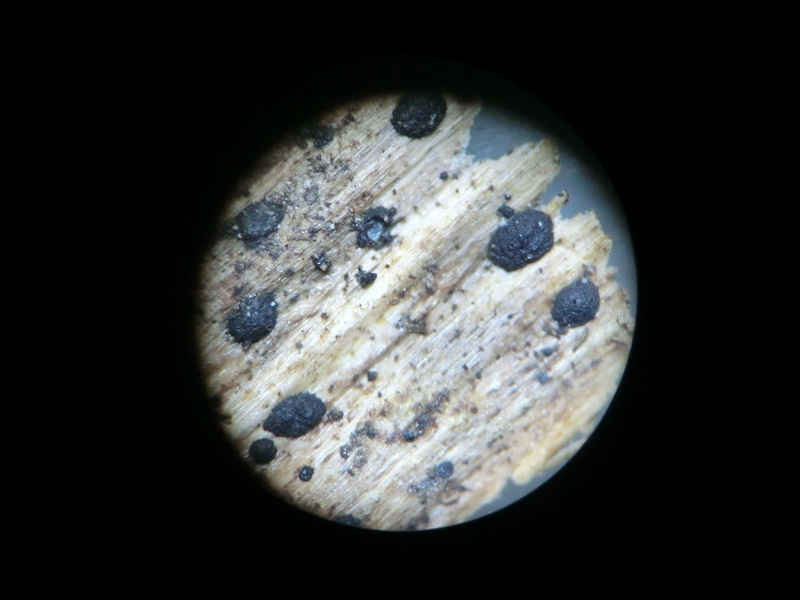
- Kirschsteiniothelia aethiops on dead wood of Fagus sylvatica

Scientific classification
- Kingdom: Fungi
- Division: Ascomycota
- Class: Dothideomycetes
- Subclass: incertae sedis
- Genus: Kirschsteiniothelia; D.Hawksw. (1985)

Type species
- Kirschsteiniothelia aethiops (Berk. & M.A.Curtis) D.Hawksw. (1985)

= Kirschsteiniothelia =

Genus of fungi

Kirschsteiniothelia is a genus of fungi in the class Dothideomycetes. The relationship of this taxon to other taxa within the class is unknown (incertae sedis).

The genus name of Kirschsteiniothelia is in honour of Wilhelm Kirschstein (1863 - 1946), who was a German schoolteacher and mycologist.

The genus was circumscribed by David Leslie Hawksworth in Bot. J. Linn. Soc. vol.91 on page 182 in 1985.

== Species ==
- Kirschsteiniothelia abietina
- Kirschsteiniothelia acerina
- Kirschsteiniothelia aethiops
- Kirschsteiniothelia atkinsonii
- Kirschsteiniothelia dolioloides
- Kirschsteiniothelia elaterascus
- Kirschsteiniothelia maritima
- Kirschsteiniothelia phileura
- Kirschsteiniothelia populi
- Kirschsteiniothelia proteae
- Kirschsteiniothelia recessa
- Kirschsteiniothelia reticulata
- Kirschsteiniothelia smilacis
- Kirschsteiniothelia striatispora
- Kirschsteiniothelia thujina
- Kirschsteiniothelia umbrinoidea
- Kirschsteiniothelia xera

== See also ==
- List of Dothideomycetes genera incertae sedis
