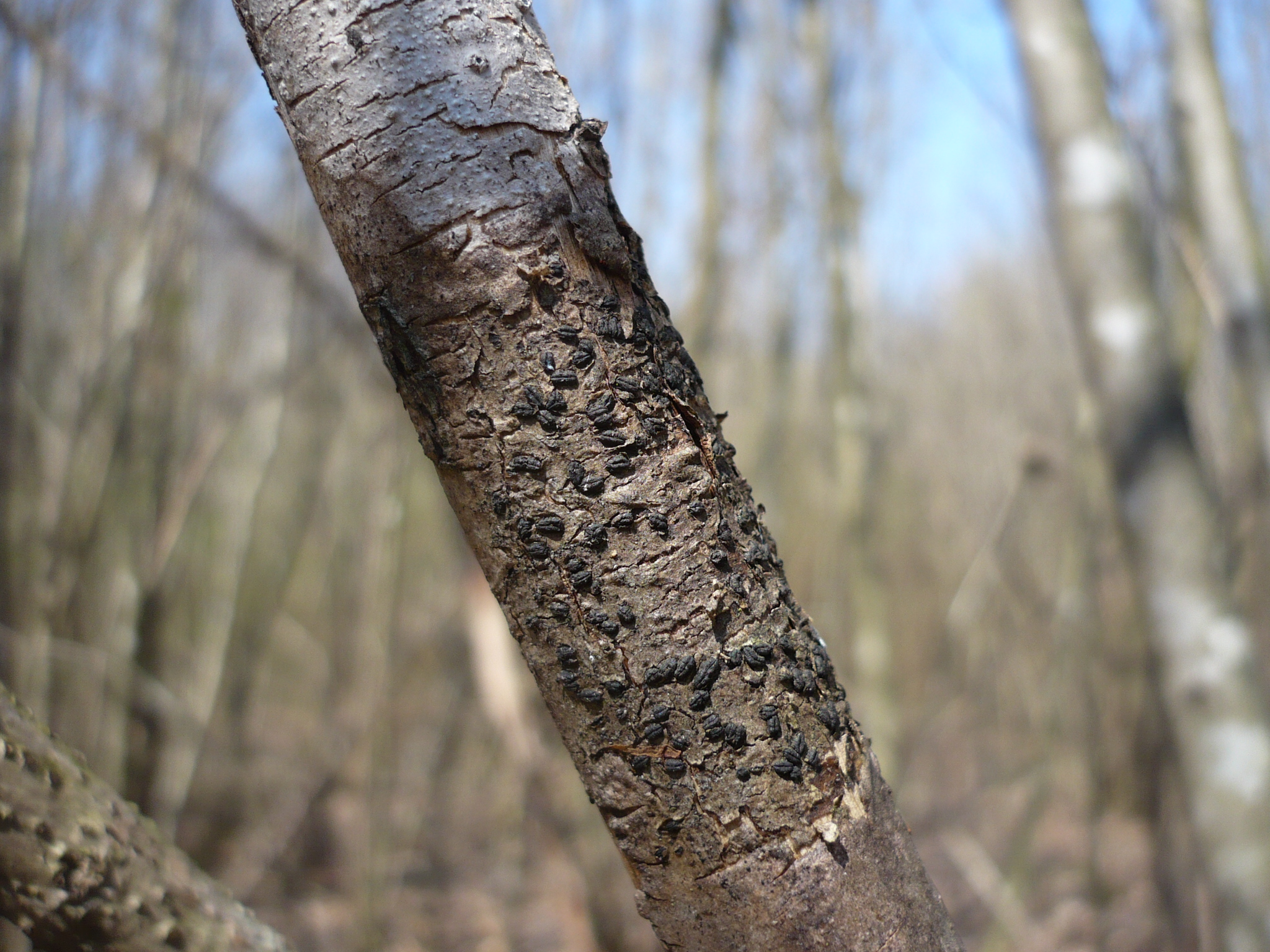
- Hysterographium fraxini

Scientific classification
- Kingdom: Fungi
- Division: Ascomycota
- Class: Dothideomycetes
- Order: Hysteriales
- Family: Hysteriaceae
- Genus: Hysterographium; Corda (1842)

Type species
- Hysterographium elongatum (Wahlenb.) Corda (1842)

Synonyms
- Hysteriopsis Speg. (1906); Polhysterium Speg. (1912); Fragosoa Cif. (1926)

= Hysterographium =

Genus of fungi

Hysterographium is a genus of fungi in the class Dothideomycetes. It was circumscribed by Czech mycologist August Carl Joseph Corda in 1842.

== Species ==
- Hysterographium acaciae
- Hysterographium andicola
- Hysterographium arctostaphyli
- Hysterographium awaradii
- Hysterographium baccarinii
- Hysterographium cocos
- Hysterographium cumingii
- Hysterographium cuyanum
- Hysterographium dalbergiae
- Hysterographium depressum
- Hysterographium elasticae
- Hysterographium flexuosum
- Hysterographium fraxini
- Hysterographium fuegianum
- Hysterographium grammodes
- Hysterographium ilicicola
- Hysterographium indicum
- Hysterographium kansense
- Hysterographium longisporum
- Hysterographium minus
- Hysterographium minutum
- Hysterographium multiseptatum
- Hysterographium multiseptum
- Hysterographium oleae
- Hysterographium palamalaiense
- Hysterographium pithecellobii
- Hysterographium pleosporoides
- Hysterographium praeandinum
- Hysterographium quercinum
- Hysterographium spinicola
- Hysterographium vanderystii
- Hysterographium varians
- Hysterographium vulvatum
