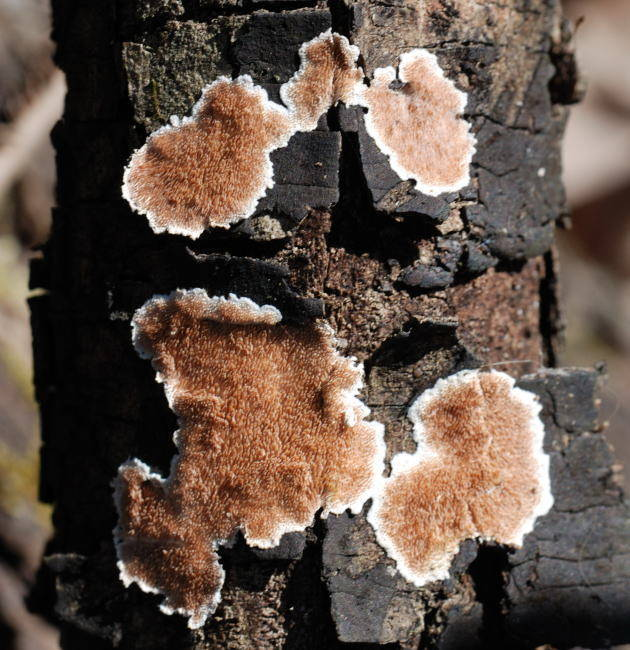
- Steccherinum ochraceum

Scientific classification
- Kingdom: Fungi
- Division: Basidiomycota
- Class: Agaricomycetes
- Order: Polyporales
- Family: Steccherinaceae
- Genus: Steccherinum; Gray (1821)

Type species
- Steccherinum ochraceum (Pers.) Gray (1821)

Synonyms
- Etheirodon Banker (1902); Leptodon Quél. (1886); Mycoleptodon Pat. (1897); Odontia Fr. (1835); Odontina Pat. (1874)

= Steccherinum =

Genus of fungi

Steccherinum is a widely distributed genus of toothed crust fungi in the family Steccherinaceae.

== Taxonomy ==
Steccherinum was circumscribed by Samuel Frederick Gray in his 1821 work A Natural Arrangement of British Plants.

== Description ==
Steccherinum fungi have a range of fruit body morphologies, including resupinate (crust-like), effused-reflexed (crust-like with the edges extending outwards to form caps), or pileate with either a stipe or only a stipe-like base.

== Species ==
A 2008 estimate placed 33 species in Steccherinum. As of June 2017, Index Fungorum accepts 50 species:

- S. agaricoides (Sw.) Banker (1906)
- S. aggregatum Hjortstam & Spooner (1990) – Sabah
- S. alaskense Lindsey & Gilb. (1980)
- S. albidum Legon & P.Roberts (2002) – Great Britain
- S. albofibrillosum (Hjortstam & Ryvarden) Hallenb. & Hjortstam (1988) – Costa Ric; Nepal; India
- S. basibadium Banker (1912)
- S. bourdotii Saliba & A.David (1988) – Europe; India
- S. ciliolatum (Berk. & M.A.Curtis) Gilb. & Budington (1970) – Portugal; India
- S. confragosum Maas Geest. & Lanq. (1975) – Brunei
- S. crassiusculum K.A.Harrison (1964)
- S. cremeoalbum Hjortstam (1984) – Sweden; Denmark; India
- S. cremicolor H.S.Yuan & Sheng H.Wu (2012) – Taiwan
- S. diversum Hjortstam & Melo (1999) – Roraima
- S. elongatum H.S.Yuan & Sheng H.Wu (2012) – Taiwan
- S. ethiopicum Maas Geest. (1974)
- S. fimbriatum (Pers.) J.Erikss. (1958) – Europe; India

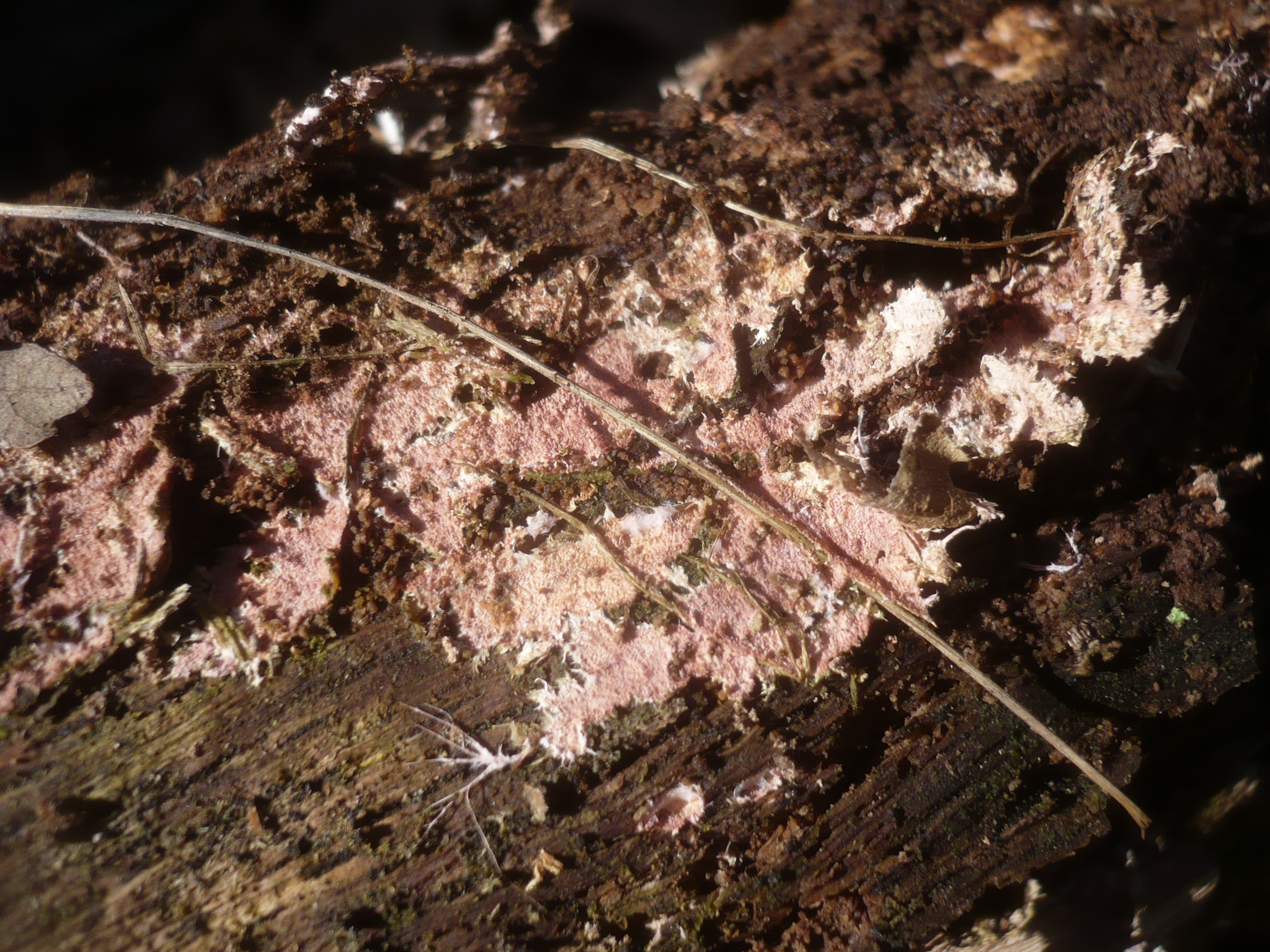
Steccherinum fimbriatum on Quercus cerris

- S. galeritum Maas Geest. (1974)
- S. gilvum Maas Geest. (1974)
- S. gracile (Pilát) Parmasto (1968)
- S. helvolum (Zipp. ex Lév.) S.Ito (1955)
- S. hydneum Rick ex Maas Geest. (1974)
- S. labeosum Maas Geest. & Lanq. (1975) – Kenya
- S. lacerum (P.Karst.) Kotir. & Saaren. (2009)
- S. laeticolor (Berk. & M.A.Curtis) Banker (1912) – Latvia; South Carolina; India
- S. lanestre Maas Geest. (1974)
- S. lusitanicum (Bres.) Ryvarden (1981)
- S. meridiochraceum Saliba & A.David (1988)
- S. meridionale (Rajchenb.) Westphalen, Tomšovský & Rajchenb. (2018)
- S. minutissimum Snell & E.A.Dick (1958)
- Steccherinum neonitidum Westphalen & Tomšovský (2018)
- S. ochraceum (Pers.) Gray (1821) – India
- S. oreophilum Lindsey & Gilb. (1977) – United States; Europe; India
- S. peckii Banker (1912)
- S. perparvulum Hjortstam & Ryvarden (2008)
- S. peruvianum Maas Geest. (1978)
- S. plumarium (Berk. & M.A.Curtis) Banker (1906)
- S. polycystidiferum (Rick) Westphalen, Tomšovský & Rajchenb. (2018)
- S. pseudochraceum Saliba & A.David (1988)
- S. rawakense (Pers.) Banker (1912) – China
- S. reniforme (Berk. & M.A.Curtis) Banker (1906) – South America
- S. resupinatum G.Cunn. (1958) – New Zealand
- S. robustius (J.Erikss. & S.Lundell) J.Erikss. (1958) – Europe; India
- S. russum Maas Geest. & Lanq. (1975) – Africa
- S. scalare Maas Geest. & Lanq. (1975) – Africa
- S. scruposum Maas Geest. & Lanq. (1975) – Africa
- S. straminellum (Bres.) Melo (1995)
- S. subcrinale (Peck) Ryvarden (1978) – India
- S. subglobosum H.S.Yuan & Y.C.Dai (2005) – China
- S. subulatum H.S.Yuan & Y.C.Dai (2005) – China
- S. tenue Burds. & Nakasone (1981)
- S. tenuispinum Spirin, Zmitr. & Malysheva (2007)
- S. undigerum (Berk & M.A.Curtis) Westphalen & Tomšovský (2018)
- S. willisii Maas Geest. (1974)
- S. zeylanicum Maas Geest. (1974)
