= Max Westermaier =

German botanist (1852–1903)

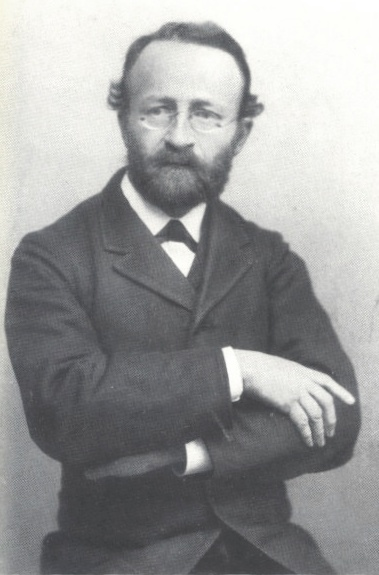
Max Westermaier (1852-1903)

Maximilian (Max) Westermaier (6 May 1852, Kaufbeuren – 1 May 1903, Fribourg) was a German botanist.

He studied sciences at the Ludwig-Maximilians-Universität München, where he was influenced by botanists Ludwig Radlkofer and Carl Wilhelm von Nägeli. After graduation, he worked as an assistant to Simon Schwendener at the Friedrich Wilhelm University of Berlin, becoming privat-docent in 1879. In 1887, he relocated to Königsberg as a temporary replacement for the late Robert Caspary (1818–1887). Beginning in 1890, he taught classes at the gymnasium in Freising, Bavaria.

In 1896, with the support of Pope Leo XIII, he became the first professor of botany at the University of Fribourg, a position he maintained until his death in 1903. In 1898–99, he participated in a scientific expedition to Java, publishing Zur Entwickelung und Struktur einiger Pteridophyten aus Java ("Development and structure of some pteridophytes of Java", 1900) as a result of his research.

In 1893, he published Kompendium der allgemeinen Botanik für Hochschulen, a book that was later translated into English and published in 1896 as A compendium of general botany. Other noted works by Westermaier are Zur Embryologie der Phanerogamen, insbesondere über die sogenannten Antipoden ("The embryology of phanerogams, particularly in the so-called Antipodes", 1890). and Ueber gelenkartige einrichtungen an stammorganen (1901).
