= Steccherinum tenue =

Scientific classification
- Domain: Eukaryota
- Kingdom: Fungi
- Division: Basidiomycota
- Class: Agaricomycetes
- Order: Polyporales
- Family: Steccherinaceae
- Genus: Steccherinum
- Species: S. tenue

Binomial name
- Steccherinum tenue Burds. & Nakasone (1981)

Synonyms
- Irpex tenuis (Burds. & Nakasone) Saaren. & Kotir. (2002)

Species of fungus

Steccherinum tenue is a hydnoid crust fungus of the family Steccherinaceae. It is found in the southern United States, where it grows on decaying angiospermous wood. The fungus was described as a new species in 1981 by mycologists Harold Burdsall and Karen Nakasone. The type, found growing on grape plants (Vitis), was collected in Great Smoky Mountains National Park (Tennessee) along the Rainbow Falls Trail. Steccherinum tenue has also been found on maple (Acer). The fungus is characterized by its thin grayish-yellow fruit bodies with grey to bluish-grey margins, a lack of rhizomorphs, and a scarcely developed subiculum. The specific epithet tenue (Latin for "thin") refers to the thin fruit bodies.
