= Listerella paradoxa =

Scientific classification
- Domain: Eukaryota
- Phylum: Amoebozoa
- Infraphylum: Mycetozoa
- Class: Myxogastria
- Order: Liceida
- Family: Listerelliidae
- Genus: Listerella
- Species: L. paradoxa

Binomial name
- Listerella paradoxa E.Jahn

Species of slime mould

Listerella paradoxa is a slime mould species from the class Myxogastria and the only member of its genus as well as the family Listerelliidae. The species is so far only found on the lichen genus Cladonia, mostly in European temperate zones.

== Characteristics ==
The sporangia are just 0.1 to 0.3 mm large, visible to the unaided eye as mere black-brown dots. The dehiscence lines are slightly lighter and clearly visible. They are unstiped, more or less hemispheric and flattened on the edge. The single layered peridium is tearing in four to six lobes during spore maturity and is purple-brown. It features dark lime tubercles only on the dehiscence lines.

A capillitium is less developed and is composed of pale purple-brown, slim, vermiculated strands, which are overgrown on the peridia. On low magnification, the 1 to 1.5 μm thick strands look like string of pearls. On high magnification, there are from the centre of the strand on cup or pear-shaped links visible, which thickenings are slightly darker on the blunted end, but the stipes are sallow. The link becomes gradually developed near the edge. The strand is first twice as thick as the normal dark-coloured one, then constrictions appear on them. Then, the constrictions become apparent on them, which arrange it into light stipes and knots, become little by little slimmer and take the shape of a cup. Alternatively, the strand is lighter coloured from the beginning on and the knots rapidly develop from the collar-like constrictions.

The spores are black-brown as spore mass and in transmitted light brownish yellow. They are on one side thin-walled, blur finely acanthoid and have a diameter from 7 to 8 μm.

== Habitat ==
Listerella paradoxa has been only found living on the thallae of the Cladonia species of lichen (Cladonia rangiferina, Cladonia impexa, Cladonia arbuscula, Cladonia gracilis, Cladonia tenuis), in temperate zones mainly in Europe (Germany, Sweden, Denmark, Great Britain) but also partially in Russia and Canada. A collection from California is classified as uncertain.

== Classification ==
The species and genus were first described in 1906 by Eduard Adolf Wilhelm Jahn on the basis of a discovery in Geesthacht. Its exact taxonomic position was unclear from the beginning and is still uncertain. Jahn grouped it into a family because of its strands in the capillitium. In the first half of the 19th century however it was often grouped into the Dianemaceae, and at later times often into the Liceaceae because of the relationship.

The genus name of Listerella is in honour of Arthur Hugh Lister (1830–1908), who was an English wine merchant and botanist, known for his research on Mycetozoa.
