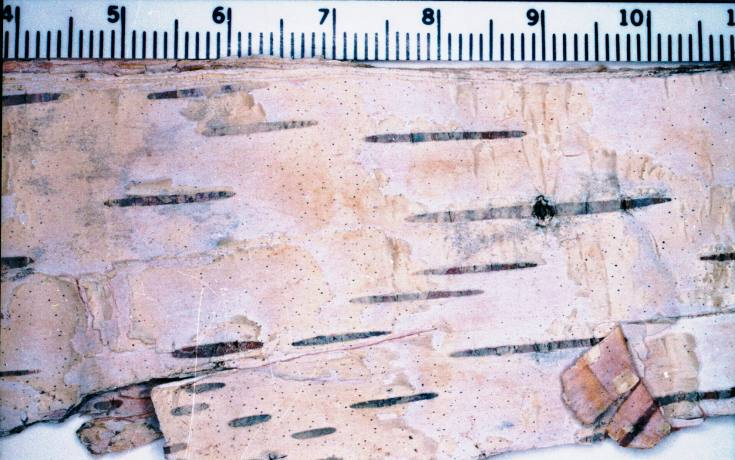
- Leptorhaphis epidermidis growing on paper birch

Scientific classification
- Domain: Eukaryota
- Kingdom: Fungi
- Division: Ascomycota
- Class: Dothideomycetes
- Subclass: Pleosporomycetidae

Orders
- Jahnulales; Hysteriales; Mytilinidiales; Pleosporales

= Pleosporomycetidae =

Subclass of fungi

Pleosporomycetidae is a subclass of Dothideomycetes consisting of four orders: Pleosporales, Hysteriales, Mytilinidiales, and Jahnulales. One of its defining features is the presence of pseudoparaphyses. These are sterile cells extending down from the upper portion of the cavity inside sexual structures containing the sac-like asci with sexually produced spores (ascospores). Pseudoparaphyses are initially attached at both their ends, but sometimes the upper part may become free. Some orders and families where these cells are present remain outside the subclass since DNA-based phylogenies cannot place them with confidence. However, they could conceivably be included within Pleosporomycetidae in future.
