= Steccherinum subglobosum =

Scientific classification
- Domain: Eukaryota
- Kingdom: Fungi
- Division: Basidiomycota
- Class: Agaricomycetes
- Order: Polyporales
- Family: Steccherinaceae
- Genus: Steccherinum
- Species: S. subglobosum

Binomial name
- Steccherinum subglobosum H.S.Yuan & Y.C.Dai (2005)

Species of fungus

Steccherinum subglobosum is a hydnoid fungus of the family Steccherinaceae. Found in China, it was described as new to science by mycologists Hai-Sheng Yuan and Yu-Cheng Dai in 2005. The type collection was found growing on a fallen angiosperm branch in Shennongjia Nature Reserve (Hubei province). The specific epithet subglobobum refers to the somewhat rounded shape of its spores.
