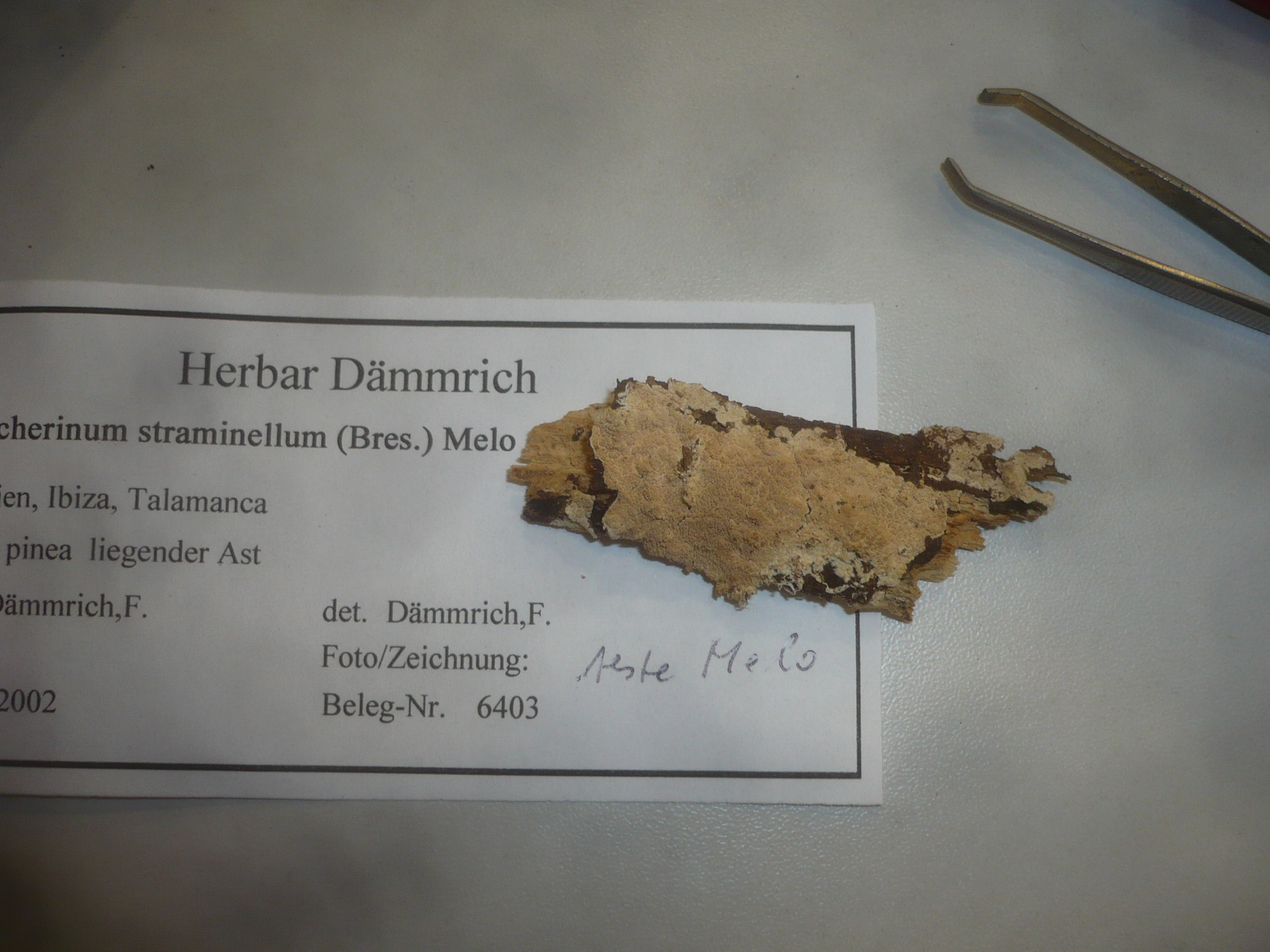

Scientific classification
- Domain: Eukaryota
- Kingdom: Fungi
- Division: Basidiomycota
- Class: Agaricomycetes
- Order: Polyporales
- Family: Steccherinaceae
- Genus: Steccherinum
- Species: S. straminellum

Binomial name
- Steccherinum straminellum (Bres.) Melo (1995)

Synonyms
- Odontia straminella Bres. (1902); Grandinia straminella (Bres.) Bourdot & Galzin (1928)

= Steccherinum straminellum =

Species of fungus

Steccherinum straminellum is a toothed crust fungus of the family Steccherinaceae. It was first described by Giacomo Bresadola in 1902 as Odontia straminella. The type collection was made in Portugal by Camille Torrend. After examining the type specimen, Ireneia Melo transferred the species to the genus Steccherinum in 1995.
