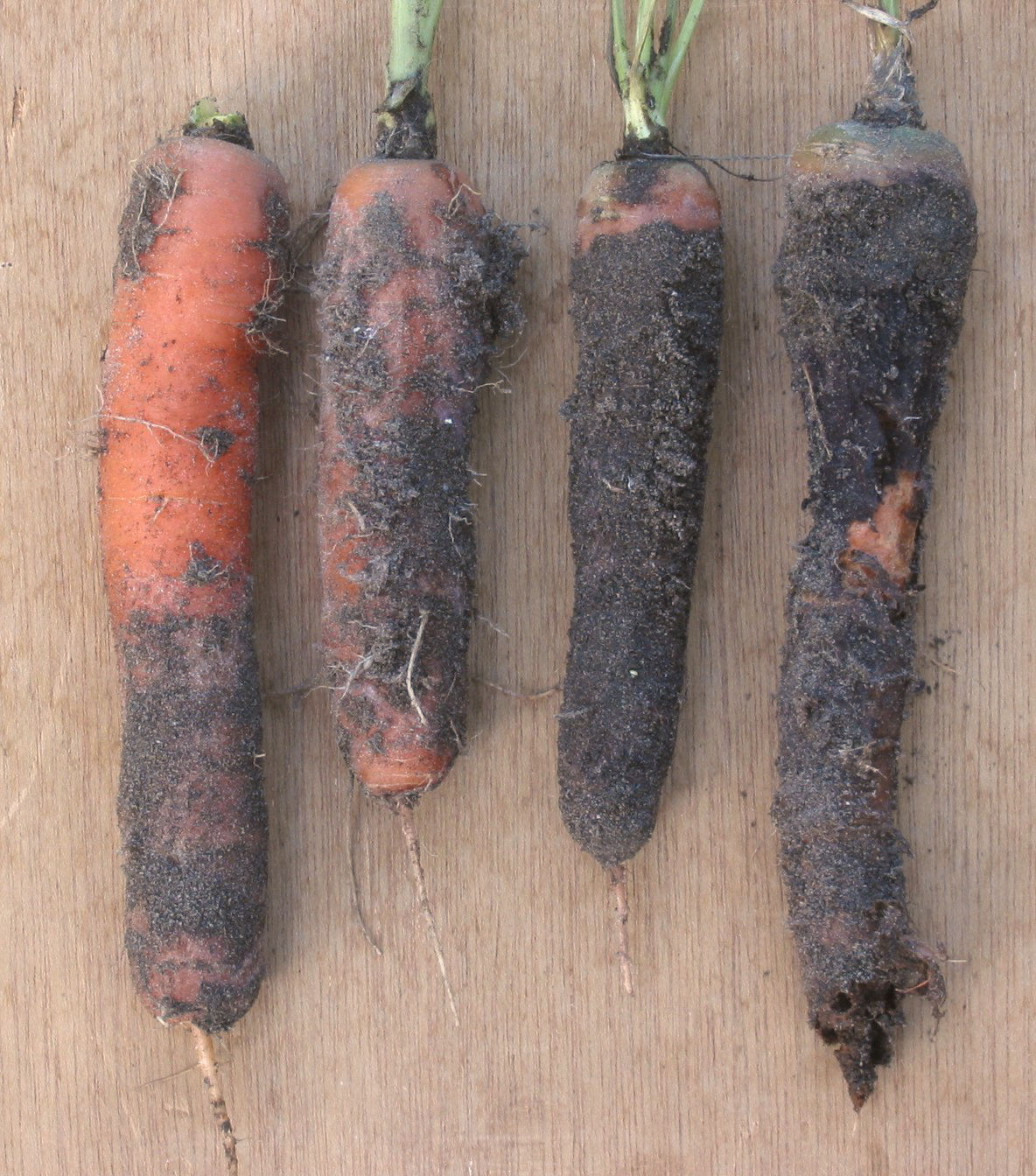
- Helicobasidium purpureum causing violet root rot on carrots

Scientific classification
- Kingdom: Fungi
- Division: Basidiomycota
- Class: Pucciniomycetes
- Order: Helicobasidiales
- Family: Helicobasidiaceae
- Genus: Helicobasidium; Pat. 1885

Type species
- Helicobasidium purpureum (Tul.) Pat. (1885)

Species
- Helicobasidium longisporum Helicobasidium mompa Helicobasidium purpureum

Synonyms
- Helicobasis Clem. & Shear (1931) Stypinella J. Schröt. (1887) Thanatophytum Nees (1816) Tuberculina Tode ex Sacc. (1880) Uredinula Speg. (1880)

= Helicobasidium =

Genus of fungi

Helicobasidium is a genus of fungi in the subdivision Pucciniomycotina. Basidiocarps (fruit bodies) are corticioid (patch-forming) and are typically violet to purple. Microscopically they have auricularioid (laterally septate) basidia. Asexual anamorphs, formerly referred to the genus Thanatophytum, produce sclerotia. Conidia-bearing anamorphs are parasitic on rust fungi and are currently still referred to the genus Tuberculina.

Species are opportunistic plant pathogens, causing violet root rot of root crops and other plants of economic importance. The name "violet root rot" refers to the dark purple colour of the mycelial mats formed on the infected plants, usually at or below the soil line. It can cause total rot and structural failure of roots and subterranean storage organs. Impact of violet root rot on crop loss is often due to stunting of above ground plant growth and decreased vigour, and in extreme cases, whole plant death. It does not directly infect above ground organs. Violet root rot can also damage or cause the death of subterranean storage organs such as potato tubers or carrots.

== Taxonomy ==
=== History ===
The genus was first described in 1885 by French mycologist Narcisse Théophile Patouillard to accommodate a purple, encrusting, terrestrial fungus with helicoid (spiralled), auricularioid (laterally septate) basidia which he considered distinct. Subsequent authors added additional species with similarly helicoid basidia, though not all had similarly coloured fruit bodies.

Rhizoctonia was introduced in 1815 by French mycologist Augustin Pyramus de Candolle for plant pathogenic fungi that produce hyphae and sclerotia. The type species, Rhizoctonia crocorum, was purple and encrusting and later shown to be an anamorphic form of Helicobasidium in a series of observations and inoculation trials conducted in part by Kew mycologist Elsie Wakefield. Rhizoctonia had, however, become an artificial form genus containing a mix of unrelated species. As part of a move towards a more natural classification, the type species was transferred to Rhizoctonia solani (to preserve the most commonly used name) and R. crocorum transferred to its earliest synonym Thanatophytum crocorum.

Tuberculina was introduced in 1880 by Italian mycologist Pier Andrea Saccardo for conidia-bearing fungi parasitizing rust fungi.

=== Current status ===
Molecular research, based on cladistic analysis of DNA sequences, has shown that all of three states - basidial, sclerotial, and conidial - are forms of the same genus of fungi. Following changes to the International Code of Nomenclature for algae, fungi, and plants, the practice of giving different names to teleomorph and anamorph forms of the same fungus was discontinued, meaning that Thanatophytum and Tuberculina became synonyms of the more commonly used name Helicobasidium.

Helicobasidium sensu stricto appears to be confined to a group of purple plant and rust pathogens whose taxonomy is currently unclear. Initial DNA sequencing has revealed at least seven species within the genus, but assigning names to them "demands a revision of the species concept within the group" which is yet to be undertaken. As a result, species of Tuberculina are not yet integrated within the genus Helicobasidium.

A few additional species described in Helicobasidium sensu lato, including Helicobasidium corticioides, are not closely related to the type species and are of uncertain disposition within the Pucciniomycotina.

== Violet root rot: hosts and symptoms ==
The most indicative sign of violet root rot is the presence of dark fungal mats on the affected plant’s roots and stem near the soil line, and the presence of mycelium on the soil. Helicobasidium species are opportunistic parasites of subterranean plant organs. Symptoms of infection include foliage chlorosis, premature abscission, wilting, and severe reduction of root mass. Infected soil may be identified by the conspicuous nature of the webbed mycelium, which transitions from white to dark violet over the growing season.

Violet root rot can infect a wide range of commercial crops, including apple (Malus domestica), mulberry (Morus spp), grape (Vitus spp), potato (Solanum tuberosum), plum (Prunus spp), tea, beets, soy, and cotton. It can also infect many more host plants and is not selective.

== Violet root rot: disease cycle ==
Helicobasidium species are soil borne pathogens. The pathogen overwinters both as sclerotia and via mycelium; basidiospores are not known to play a significant role in the disease cycle. Autumn sclerotia production is initiated by nutrient deficits; in the early growing season when the host and moisture are present again the sclerotia will resume growth and infection of the host. Sclerotia are dispersed through movement in irrigation or rain water, particularly of note where flood irrigation is used. Helicobasidium species will grow as an independent, whitish mycelium for the first part of the growing season, gradually darkening from pink to a dark violet brown as infection progresses mid-season.

Infection occurs via an external infection cushion from which penetrating hyphae infest the lamellae of root tissues, where they cause damage. The dark pigment found in Helicobasidium species is helicobasidin and can be toxic to some plants and microorganisms.

== Violet root rot: management ==
This disease is mostly controlled through cultural means. Resistant varieties can be an effective method to stifle disease progress, as well as early maturing annual crops which avoid infection altogether. Harvesting before the fungus has a chance to infect the crop is also a viable option. As cereal grains are not affected, long rotations with grains can reduce incidence. The fungus requires ample moisture, warm soil temperatures (20-30 °C) and low pH to thrive, drip irrigation and regular lime applications can serve to reduce the fungal presence.

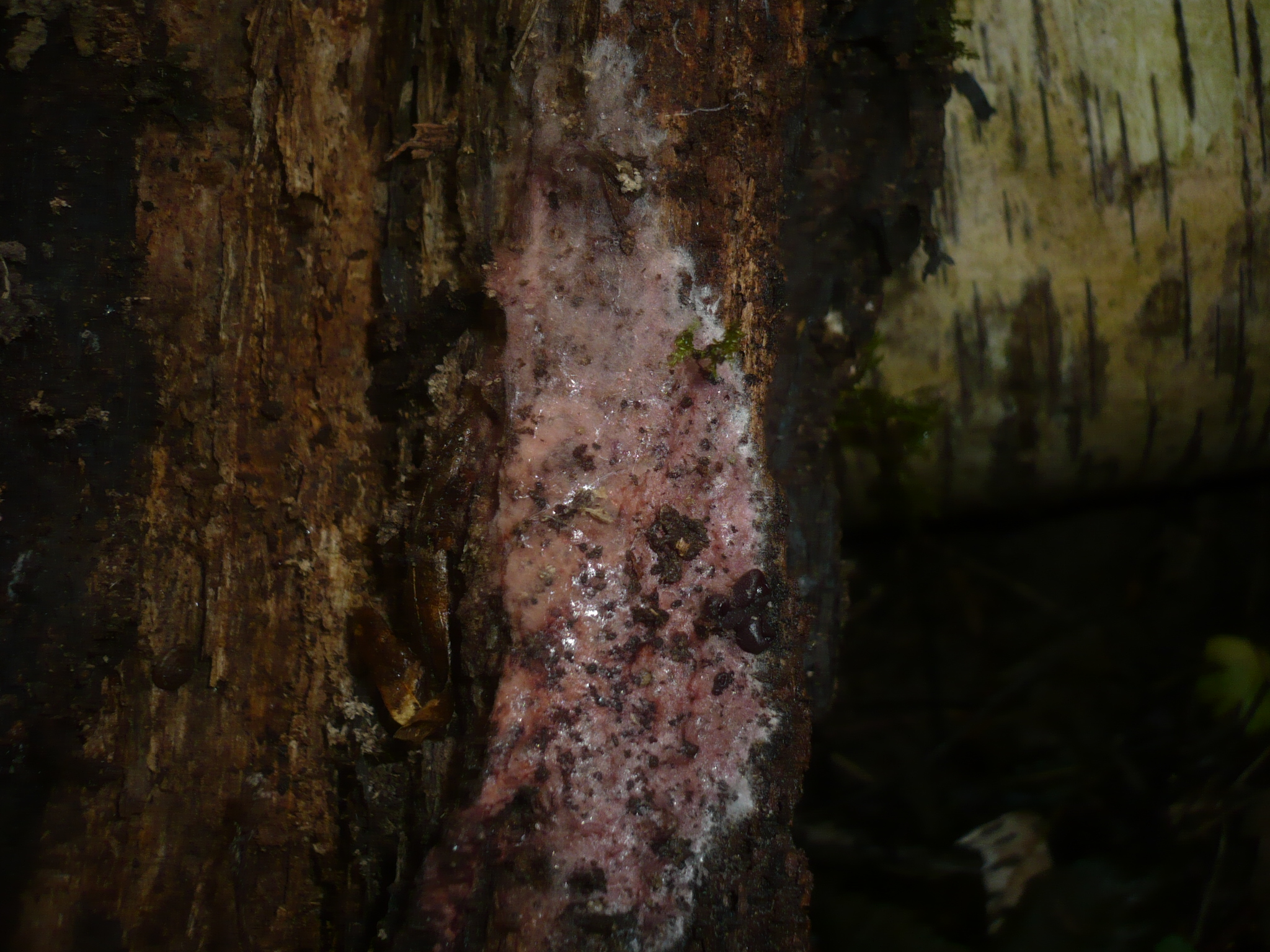
Helicobasidium purpureum
