= Richard Kolkwitz =

Richard Kolkwitz (March 23, 1873 – April 16, 1956) was a German botanist who was a native of Berlin.

He studied natural sciences at the University of Berlin under Adolf Engler (1844–1930) and Simon Schwendener (1829–1919), and from 1895 to 1900 was an assistant at the university under Leopold Kny (1841–1916). Afterwards, he became a professor of botany in Berlin, and from 1901 until 1938 was also in charge of the Biological Prussian Experimental and Testing Institute for water supply and sewage disposal. In 1954 he became a professor of botany at the Free University of Berlin.

== Saprobic Studies ==
Kolkwitz is known for work with Maximilian Marsson (1845–1909) in the development of the "saprobic system" as a biological determination of water quality and levels of organic waste (pollution) in rivers and streams. Their methodology was a non-chemical analysis that was based on patterns of abundance and distribution of various biological species. They examined the biological patterns of approximately 800 species of water plants and invertebrates in their studies, and produced a saprobic index of four zones defining levels of water quality. The term "polysaprobic" was used for river environments with a large amount of decaying organic matter; "oligosaprobic" described locations with the least amount of organic waste, while alpha- and beta-"mesosaprobic" defined moderately polluted habitats. Later, this index was expanded into nine zones, with "xenosaprobic" being the least polluted and poly-saprobic" having the highest level of waste.

== Eponyms ==
The genus Kolkwitzia is named after Kolkwitz. It contains one species, Kolkwitzia amabilis, which is commonly known as a "beauty bush". Also a device known in Germany as a Kolkwitzkammer is named after him, which is an instrument used to determine the quantity of cells and cell aggregates of phytoplankton.
