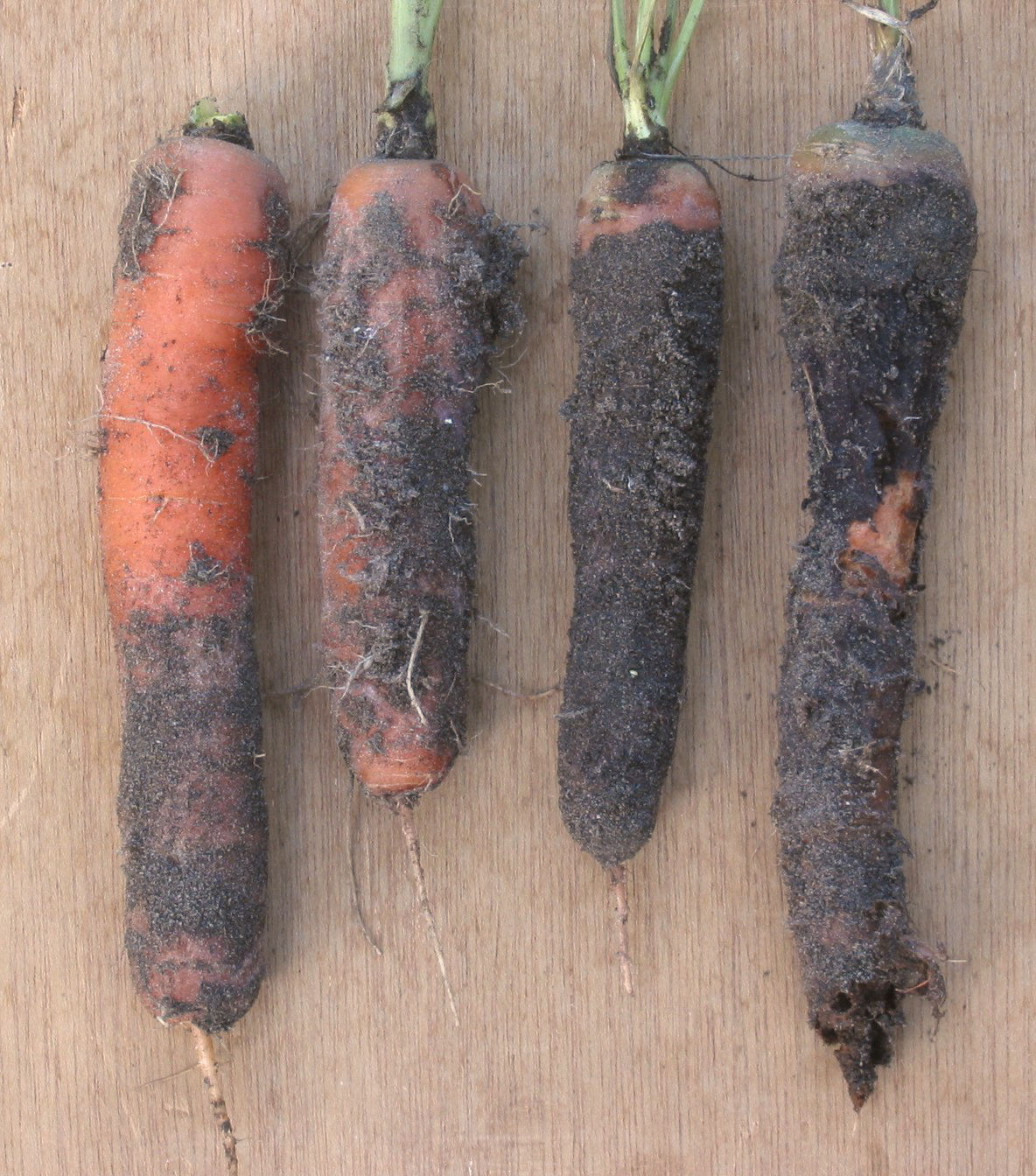
- Helicobasidium purpureum causing violet root rot on carrots

Scientific classification
- Domain: Eukaryota
- Kingdom: Fungi
- Division: Basidiomycota
- Class: Pucciniomycetes
- Order: Helicobasidiales
- Family: Helicobasidiaceae
- Genus: Helicobasidium
- Species: H. purpureum

Binomial name
- Helicobasidium purpureum Pat. (1885)

Synonyms
- Corticium sanguineum var. lilacinum Quél. (1888); Helicobasidium brebissonii (Desm.) Donk (1958); Hypochnus purpureus Tul. (1865); Protonema brebissonii Desm. (1834); Rhizoctonia asparagi Fuckel (1870); Rhizoctonia crocorum (Pers.) DC. (1815); Rhizoctonia medicaginis DC. (1815); Rhizoctonia rubiae M.J. Decne. (1837); Rhizoctonia violacea Tul. & C. Tul. (1851); Sclerotium crocorum Pers. (1801); Stypinella purpurea (Tul.) J. Schröt. (1887); Thanatophytum crocorum (Pers.) Nees (1816); Tuber parasiticum Bull. (1791)

= Helicobasidium purpureum =

Species of fungus

Helicobasidium purpureum is a species of fungus in the subdivision Pucciniomycotina. Basidiocarps (fruit bodies) are corticioid (patch-forming) and are typically violet to purple. Microscopically they have auricularioid (laterally septate) basidia. Helicobasidium purpureum is an opportunistic plant pathogen and is one of the causes of violet root rot of crops and other plants. DNA sequencing suggests that it is a complex of more than one species. The species has a conidia-bearing anamorph in the Tuberculina persicina complex that is a parasite of rust fungi.

== Taxonomy ==
Helicobasidium purpureum was first described from France in 1885 by French mycologist Narcisse Patouillard to accommodate a species with an effused, purple, corticioid fruit body and unusual curved or helicoid basidia. Patouillard described it as the only species in his new genus Helicobasidium. Patouillard was apparently unaware that Edmond Tulasne had described the same or a similar species under the name Hypochnus purpureus in 1865. Initial molecular research, based on cladistic analysis of DNA sequences, indicates that at least two species occur in the H. purpureum complex in Europe.

Persoon had described a sclerotia-forming anamorph in 1801 as Sclerotium crocorum, moved by de Candolle in 1815 to his new genus Rhizoctonia. Subsequent authors described a number of additional species in Rhizoctonia which are currently considered synonyms of R. crocorum (later called Thanatophytum crocorum). DNA evidence indicates that at least two species occur in the Thanatophytum crocorum complex in Europe, one of which is an anamorph of a species in the H. purpureum complex, the other a species in the Helicobasidium longisporum complex.

The rust parasite Tuberculina persicina is a further anamorph linked to Helicobasidium purpureum, but again represents a complex of at least four species, two of which are linked to H. longisporum.

== Description ==
Basidiocarps are corticioid smooth, membranaceous, purple to purple-brown. Microscopically the hyphae are easily visible, 5–8 μm diam., brownish-purple, and lack clamp connections. Basidia are tubular, curved or crook-shaped, and auricularioid (laterally septate). Basidiospores are oblong and often weakly curved, mostly 8–13 x 4.5–6 μm.

== Distribution ==
Helicobasidium purpureum has been recorded mainly from temperate areas of America, Asia, and Europe. It is reported to cause violet root rot of various crops.
