= Cochliobolus ravenelii =

Scientific classification
- Domain: Eukaryota
- Kingdom: Fungi
- Division: Ascomycota
- Class: Dothideomycetes
- Order: Pleosporales
- Family: Pleosporaceae
- Genus: Cochliobolus
- Species: C. ravenelii

Binomial name
- Cochliobolus ravenelii Alcorn, (1981)

Synonyms
- Bipolaris ravenelii (M.A. Curtis) Shoemaker, (1959); Drechslera ravenelii (M.A. Curtis) Subram. & B.L. Jain, (1966); Helminthosporium hoffmannii Berk. [as 'hoffmanni'], (1857); Helminthosporium ravenelii M.A. Curtis ex Berk., (1868); Helminthosporium tonkinense P. Karst. & Roum., (1890); Heterosporium callospermum Speg., (1857); Napicladium ravenelii (M.A. Curtis) Speg., (1888)

Species of fungus

Cochliobolus ravenelii is a fungal plant pathogen.
