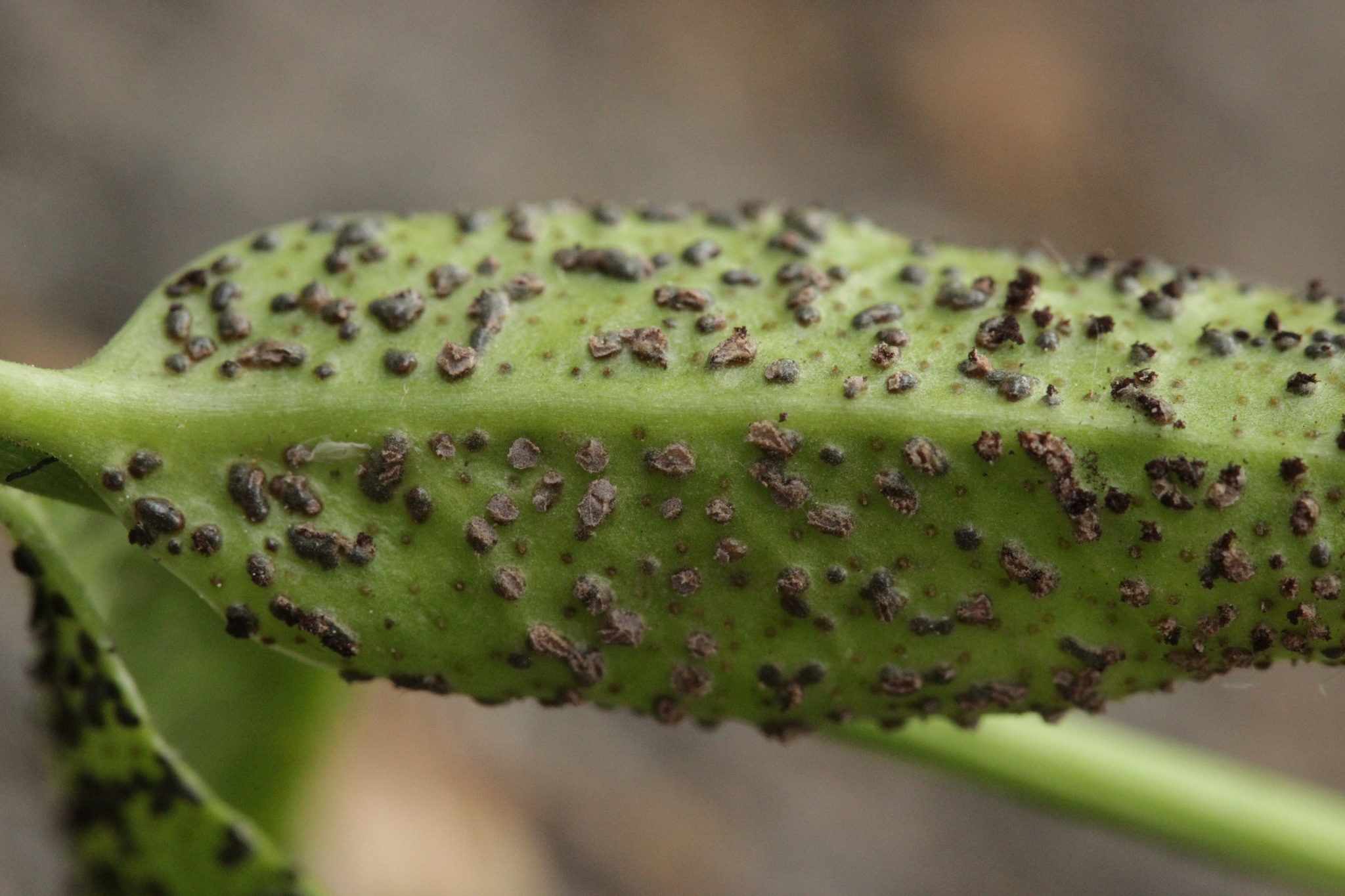
- Tuberculina sbrozzii parasitizing the rust Puccinia cribrata on leaf of Vinca minor

Scientific classification
- Domain: Eukaryota
- Kingdom: Fungi
- Division: Basidiomycota
- Class: Pucciniomycetes
- Order: Helicobasidiales
- Family: Helicobasidiaceae
- Genus: Tuberculina; Tode ex Sacc. (1880)

Type species
- Tuberculina persicina (Ditmar) Sacc. (1880)

Species
- See text

= Tuberculina =

Genus of fungi

Tuberculina is a genus of fungi in the order Helicobasidiales. The genus is a synonym of Helicobasidium, but currently species have not yet been assigned to the latter genus. Tuberculina species are conidia-bearing parasites of rust fungi, forming felt-like, purple patches on their hosts.

== Species ==
- Tuberculina africana
- Tuberculina akatii
- Tuberculina ampelophila
- Tuberculina andina
- Tuberculina apiculata
- Tuberculina arechavaletae
- Tuberculina argillacea
- Tuberculina costaricana
- Tuberculina davisiana
- Tuberculina dorsteniae
- Tuberculina flavogranulata
- Tuberculina fusicina
- Tuberculina guaranitica
- Tuberculina hyalospora
- Tuberculina jaffueli
- Tuberculina japonica
- Tuberculina jonesii
- Tuberculina malvacearum
- Tuberculina maxima
- Tuberculina ovalispora
- Tuberculina pallida
- Tuberculina pamparum
- Tuberculina paraguayensis
- Tuberculina pelargonii
- Tuberculina persicina
- Tuberculina phacidioides
- Tuberculina phyllachoricola
- Tuberculina pirottae
- Tuberculina portulacarum
- Tuberculina praeandina
- Tuberculina prosopidicola
- Tuberculina ricini
- Tuberculina rosae
- Tuberculina sbrozzii
- Tuberculina solanicola
- Tuberculina solanina
- Tuberculina talini
- Tuberculina tweediana
- Tuberculina umbrina
- Tuberculina vinosa
- Tuberculina viridis
