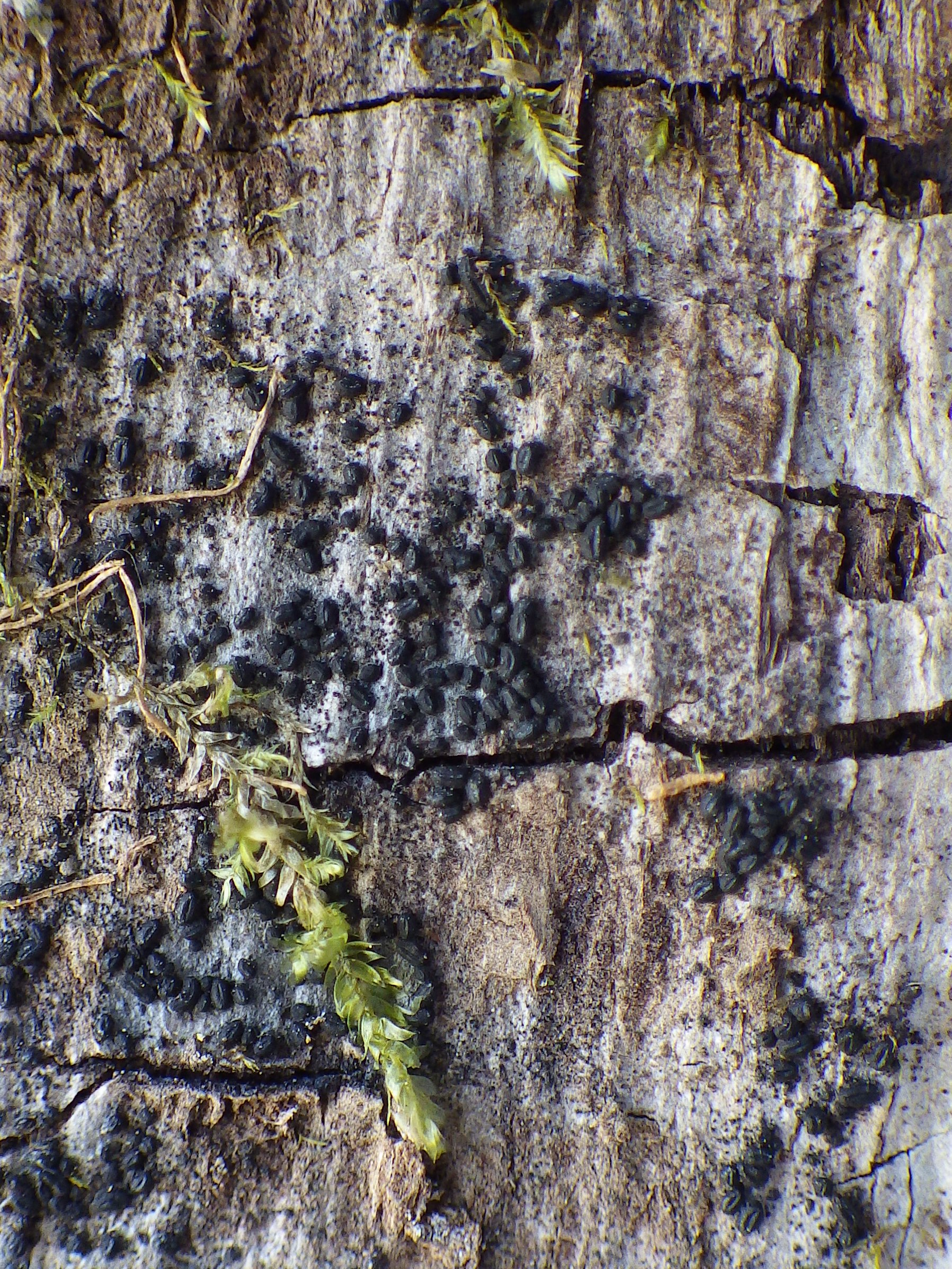
- Hysterium pulicare

Scientific classification
- Kingdom: Fungi
- Division: Ascomycota
- Class: Dothideomycetes
- Order: Hysteriales
- Family: Hysteriaceae; Chevall. (1826)

Genera
- Acrogenospora; Actidiographium; Cleistonium; Gloniella; Gloniopsis; Hypodermopsis; Hysterographium; Hysterium; Hysterobrevium; Hysterocarina; Hysteroglonium; Hysteropatella; Oedohysterium; Ostreichnion; Pseudoscypha

= Hysteriaceae =

Family of fungi

The Hysteriaceae are a taxonomic family of fungi and the only extant family of the order Hysteriales. Members of the Hysteriaceae are defined by the possession of a sexual structure called the hysterothecium, an elongated structure that opens by a longitudinal slit and releases sexually produced spores. The family is widely distributed, with many species found in temperate regions, and most are saprobic on wood and bark, although a few are parasitic on plants.

== Description ==
The defining feature of this group—the hysterothecium—is a dense, persistent darkly colored structure, with a boat-like shape and a pronounced lengthwise slit. Hysterothecia are capable of opening partially to reveal a lenticular (lens-shaped), disk-like hymenium or closing tightly in response to relative humidity. They can be embedded in the substratum, bursting through the surface of the substratum (erumpent), or rest entirely on the surface. They can be solitary or in groups, ellipsoid to greatly elongated, and are sometimes branched, triradiate or borne on a crust- or net-like growth of mycelium (a subiculum). In vertical section, hysterothecia are globose to inversely ovoid (obovoid), with a thick three-layered peridium, composed of small pseudoparenchymatous cells, the outer layer heavily encrusted with pigment and often longitudinally striated in age, the middle layer lighter in pigmentation and the inner layer distinctly thin-walled, pallid and compressed.

The hamathecium (hyphae or other tissues between asci) is composed of persistent cellular pseudoparaphyses (hyphae originating above the level of the asci and growing downwards between the developing asci), in a gel matrix, with tips often darkened or branched at maturity to form an epithecium (the external layer of tissue of the fruiting body of lichens and fungi, formed by the union of the tips of the paraphyses over the spore sacs). Bitunicate (double-walled) asci are borne in a basal layer and at maturity are typically club-shaped to cylindrical, bearing eight ascospores, overlapping in two series, ranging from hyaline to dark brown, obovoid, clavate, ellipsoid or fusoid. Ascospores are highly diverse in septation, and range from didymospores to phragmospores to dityospores, at times surrounded by a gel coating, and often show bipolar asymmetry. The Hysteriaceae are panglobal in distribution and are primarily lignicolous or corticolous (living on bark), although recently a saxicolous and apparently lichenized species has been described from Tasmania.

== Classification ==
Current classification of the Hysteriaceae includes the following genera: Hysterium Tode emend. Fr., Hysterographium Corda emend. de Not., Gloniopsis de Not., Gloniella Sacc., Glonium Muhlenb. ex. Fr., Farlowiella Sacc., and Hysterocarina Zogg, to which has been added Actidiographium Vassiljeva. The genera Hysteroglonium Rehm ex Lindau, Hysteropatella Rehm and Pseudoscypha Reid & Prioz. are tentatively included in the Hysteriaceae by Eriksson. Both coelomycetous pynidial states (e.g., Hysteropycnis) and dematiaceous hyphomycetous anamorphs (e.g., Coniosporium, Septonema, Sphaeronema and Sporidesmium) have been described for members of the Hysteriaceae.

=== Historical ===
The genus Hysterium, the type genus of the family Hysteriaceae, is attributed to Heinrich Julius Tode (1784), who was the first to apply the name to a group of fungi bearing a pronounced longitudinal slit, for which he gave the common name Venusschwämme. Recognizing the transitional nature of the ascoma, Tode later (1791) stated: “Medium hoc genus inter Pezizas and Lichenes”. Persoon (1801) synonymized the epithet pulicaris, first proposed by Lightfoot (1777) for a variety of Lichen scriptus β pulicaris, into what was to later become the type species of the genus, namely Hysterium pulicare Pers. ex Fr. Early authors provided remarkably accurate figures of hysteriaceous fungi. James Bolton (1789) and Robert Kaye Greville (1825) were the first to provide illustrations of asci and ascospores.

Due to the seemingly transitional nature of the hysterothecium, neither fully open nor closed, hysteriaceous fungi have been placed in the discomycetes and pyrenomycetes about equally by various mycologists throughout the 19th Century. In his Systema Mycologicum, Fries (1823) initially considered hysteriaceous fungi to belong to the pyrenomycetes and placed them in the order Phacidiacei, but later (1835) placed them in his new class discomycetes, stating: “Transitum sistunt ad Discomycetes, sed discum verum non monstrant.” François Fulgis Chevallier (1826) recognized the unique nature of the hysterothecium and was the first to segregate hysteriaceous fungi into a new order, the Hysterineae, which he considered as pyrenomycetes distinct from Fries’ Phacidiei. August Corda (1842), on the other hand, retained the Phacidiei within the Hysteriaceae, and divided the family into a number of subfamilies. Giuseppe De Notaris (1847) considered the Hysteriaceae to belong to the pyrenomycetes and used spore pigmentation to classify hysteriaceous fungi into the Phaeosporii and the Hyalosporii. Pier Andrea Saccardo (1873) initially followed Fries, but later (1874) placed hysteriaceous fungi in the pyrenomycetes, and carried de Notaris’ (1847) spore classification scheme further by dividing the Hysteriaceae into nine sections based on pigmentation and the morphology of spore septation. Job Bicknell Ellis and Benjamin Matlack Everhart (1892), in their North American Pyrenomycetes, tentatively included the Hysteriaceae, but stated that they had not at first intended to do so due to the transitional nature of the hysterothecium. In Rabenhorst’s Kryptogamen-Flora, Die Pilze, Heinrich Rehm (1896) compromised and placed the Hysteriales as an order intermediate between the pyrenomycetes and the discomycetes.

Duby (1862) considered hysteriaceous fungi to belong to the pyrenomycetes and proposed two sections, the Hystériées to include Hysterium, Glonium, and Actidium Fr. among others, and the Lophiées to accommodate Ostreichnion Duby, Mytilinidion Duby and Lophium Fr. Although Duby’s (1862) method of classification, based on dehiscent versus nondehiscent asci, was not followed by subsequent workers, he was the first to propose dividing hysteriaceous fungi into what was later to become two distinct families. However, one hundred years would pass before this distinction was fully recognized.

Although Franz von Höhnel (1918) considered the Hysteriaceae to be pyrenomycetes, he proposed a radical revision of the Hysteriales. Many of the fifty plus genera were removed, thereby leaving a greatly reduced core group to form the Hysteriaceae: Hysterium, Hysterographium, Farlowiella, Gloniella, Gloniopsis, Glonium (including the subgenus Psiloglonium von Höhnel for species of Glonium without subiculum), Bulliardella Sacc. (Paoli) [=Actidium], Mytilidion Sacc. [=Mytilinidion], Ostreion Sacc. [=Ostreichnion], Lophium and Dichaena Fr. The Hysteriaceae were seen as closely related to the Lophiostomataceae and the two were united into a new order, the “Hysterostomaeae” by von Höhnel.

=== Modern ===
Modern attempts at classification have placed the Hysteriaceae in the Pseudosphaeriales, the Dothiorales, the Dothideales and in a separate order the Hysteriales, closely related to the Pleosporales. The Hysteriales were placed in the subclass Loculoascomycetes by Luttrell (1955), corresponding to the Ascoloculares first proposed by Nannfeldt (1932). Unlike the hymenoascomycetes, the loculoascomycete ascoma originates prior to karyogamy in the dikaryon, with the correlated character state being the functionally two-walled ascus which ruptures in a fissitunicate (like a Jack-in-the-box) fashion.

Luttrell (1951) studied ascomal ontogeny and hamathicial development in Glonium stellatum Mühlenb.:Fr. and concluded that the Hysteriaceae possess the pseudoparaphysate Pleospora-type centrum (all the structures enclosed within the ascocarp), in which cellular, septate pseudoparaphyses grow downwards from the cavity roof, initially anchored at both ends, and occupy the locule prior to the formation of asci. Even though G. stellatum clearly possessed the Pleospora-type centrum, it differed in that the locule was an elongated hystereothecium, and the locule appeared to be formed largely by the dissolution of the sterile centrum parenchyma, as in the Dothidea-developmental type. Luttrell (1953) thus concluded that locule formation in G. stellatum, presumably representative of the Hysteriaceae as a whole, is intermediate between the Pleospora and Dothidea types. Initially, Luttrell (1953) was unsure whether the Hysteriaceae justified ordinal status, stating that the elongated hysteriaceous locule alone may not appear to be sufficient for the recognition of a separate order and the dothideaceous nature of the centrum at the earliest stages was not observed in his study. Nevertheless, Luttrell (1955) did finally retain the Hysteriales as a separate order and noted that this order may have phylogenetic relationships basal to the Pleosporales.

Hans Zogg (1962) acknowledged the heterogeneity of the classical Hysteriales and, following Duby (1862), divided hysteriaceous fungi into two families, namely the Hysteriaceae s. str. to include Hysterium, Hysterographium, Gloniopsis, Gloniella, Glonium, Farlowiella, and Hysterocarina, and the Lophiaceae Zogg ex von Arx and Müller [equivalent to Mytilinidiaceae Kirschst., as meant by Barr 1990], to include Actidium, Mytilidion [=Mytilinidion], Lophium and Glyphium Nitsch. ex Lehm. Recent molecular evidence, however, has removed the genus Glyphium to the Chaetothyriales in the Eurotiomycetes. Zogg (1962) characterized the Hysteriaceae as having ovoid to elongate thick-walled hysterothecia, with a prominent sunken slit, whereas the Mytilinidiaceae, as the Lophiaceae, were characterized by a thin-walled, fragile mussel-shaped (conchate) or hatchet-shaped (dolabrate) ascoma, standing on edge, with a prominent, crested apex. Zogg (1962) postulated that the two families were unrelated, with the Hysteriaceae connected to the Dothioraceae, and the Mytilinidiaceae showing relationships to the Lophiostomataceae.

Although Luttrell held a very wide concept of the Hysteriales (1973), he did not recognize the family Lophiaceae, instead proposing a subfamily within the Hysteriaceae to accommodate mytilinidiaceous forms. Barr (1979) also originally held a wide view of the Hysteriales, but, unlike Luttrell (1973), maintained the two family distinction. Later, Barr (1983) abandoned the Hysteriales and placed the Hysteriaceae within the Pleosporales due to the presence of cellular pseudoparaphyses, asci borne in a basal rather than peripheral layer and ascospores typically showing bipolar asymmetry. Barr noted (1987) that the relationship of some members of the Hysteriaceae was with the Cucurbitariaceae or with the Pleosporaceae. Finally, Kirk et al. (2001) maintained both the Hysteriaceae and the Mytilinidiaceae in the Hysteriales, but Eriksson (2006) removed the Mytilinidiaceae from the Hysteriales and considered it as Dothideomycetes et 'Chaetothyriomycetes incertae sedis, leaving the Hysteriaceae as the sole family in the Hysteriales.

The Hysteriaceae may show superficial resemblance with the Patellariaceae Corda (Patellariales Hawksw. & Erikss.). But as Barr (1987) points out, the hamathecium in the Patellariaceae is composed of apically free paraphysoids that form a pseudoepithecium, whereas in the Hysteriaceae the hamathecium is composed of downward-growing pseudoparaphyses that, at maturity, become apically dissociated and may become darkened to form an epithecium. Peridial differences, especially the texture and features related to the peridial base, further separate the two families (Barr 1987). The genus Hysteropatella Rehm is transitional with paraphysoids and a well-developed pseudoepithecium, but the peridium, thickened base of the ascoma and cylindric asci are all features of the Hysteriaceae. Kutorga and Hawksworth (1997) in their revision of the Patellariaceae did not include Hysteropatella. Initial studies using the nuclear small subunit (nuSSU) rDNA have found that Hysterium pulicare and Hysteropatella clavispora (Peck) Seaver formed a clade with high statistical support, distant from other Dothideomycetes, and thus supporting the inclusion of the genus Hysteropatella within the Hysteriaceae.

More recently, Schoch et al. (2006), using a multigene phylogeny of the Dothideomycetes, based on nu SSU, nu LSU, EF1a & RPB2, provided evidence indicating that hysteriaceous fungi occupy a basal position to a monophyletic Pleosporales, in agreement with Luttrell (1955). However, it was noted that the hysteriaceous fungi sampled did not form a monophyletic group. Farlowiella carmichaeliana (Berk.) Sacc. was basal to the Pleosporales, but very distant from the other members of the Hysteriales sampled, which were inclusive of Hysterium pulicare, Hysteropatella clavispora, and Hysteropatella elliptica Fr., that clustered together with high statistical support, as perhaps the nucleus of an emerging monophyletic Hysteriales. The nearest association of this Hysteriales core group was with members of the Tubeufiaceae M.E. Barr and the Botryosphaeriaceae Theiss. & P. Syd. The sole mytilinidiaceous member analyzed in this study, Lophium mytilinum (Pers.) Fr., also occupied a basal position to the Pleosporales, but was distant to the core group of Hysteriales and was designated as Pleosporomycetidae incertae sedis.

Taken together, classification emphasizing the transitional nature of the hysterothecium, studies in centrum ontogeny and recent molecular evidence, seems to indicate a basal phylogenetic position of the Hysteriales to the Pleosporales and emphasizes the need for further study of the group.

== Genera ==
- Acrogenospora M.B. Ellis (1971) has 7 species, all of which are anamorphs of genus Farlowiella. the type species is Acrogenospora sphaerocephala (Berk. & Broome) M.B. Ellis (1971).
- Gloniella Sacc. (1883) contain over 70 species, and the type is Gloniella sardoa Sacc. & Traverso (1883)
- Gloniopsis De Not. (1847) contains roughly 45 species. The type is Gloniopsis decipiens De Not. (1847).
- Hysterium Pers. (1797), with roughly 400 species described, is the largest genus of the Hysteriaceae. The type is Hysterium pulicare Ellis.
- Hysteropatella Rehm (1890) has 8 species, and the type is Hysteropatella prostii (Duby) Rehm (1890).
- Pseudoscypha J. Reid & Piroz (1966) has one species, the type P. abietis.

== Other sources ==
- Boehm EWA, Schoch CL, Spatafora JW (2009). On the evolution of the Hysteriaceae and Mytilinidiaceae (Pleosporomycetidae, Dothideomycetes, Ascomycota) using four nuclear genes. Mycol Res 113: 461–479.
- Boehm EWA, Mugambi GK, Miller AN, Huhndorf SM, Marincowitz S, Spatafora JW, Schoch CL. (2009). A molecular phylogenetic reappraisal of the Hysteriaceae, Mytilinidiaceae, and Gloniaceae (Pleosporomycetidae, Dothideomycetes) with keys to world species. Studies in Mycology 64: 49 – 83.
