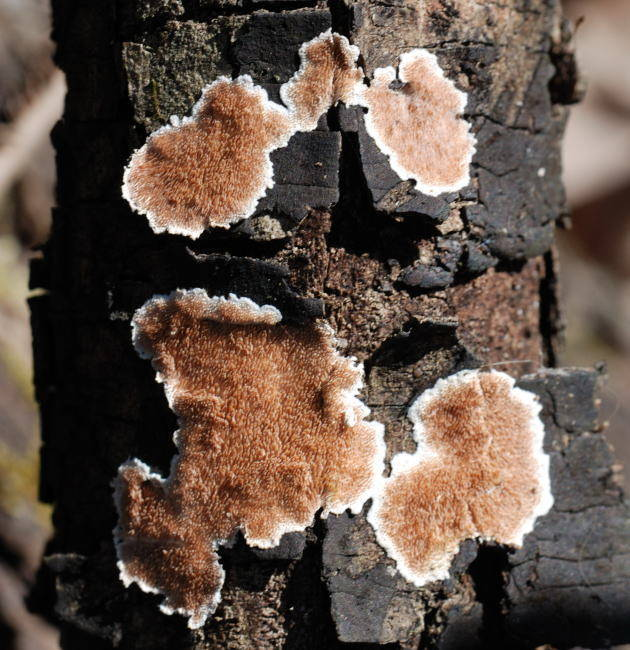

Scientific classification
- Kingdom: Fungi
- Division: Basidiomycota
- Class: Agaricomycetes
- Order: Polyporales
- Family: Steccherinaceae
- Genus: Steccherinum
- Species: S. ochraceum

Binomial name
- Steccherinum ochraceum (Pers.) Gray (1821)

Synonyms
- List: Acia denticulata; Acia uda subsp. denticulata; Climacodon ochraceus; Gloiodon pudorinus; Hydnum daviesii; Hydnum decurrens; Hydnum denticulatum; Hydnum dichroum; Hydnum ochraceum; Hydnum pudorinum; Hydnum rhois; Irpex ochraceus; Irpex rhois; Leptodon ochraceus; Mycoacia denticulata; Mycoleptodon decurrens; Mycoleptodon dichrous; Mycoleptodon ochraceus; Mycoleptodon pudorinus; Mycoleptodon rhois; Odontia denticulata; Odontina denticulata; Sarcodontia denticulata; Steccherinum rhois

= Steccherinum ochraceum =

Species of fungus

Steccherinum ochraceum, known as ochre spreading tooth, is a hydnoid fungus of the family Steccherinaceae. It was originally described as Hydnum ochraceum by Johann Friedrich Gmelin in 1792, and later transferred to the genus Steccherinum by Samuel Frederick Gray in 1821.

It is a plant pathogen infecting sweetgum trees. It can be found throughout North America and in Nepal.
