= Wilhelm Kirschstein =

German mycologist (1863–1946)

Wilhelm Kirschstein (2 October 1863 - 1946 in Groß Behnitz bei Nauen) was a German schoolteacher and mycologist.

During his career, he taught classes in Rathenow and Berlin-Pankow. As a taxonomist, he described the mycological families Niessliaceae and Mytilinidiaceae as well as naming numerous fungi genera and species.

The mycological genera Kirschsteinia Syd., 1906 Kirschsteiniella Petr., 1923 and Kirschsteiniothelia D.Hawksw. (1985) are all named in his honor.

== Selected bibliography ==
- Beiträge zur Kenntnis der Ascomyceten. Verhandlungen des Botanischen Vereins der Provinz Brandenburg 66: 23-29., 1924 – Contributions to the knowledge of the Ascomycetes.
- Neue und seltene Ascomyceten. Annales Mycologici 33: 202-229., 1935 – New and rare Ascomycetes.
- Beiträge zur Kenntnis der Ascomyceten und ihrer Nebenformen besonders aus der Mark Brandenburg und dem Bayerischen Walde. Annales Mycologici 34: 180-210., 1936 – Contributions to the knowledge of Ascomycetes and its variants, particularly from Mark Brandenburg and the Bavarian Forest.
- Pilze: Sphaerellaceae. Kryptogamenflora der Mark Brandenburg 7 (3): 305-448, 1938 – Fungi: Sphaerellaceae.
- Über neue, seltene und kritische Ascomyceten und Fungi Imperfecti. I. Annales Mycologici 36 (5-6): 367-400., 1938 – About new, rare and critical Ascomycetes and fungi imperfecti.
