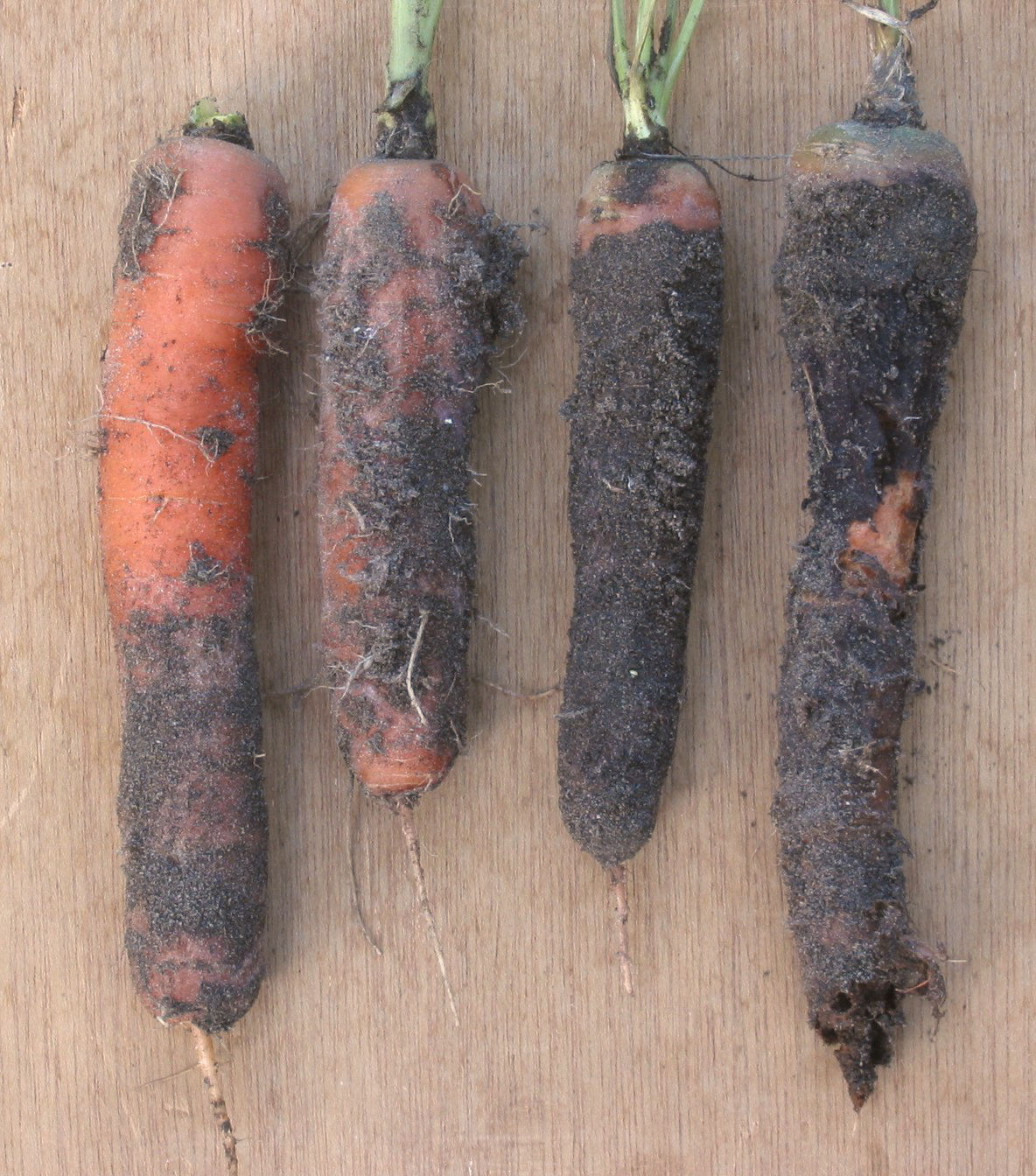
- Helicobasidium purpureum causing violet root rot on carrots

Scientific classification
- Kingdom: Fungi
- Division: Basidiomycota
- Class: Pucciniomycetes
- Order: Helicobasidiales; R.Bauer, Begerow, J.P.Samp., M.Weiss & Oberw. (2006)
- Family: Helicobasidiaceae; P.M.Kirk (2008)

Type genus
- Helicobasidium Pat. (1885)

Genera
- Helicobasidium; Tuberculina

= Helicobasidiales =

Order of fungi

The Helicobasidiales are an order of fungi in the subdivision Pucciniomycotina. The order is currently monotypic, containing the single family Helicobasidiaceae which itself is monotypic, containing the single genus Helicobasidium. The anamorphic genus Tuberculina is a synonym of Helicobasidium, but species are not currently integrated in the latter genus.
