= Elsie Maud Wakefield =

British mycologist

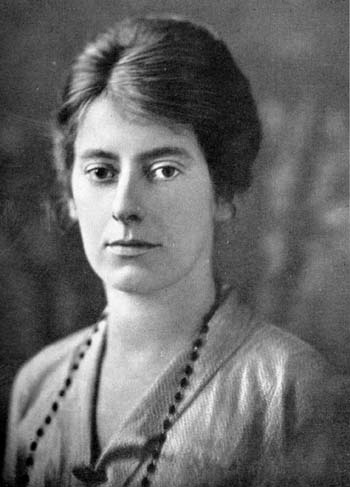
- Elsie Maud Wakefield c.1920
- Born: 3 July 1886; Birmingham
- Died: 17 June 1972 (aged 85)
- Known for: Contributions to taxonomic mycology and plant pathology
- Awards: Linnean Society, Fellow, 1911; Mycological Society, President, 1929; Mycological Society, Secretary 1918-1936; Mycological Society, Honorary Member, 1941; OBE, 1950
- Scientific career
- Fields: Mycology
- Author abbrev. (botany): Wakef.

Elsie Maud Wakefield, OBE (3 July 1886 – 17 June 1972) was an English mycologist and plant pathologist.

== Background and education ==
She was born in Birmingham, the daughter of a science teacher. She was educated at Swansea High School for Girls and then went to Somerville College, Oxford, where she received a first class honours degree in botany.

== Career in mycology ==
After completing her degree, Wakefield was awarded a Gilchrist scholarship and worked with Prof. Karl von Tubeuf in Munich, where she undertook cultural studies on the larger fungi, publishing her first paper there, in German. On her return in 1910, she became assistant to George Massee, head of mycology and cryptogams at the Royal Botanic Gardens, Kew. On his retirement in 1915, she took over his position as head of mycology.

In 1920, she took advantage of a travelling scholarship from Somerville College to spend six months working as a mycologist in the West Indies. Subsequently, she remained at Kew until her retirement in 1951, working on British and tropical fungi, with a particular interest in corticioid and tomentelloid species. She was a specialist in Basidiomycota and recognised internationally for knowledge of the Aphyllophorales. During this time, she also published several papers on plant pathology. R.W.G. Dennis joined her as an assistant in 1944, becoming head of mycology on her retirement.

Elsie Wakefield was elected President of the British Mycological Society in 1929. She was awarded an OBE in 1950.

During her career, she published almost 100 papers on fungi and plant pathology, together with two popular field guides to the larger British fungi. She described many new species, from Britain and overseas. The fungal genera Wakefieldia and Wakefieldiomyces are named after her, as are the species Aleurodiscus wakefieldiae, Amaurodon wakefieldiae, Brachysporium wakefieldiae, Crepidotus wakefieldiae, Hypochnicium wakefieldiae, Pneumocystis wakefieldiae, Poria wakefieldiae, Postia wakefieldiae and Thelephora wakefieldiae.

Wakefield is regarded as being "one of the most influential British mycologists of her generation."

== Selected publications ==
- Wakefield, E M. (1912) . Nigerian Fungi. Kew bulletin of miscellaneous information 1912: I4I -I44
- Cotton, A. D. & Wakefield, E.M. (1919). A revision of the British Clavariae. Transactions of the British Mycological Society 6: 164-198
- Wakefield, E.M. (1921). Mosaic diseases of plants. West Indian Bulletin 18: 197-206
- Buddin, W. & Wakefield, E.M. (1927). Studies on Rhizoctonia crocorum and Helicobasidium purpureum. Transactions of the British Mycological Society 12: 116-140
- Ministry of Agriculture and Fisheries. (1945) Bulletin 23: Edible and poisonous fungi. Sixth edition. HMSO
- Wakefield, E.M. & Dennis, R.W.G. (1950) Common British fungi. London: Gawthorn
- Wakefield, E.M. (1954). The observers' book of common fungi. London : Warne
- Wakefield, E.M. (1969). Tomentelloideae in the British Isles. Transactions of the British Mycological Society 53: 161-206.
