= Jahnulales =

Scientific classification
- Kingdom: Fungi
- Division: Ascomycota
- Class: Dothideomycetes
- Subclass: Pleosporomycetidae
- Order: Jahnulales; K.L. Pang, Abdel-Wahab, El-Shar., E.B.G.Jones & Sivichai (2002)

Families
- Aliquandostipitaceae; Manglicolaceae

Order of fungi

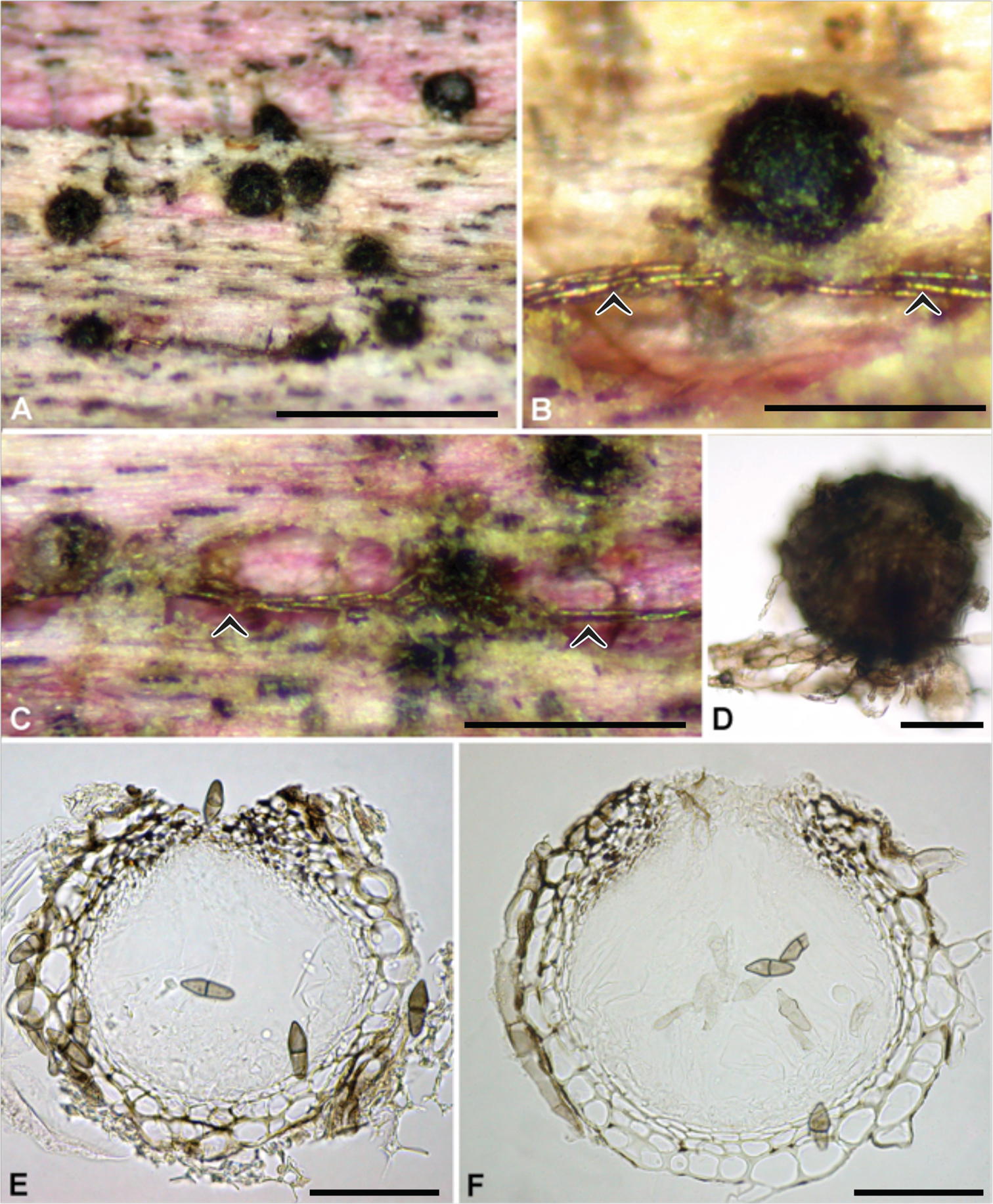
A–F Jahnula purpurea (from the HOLOTYPE; MJF 14016, ILLS 72402). A–C Ascomata on submerged wood. Note the purple stain. Arrowheads indicate the subtending superficial hyphae on wood, which connect multiple ascomata on wood. D Ascoma in water showing broad hyphae emerging from the base of the fruiting body. E, F Longitudinal section through ascoma. Note broad pseudoparenchymatic cells comprising the peridial wall.

The Jahnulales are an order of fungi in the class Dothideomycetes, subclass Pleosporomycetidae. They are ascomycetes that have stalked/stessile and dimorphic ascomata, hyphal stalk cells that are about 40 μm wide. It contains the families Aliquandostipitaceae and Manglicolaceae.
