= Hysteriales =

Scientific classification
- Kingdom: Fungi
- Division: Ascomycota
- Class: Dothideomycetes
- Subclass: Pleosporomycetidae
- Order: Hysteriales; Lindau (1896)

Families
- Hysteriaceae

Order of fungi

The Hysteriales are an order of fungi in the class Dothideomycetes, subclass Pleosporomycetidae. It consists of a single family, Hysteriaceae. Members of Hysteriales produce elongated, often boat shaped sexual structures with slit-like openings (hysterothecia). However species with these structures are very diverse. Comparisons based on DNA sequences indicate species with hysterothecia do not share a single ancestor and therefore species with hysterothecia can be found in several fungal orders. The newest definition of the order relies on DNA sequence differences and a combination of morphological characters.
