= Division (taxonomy) =

Taxonomic rank

In biological taxonomy, division is a rank that is used differently in zoology and in botany.

In botany and mycology, division is the traditional name for a rank now considered equivalent to phylum. The use of either term is allowed under the International Code of Botanical Nomenclature.

The main divisions of land plants are the Marchantiophyta (liverworts), Anthocerotophyta (hornworts), Bryophyta (mosses), Filicophyta (ferns), Sphenophyta (horsetails), Cycadophyta (cycads), Ginkgophyta (ginkgos), Pinophyta (conifers), Gnetophyta (gnetophytes), and the Magnoliophyta (Angiosperms, flowering plants). The Magnoliophyta now dominate terrestrial ecosystems, comprising 80% of vascular plant species.

In zoology, the term division is applied to an optional rank subordinate to the infraclass and superordinate to the legion and cohort. A widely used classification (e.g. Carroll 1988) recognises teleost fishes as a Division Teleostei within Class Actinopterygii (the ray-finned fishes). Less commonly (as in Milner 1988), living tetrapods are ranked as Divisions Amphibia and Amniota within the clade of vertebrates with fleshy limbs (Sarcopterygii).

== Proposals for standardisation ==
In 1978, a group of botanists including Harold Charles Bold, Arthur Cronquist and Lynn Margulis proposed replacing the term "division" with "phylum" in botanical nomenclature, arguing that maintaining different terms for the same taxonomic rank across biological kingdoms created unnecessary confusion. This was particularly problematic for unicellular eukaryotes, where heterotrophic organisms were classified under zoological nomenclature (using "phylum") while autotrophic organisms fell under botanical nomenclature (using "division"). They proposed updating the International Code of Botanical Nomenclature to use "phylum" and "subphylum" throughout, while maintaining that names originally published as divisions would be treated as if they had been published as phyla.

== Molecular phylogenetic classification ==
The use of molecular methods, particularly 16S ribosomal RNA analysis, helped establish major bacterial divisions in the 1980s. In 1985, Carl Woese and colleagues identified ten major groups of eubacteria through oligonucleotide signature analysis, noting that these groupings were "appropriately termed eubacterial Phyla or Divisions." This work provided early molecular evidence for the equivalence of bacterial divisions with phyla and helped establish a phylogenetic basis for high-level bacterial classification.

== Viruses and prokaryotes ==
In 2020, the International Committee on Taxonomy of Viruses (ICTV) formalised a 15-rank hierarchical classification system, ranging from the highest rank "realm" (rather than domain) down through the lower ranks, notably using "phylum" rather than "division". Under this system, the first viral realm established was Riboviria, encompassing all RNA viruses that encode an RNA-directed RNA polymerase.

In 2021, the International Code of Nomenclature of Prokaryotes (ICNP) formally included the rank of phylum for the first time, adopting the suffix "-ota" for phylum names. This led to the publication of names for 46 prokaryotic phyla with cultured representatives, replacing some established names with neologisms – for example, "Proteobacteria" became "Pseudomonadota" and "Firmicutes" became "Bacillota".
