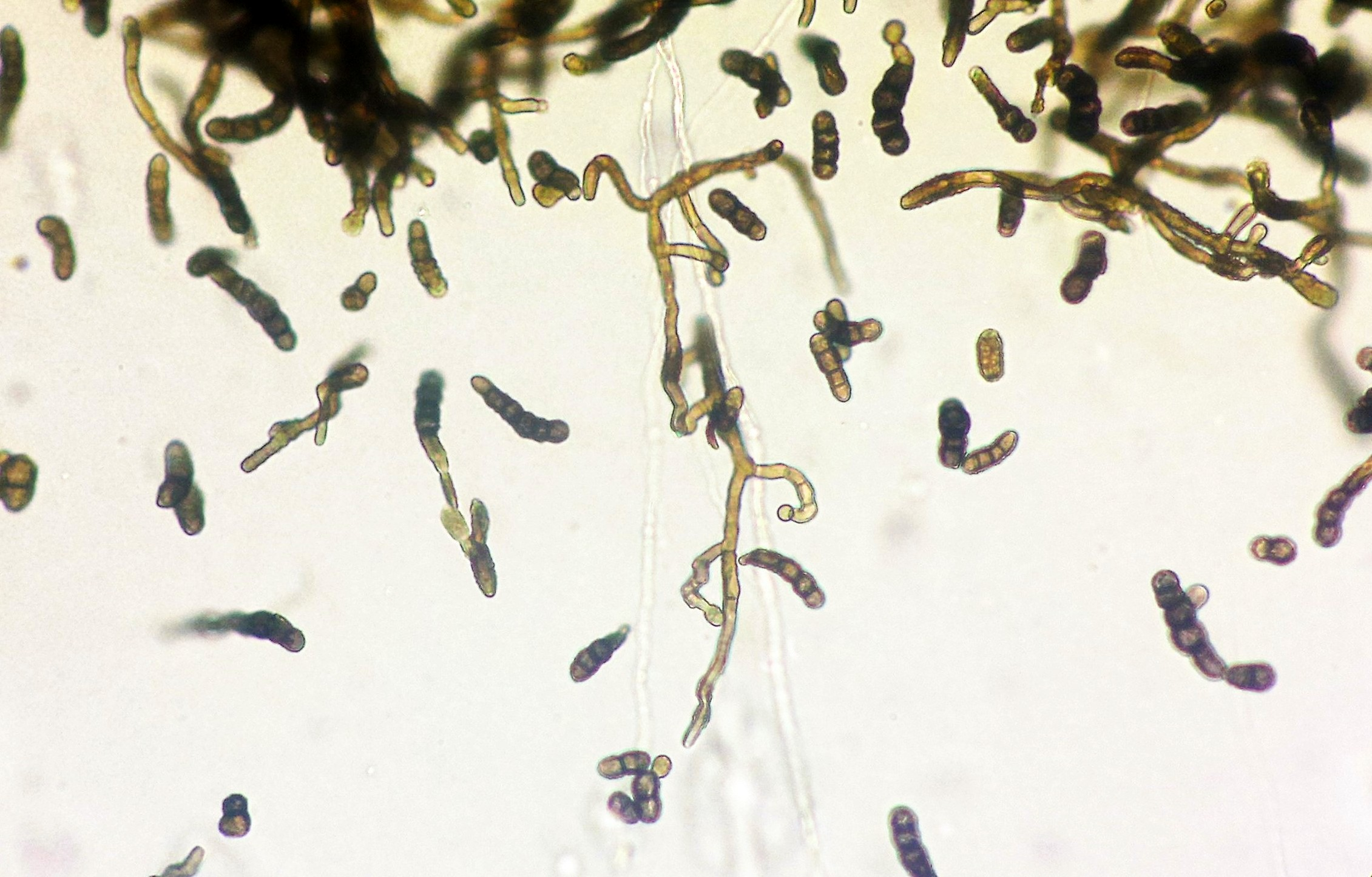
- Microscopic view of Taeniolella fungus, not identified to species

Scientific classification
- Kingdom: Fungi
- Division: Ascomycota
- Class: Dothideomycetes
- Order: Mytilinidiales
- Family: Mytilinidiaceae
- Genus: Taeniolella; S.Hughes (1958)

Type species
- Taeniolella exilis (P.Karst.) S.Hughes (1958)

= Taeniolella =

Genus of fungi

Taeniolella is a genus of asexual fungi hyphomycetes in the family Mytilinidiaceae. Some of the species are lichenicolous (lichen-dwelling), others are saprophytic, while others are endophytic. The genus was circumscribed in 1958 by Canadian mycologist Stanley John Hughes, with Taeniolella exilis as the type species. Major revisions of the lichenicolous species in the genus were published in 2016 and 2018.

== Taxonomy ==
The Canadian mycologist Stanley J. Hughes erected Taeniolella in 1958 for a small group of dematiaceous (dark-walled) hyphomycetes that produced pigmented, septate conidia in acropetal chains. In the Latin protologue he described an immersed, septate mycelium; short, brown, simple to sparingly branched conidiophores that may be aggregated into tiny pustules; and conidia that are oval to cylindrical, smooth or verrucose, two- to many-septate and often constricted at the septa. The conidia readily form simple or branched chains and can resemble erect hyphae after detachment. Hughes selected T. exilis (originally Torula exilis Karst.) as the type species.

Subsequent authors broadened the genus to encompass both wood-inhabiting saprobes and lichen-dwelling (lichenicolous) species, arguing that the differences between their conidial morphologies are gradual and do not warrant separate genera. By the time of the latest monographic treatment the name Taeniolella had been applied to 45 accepted species: 29 lichenicolous taxa and 16 saprobic taxa, together occupying substrates that range from decorticated wood to the thalli, apothecia and even galls of diverse lichens.

Molecular studies have shown that this broad concept is polyphyletic. The type species, T. exilis, sits in the family Kirschsteiniotheliaceae (class Dothideomycetes, order Kirschsteiniotheliales), whereas other wood-inhabiting species fall elsewhere in the Sordariomycetes (e.g., Savoryellaceae s.l. and Lindgomycetaceae). Lichenicolous species form a separate clade within the order Asterotexiales, but even that group is intermixed with members of genera such as Buelliella, Karschia and Stictographa. Because sequence data remain unavailable for many described species, Heuchert and colleagues chose to retain the traditional, inclusive circumscription of Taeniolella pending broader sampling and better-resolved phylogenies.

== Species ==
As of 2025, Species Fungorum (in the Catalogue of Life) accept 62 species of Taeniolella:

- Taeniolella alta (Ehrenb.) S.Hughes (1958)
- Taeniolella americana J.L.Crane & Schokn. (1982)
- Taeniolella andropogonis Yadav & Lal (1966)
- Taeniolella aquatilis (Woron.) Milko (1985)
- Taeniolella arctoparmeliae Heuchert & Zhurb. (2018)
- Taeniolella arthoniae (M.S.Christ. & D. Hawksw.) Heuchert & U.Braun (2018)
- Taeniolella atra Varghese & V.G.Rao (1980)
- Taeniolella atricerebrina Hafellner (2007)
- Taeniolella bhagavatiensis B.S.Reddy, Manohar. & V.G.Rao (1997)
- Taeniolella bilgramii S.S.Reddy & S.M. Reddy (1978)
- Taeniolella breviuscula (Berk. & M.A.Curtis) S.Hughes (1958)
- Taeniolella caespitosa M.S.Cole & D.Hawksw. (2001)
- Taeniolella caffra Matsush. (1996)
- Taeniolella christiansenii Alstrup & D. Hawksw. (1990)
- Taeniolella chrysotrichis Diederich (1990)
- Taeniolella cladinicola Alstrup (1993)
- Taeniolella curvata (Peck) S.Hughes (1958)
- Taeniolella delicata M.S. Christ. & D.Hawksw. (1979)
- Taeniolella dichotoma Borowska (1975)
- Taeniolella diederichiana Etayo & Calat. (2005)
- Taeniolella diploschistis Heuchert, U.Braun, Diederich & Zhurb. (2019)
- Taeniolella exilis (P.Karst.) S.Hughes (1958)
- Taeniolella faginea (Fuckel) S.Hughes (1958)
- Taeniolella filamentosa Heuchert (2018)
- Taeniolella friesii (Hepp) Hafellner (1998)
- Taeniolella hawksworthiana Heuchert, Ertz & Common (2016)
- Taeniolella hunanensis Y.L.Zhang & T.Y.Zhang (2007)
- Taeniolella ionaspidicola Alstrup & E.S.Hansen (2001)
- Taeniolella lecanoricola Heuchert & Diederich (2018)
- Taeniolella longissima R.A.Eaton & E.B.G.Jones (2002)
- Taeniolella multiplex (Berk. & M.A. Curtis) S.Hughes (1958)
- Taeniolella muricata (Ellis & Everh.) S.Hughes (1958)
- Taeniolella pertusariicola D.Hawksw. & H.Mayrhofer (1990)
- Taeniolella phaeophysciae D.Hawksw. (1979)
- Taeniolella phialosperma Ts.Watan. (1992)
- Taeniolella plantaginis (Corda) S.Hughes (1958)
- Taeniolella pseudocyphellariae Etayo (2008)
- Taeniolella pulvillus (Berk. & Broome) M.B.Ellis (1976)
- Taeniolella punctata M.S.Christ. & D.Hawksw. (1979)
- Taeniolella pyrenulae Heuchert & Diederich (2016)
- Taeniolella ravenelii Heuchert & U.Braun (2018)
- Taeniolella robusta Mercado (1984)
- Taeniolella rolfii Diederich & Zhurb. (1997)
- Taeniolella sabalicola G.Delgado & A.N.Mill. (2016)
- Taeniolella santessonii Etayo & Heuchert (2010)
- Taeniolella sapindi Sh.Kumar, Raghv. Singh, V.K.Pal, Upadhyaya & D.K.Agarwal (2007)
- Taeniolella serusiauxii Diederich (1992)
- Taeniolella stilbospora (Corda) S.Hughes (1958)
- Taeniolella stilbosporoides Heuchert & U.Braun (2018)
- Taeniolella strictae Alstrup (2004)
- Taeniolella subsessilis (Ellis & Everh.) S.Hughes (1958)
- Taeniolella thelotrematis Heuchert & Brackel (2018)
- Taeniolella toruloides Heuchert & Diederich (2016)
- Taeniolella trapeliopseos Diederich (1990)
- Taeniolella typhoides Gulis & Marvanová (1999)
- Taeniolella umbilicariae Heuchert & Etayo (2018)
- Taeniolella umbilicariicola Heuchert & Etayo (2018)
- Taeniolella vermicularis (Corda) S.Hughes (1958)
- Taeniolella verrucosa M.S.Christ. & D.Hawksw. (1979)
- Taeniolella weberi Heuchert & Sparrius (2018)
