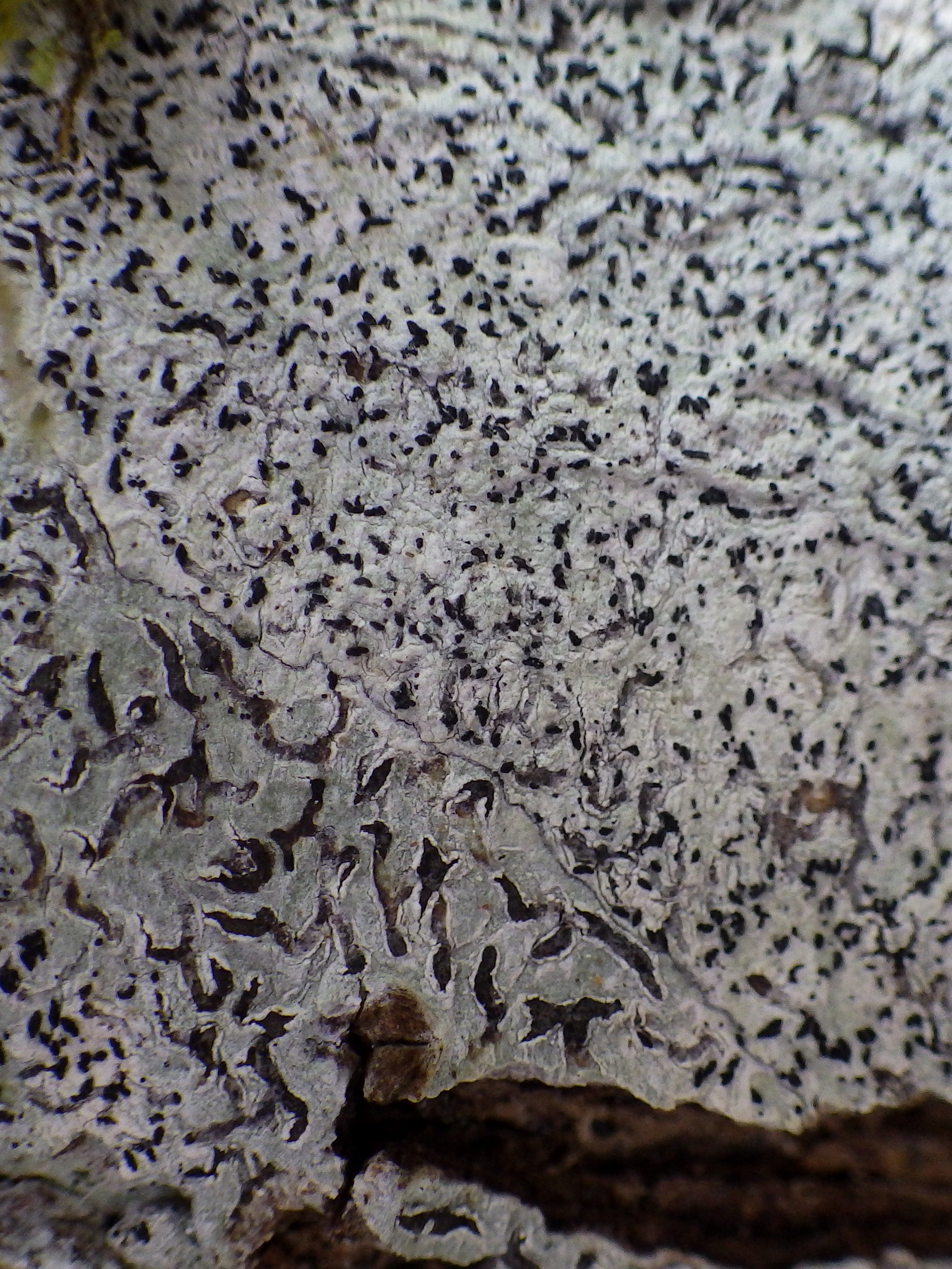
- Melaspilea lentiginosa

Scientific classification
- Kingdom: Fungi
- Division: Ascomycota
- Class: Dothideomycetes
- Order: Eremithallales
- Family: Melaspileaceae; W.Watson (1929)

Type genus
- Melaspilea Nyl. (1857)

Genera
- Encephalographa; Melaspilea

Synonyms
- Eremithallaceae Lücking & Lumbsch (2008)

= Melaspileaceae =

Family of fungi

Melaspileaceae is a family of lichenised and saprobic fungi in the class Dothideomycetes, order Eremithallales. A 2015 phylogenetic study narrowed the family to two genera, Melaspilea and Encephalographa, and showed that Eremithallales, which had been proposed in 2008, belongs within the Dothideomycetes, and treated Eremithallaceae as a synonym of Melaspileaceae. Many names historically kept in Melaspileaceae but having lichenicolous or saprobic life histories are part of the order Asterinales and belong in segregate genera such as Melaspileella, Melaspileopsis, Stictographa, Karschia, Buelliella, Hemigrapha and Labrocarpon. Members of the family are characterised by small, dark, rounded to lirelliform ascomata, hyaline to brown single-septum spores, and association with a trentepohlioid green algal photobiont.

== Taxonomy ==
Melaspileaceae was described by William Watson in 1929, but the name was seldom used because the type genus and its position were unclear. Eremithallales was circumscribed as a new order in 2008, and Eremithallus costaricensis was originally described as its sole member. A multi-locus analysis in 2015 clarified the limits and placement of the group: Melaspileaceae is the single family of Eremithallales, and within it the authors included Melaspilea (in the strict sense) together with the rock-dwelling genus Encephalographa. In the same work, Eremithallaceae was placed in synonymy under Melaspileaceae, and Eremithallus was treated as a younger synonym of Melaspilea (with the new combination Melaspilea costaricensis). The study also showed that many taxa formerly kept in Melaspileaceae actually fall in Asterinales. In that order, lichenicolous and saprobic lineages are intermixed, and family placement remains uncertain for several genera. Earlier results that had suggested an affinity of Eremithallales to Lichinales were not recovered; instead, Eremithallales clustered within Dothideomycetes.

== Description ==
Members of Melaspileaceae share a consistent suite of features reflecting their placement in Eremithallales. Thalli, when present, are thin and whitish, growing mainly on bark (corticolous) and associated with a trentepohlioid green-algal partner (genus Trentepohlia). The fruiting bodies (ascomata) are small, dark, and usually rounded or short-lirelliform. They begin immersed in the substrate, then break through (erumpent) and finally become superficial, with a flat to slightly convex disc bordered by a low rim sometimes fringed by minute lobules of bark tissue. The exciple is dark reddish-brown and turns olive in potassium hydroxide solution (K+ olivaceous). The hymenium is non-amyloid, and the filaments between asci (paraphyses) are slender, sometimes branched or anastomosing but not swollen at the tips.

The spore-bearing cells (asci) are elongate-club-shaped (clavate) to nearly cylindrical, eight-spored, with a thickened apex and a distinct ocular chamber that shows no iodine reaction (I−, K/I−). Ascospores are smooth, ellipsoid, one-septate, hyaline when young and brown at maturity, usually constricted at the septum, and in some material surrounded by a gelatinous sheath that turns blue after KOH and iodine treatment (K/I+).
