= Taeniolella serusiauxii =

Scientific classification
- Kingdom: Fungi
- Division: Ascomycota
- Class: Dothideomycetes
- Order: Mytilinidiales
- Family: Mytilinidiaceae
- Genus: Taeniolella
- Species: T. serusiauxii

Binomial name
- Taeniolella serusiauxii Diederich (1992)

Species of fungus

Taeniolella serusiauxii is a species of lichenicolous fungus in the family Mytilinidiaceae. It was described as a new species in 1992 by Paul Diederich. The type was collected in France, where it was found growing on Dendrographa decolorans. The specific epithet serusiauxii honours the Belgian lichenologist Emmanuël Sérusiaux.

The fungus is an anamorph, with little differentiated mycelium. Its conidia are coarsely cracked and fissured (rhagadiose) to scaley (squamulose), measuring 5–22 by 3.5–6.5 μm, often with long more or less translucent germ tubes; the conidiophores are 2.5–5 μm wide. The fungus has been recorded from Brazil, British Overseas Territories, France, Papua New Guinea, Tanzania, and the United States. It grows on the lichens Dendrographa decolorans, Tylophoron moderatum, and T. protrudens.
