= Zoggium =

Scientific classification
- Kingdom: Fungi
- Division: Ascomycota
- Class: Dothideomycetes
- Order: Mytilinidiales
- Family: Mytilinidiaceae
- Genus: Zoggium; Lar.N.Vassiljeva (2001)

Type species
- Zoggium mayorii (H.Zogg) Lar.N.Vassiljeva (2001)

Synonyms
- Lophium mayorii H.Zogg (1952)

Genus of fungi

Zoggium is a fungal genus in the family Mytilinidiaceae. A monotypic genus, it contains the single species Zoggium mayorii, named after mycologist Hans Zogg. The species was originally described in 1952 as a species of Lophium by Zogg, who noted that it differed from other Lophium species in that its peridia were less fragile because of a rigid ascomata. In 2001, Vasilyeva considered the morphological differences sufficient to erect a new genus to contain the species. Z. mayorii is found in the Russian Far East and the Swiss and French Alps.
