= Buelliella lecanorae =

Scientific classification
- Kingdom: Fungi
- Division: Ascomycota
- Class: Dothideomycetes
- Order: Asterinales
- Family: Stictographaceae
- Genus: Buelliella
- Species: B. lecanorae

Binomial name
- Buelliella lecanorae Suija & Alstrup (2004)

Species of lichen

Buelliella lecanorae is a species of lichenicolous (lichen-eating) fungus in the class Dothideomycetes. It is found in a few locations in Estonia and in Crimea, where it grows parasitically on members of the Lecanora subfusca species group.

== Taxonomy ==
Buelliella lecanorae was formally described as a new species in 2004 by lichenologists Ave Suija and Vagn Alstrup. The type specimen was collected from a churchyard in Suure-Jaani (Viljandi County); there, the fungus was found growing parasitically on the crustose lichen Lecanora chlarotera, which itself was growing as an epiphyte on Norway maple. The species epithet lecanorae refers to the genus of the host lichen.

== Description ==
The ascomata of Buelliella lecanorae are in the form of small, rounded to irregularly shaped black apothecia (up to 0.2 in diameter), which are scattered over the thallus of the host. The asci are broadly club-shaped (clavate), measure about 50–57 by 18–20 μm, and usually contain eight spores (some have six). The ascospores, which are divided into two cells by a single septum, are smooth, ellipsoid, and measure 16–20.5 by 6.5–9.5 μm. They are initially colourless before turning brown.

== Habitat and distribution ==
Buelliella lecanorae was originally known to occur only in a few locations in Estonia. In 2014, it was reported from Novyi Svit, a nature reserve in Crimea. It parasitizes members of the Lecanora subfusca species group, which also includes Lecanora chlarotera, L. pulicaris, and L. argentata. The relationship between the fungus and lichen appears to be commensalistic, as the fungus does not appear to cause visible damage to the host.
