= Actidium =

Scientific classification
- Kingdom: Fungi
- Division: Ascomycota
- Class: Dothideomycetes
- Order: Mytilinidiales
- Family: Mytilinidiaceae
- Genus: Actidium; Fr.

Type species
- Actidium hysterioides Fr.

Genus of fungi in the family Mytilinidiaceae

Actidium is a genus of fungi in the family Mytilinidiaceae.
