= Camaroglobulus =

Scientific classification
- Kingdom: Fungi
- Division: Ascomycota
- Class: Dothideomycetes
- Order: Mytilinidiales
- Family: Mytilinidiaceae
- Genus: Camaroglobulus; Speer (1986)

Type species
- Camaroglobulus resinae Speer (1986)

Genus of fungi

Camaroglobulus is a fungal genus in the family Mytilinidiaceae. It is monotypic, containing the single anamorphic species Camaroglobulus resinae, found in Brazil and described as new to science in 1986.
