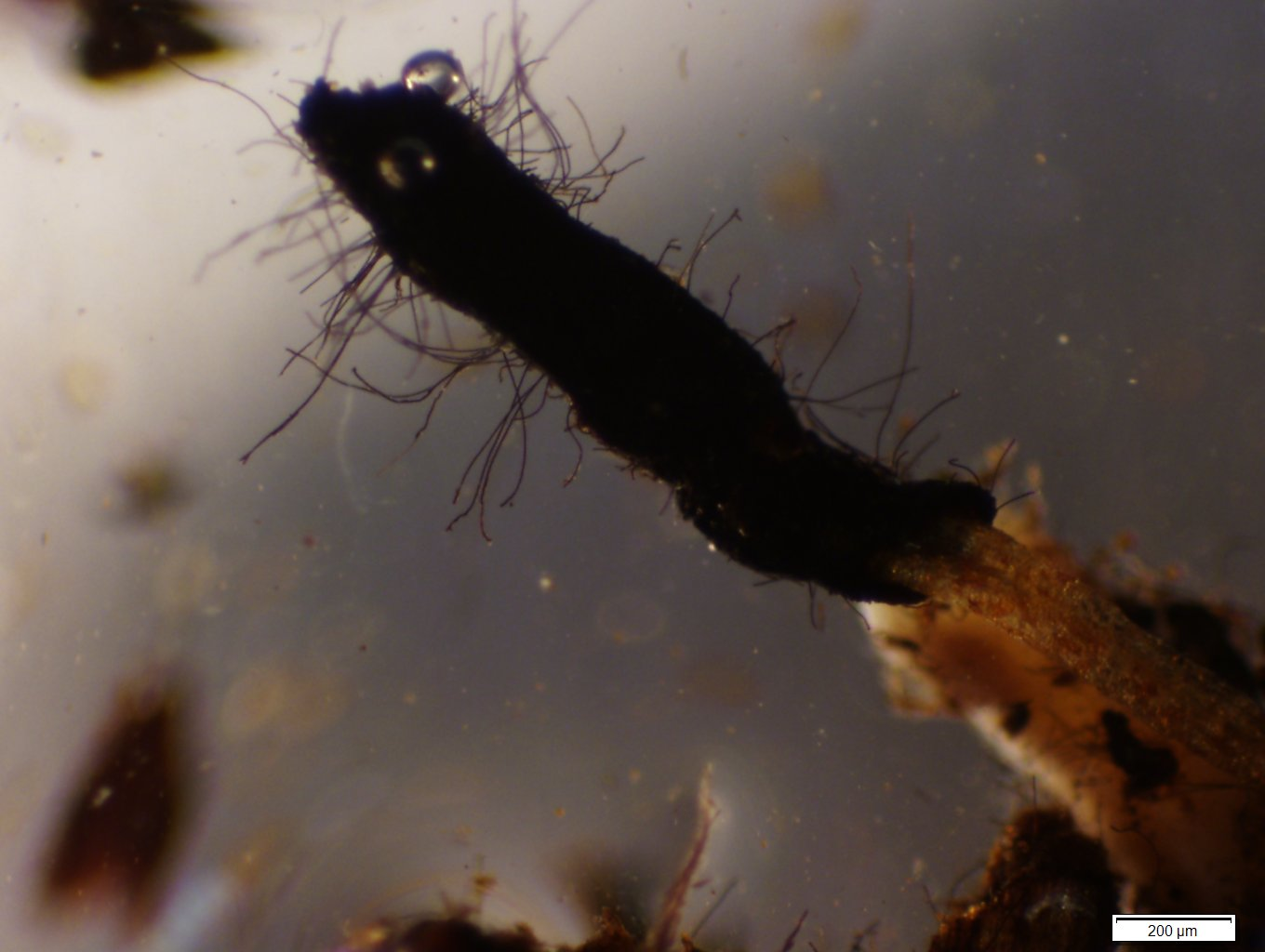
- Cenococcum geophilum ectomycorrhiza

Scientific classification
- Kingdom: Fungi
- Division: Ascomycota
- Class: Dothideomycetes
- Order: Gloniales
- Family: Gloniaceae
- Genus: Cenococcum
- Species: C. geophilum

Binomial name
- Cenococcum geophilum Fr. (1829)

= Cenococcum geophilum =

Species of fungus

Cenococcum geophilum Fr., synonym Cenococcum graniforme (Sow.) Ferd. and Winge, is an Ascomycete fungal species and is the only member in the genus Cenococcum. It is one of the most common ectomycorrhizal fungal species encountered in forest ecosystems. The geographic distribution of the species is notably cosmopolitan; it is found in ecosystems with a wide range of environmental conditions, and in many cases in high relative frequency. Because of its wide distribution and abundance in forest soils, it is one of the most well-studied ectomycorrhizal fungal species. While the species has long been known to be sterile and not produce asexual or sexual spores, cryptic sexual stages may exist. The hyphae produced by C. geophilum are characterized by their thick (1.5-8 um), straight and jet black appearance with little branching. They usually form monopodial (unbranched) ectomycorrhizas. The mantles of C. geophilum ectomycorrhizas are usually thick with few to many emanating hyphae.

== Taxonomy ==
Originally described in 1800 from its sclerotia by James Sowerby, the species was named Lycoperdon graniforme Sow. Later, Elias Fries introduced the genus Cenococcum and the sole species was called Cenococcum geophilum Fr. These names were later combined to form Cenococcum graniforme (Sow) Ferd. and Winge in the monographic study of the species by Ferdinandsen and Winge in 1925. Hatch identified hyphae that formed ectomycorrhizas with “jet-black” mantles calling it Mycelium radicus-nigrostrigosum Hatch. Finally, Linhell linked the fungi forming the ectomycorrhizas to the fungus producing the sclerotia earlier described. The officially accepted name for the species is Cenococcum geophilum Fr. Molecular analyses have revealed that C. geophilum is not closely related to other Ascomycete ectomycorrhizal fungi (mostly in the Pezizales) and is actually a member of the Dothideomycetes. Cenococcum geophilum is the only known ectomycorrhizal member of the Dothideomycetes. Spatafora et al. (2012) placed C. geophilum in the Gloniaceae as a close relative to members of the Genus Glonium.

== Ecology ==
=== Abundance and distribution ===
It is not unusual to find Cenococcum geophilum mycelium and ectomycorrhizas in high relative frequency in soil where ectomycorrhizal tree hosts are present. Unlike many ectomycorrhizal fungi, Cenococcum geophilum readily colonizes the fine roots of most ectomycorrhizal hosts. It may be found in all forest successional stages. Unlike most ectomycorrhizal fungal species, Cenococcum geophilum appears to have no distinct vertical distribution in the organic horizons of soil though it appears to prefer organic horizons to mineral soil. Cenococcum geophilum also appears to have an even horizontal spatial distribution pattern at the microscale and site level. This unusual distributional pattern may be the result of wide niche breadth of Cenococcum geophilum and/or genetic variation within the species. A factor that may contribute to this wide niche breadth is the species ability to tolerate a wide range of stressors. Cenococcum geophilum isolates have been shown to tolerate freezing, salinity, and heavy metal stressors, but is probably best known for its ability to tolerate water stress. Hasselquist et al. (2005) found evidence that suggests that increased colonization of fine roots of Douglas fir seedlings by C. geophilum may alleviate water stress of the host plant during periods of low water availability. Melanin biosynthesis, which is quite high in C. geophilum, gives its hyphae the “jet-black” appearance, and has been linked with stress tolerance in fungi. It may thus be a key functional trait reducing water stress in C. geophilum. Other potential traits that C. geophilum may employ for water stress tolerance include the production and accumulation of compatible osmolytes and the production of heat shock proteins. Nitrogen fertilization appears to have negative effects on the abundance of C. geophilum, which may be the result of host trees allocating less carbon to ectomycorrhizal symbiosis when nitrogen in the soil becomes non-limiting to the plant growth.

=== Enzyme production and nutrient acquisition ===
Along with other species of ectomycorrhizal fungi, C. geophilum produces extracellular enzymes that are able to hydrolyze substrates found in the soil to access and acquire nutrients important to itself and its host plant. The ectomycorrhizas of C. geophilum have been shown to hydrolyze ^{14}C labeled substrate common in plant litters, including hemicellulose and cellulose. Cenococcum geophilum ectomycorrhizas have also been shown to produce high levels of laccase, glucuronidase, and xylodase and phosphatase enzymes.

=== Carbon sequestration ===
In the light of climate change there is growing interest in understanding carbon sequestration in mycorrhizal fungal tissues. There is considerable evidence suggesting that C. geophilum mycelium, ectomycorrhizas and sclerotia are highly resistant to decay and have potential to sequester a great deal of carbon in their tissues. Fernandez et al. (2013) found that C. geophilum ectomycorrhizas persisted considerably longer in the soil than those of other ectomycorrhizal fungi. This resistance to decay is likely related to the heavy melanization of the cell wall found in C. geophilum hyphae which cannot be degraded with hydrolyzing enzymes and requires the implementation of oxidative enzymes, much like lignin in plant litters. Cenococcum geophilum produces resting structures called sclerotia. These structures have been found to remain viable in the soil for years. Remarkably, these structures are known to persist relatively undecomposed in the soil for thousands of years.

=== Genetic diversity and cryptic speciation ===
Once regarded as a single species, observed variation in morphology, growth rates and response to growth conditions among C. geophilum isolates led researchers to speculate on possibility of cryptic speciation. Advances in molecular techniques have allowed researchers to test this hypothesis by examining the genetic variation in C. geophilum strains at various spatial scales. LoBuglio et al. 1991 examined the degree of variation in the ribosomal DNA across 71 isolates of C. geophilum of varying geographic origin (distinct to similar) and found a great deal of genetic variation across the isolates. A high degree of genetic variation of C. geophilum has been repeatedly observed at the stand level. Douhan & Rizzo (2005) found phylogenetically distinct lineages of C. geophilum at the scale of the soil sample supporting the hypothesis that there is cryptic sympatric speciation occurring in C. geophilum.
