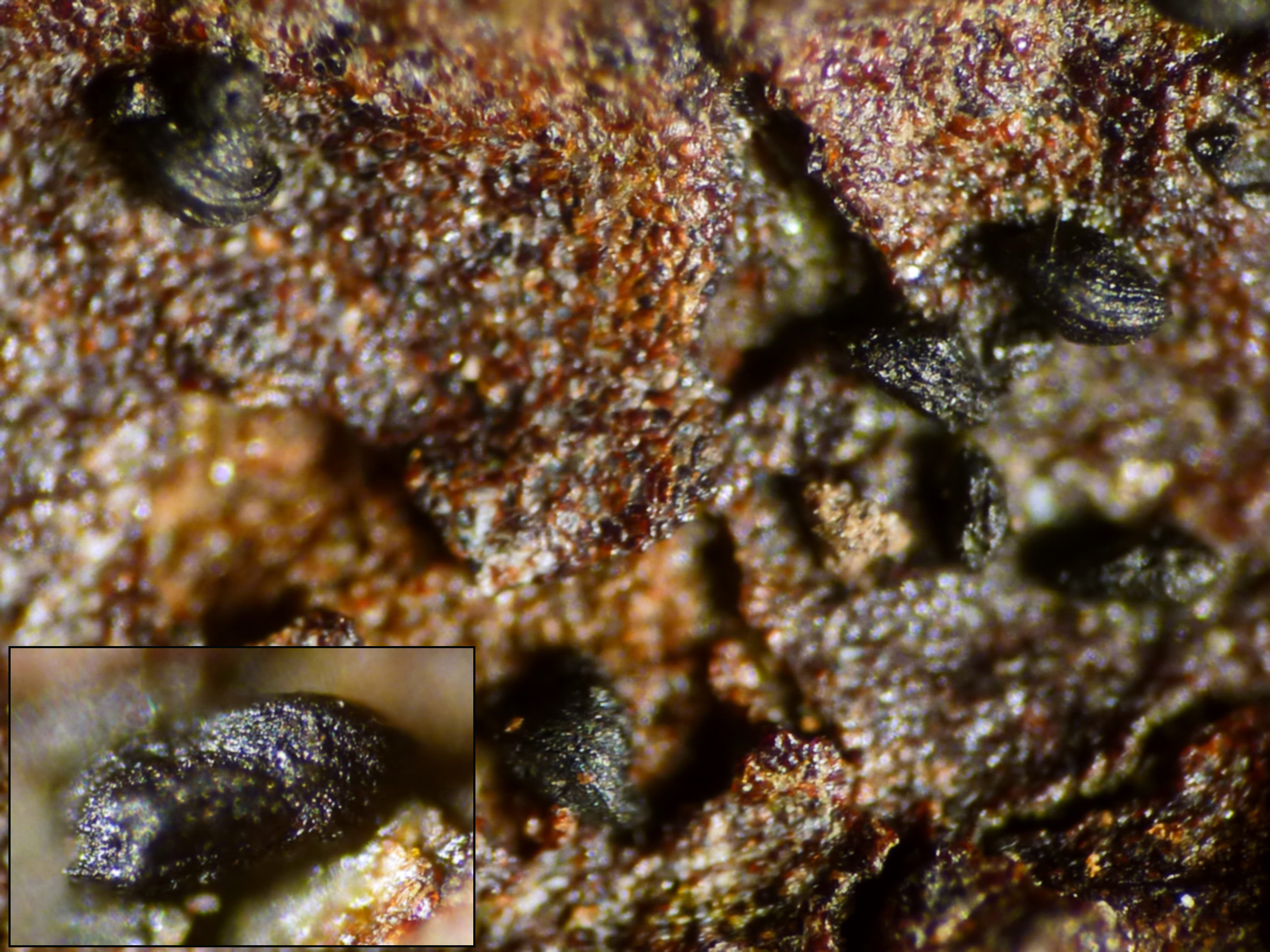
- Mytilinidion tortile

Scientific classification
- Kingdom: Fungi
- Division: Ascomycota
- Class: Dothideomycetes
- Order: Mytilinidiales
- Family: Mytilinidiaceae
- Genus: Mytilinidion; Duby (1861)

Type species
- Mytilinidion aggregatum (DC.) Duby (1862)

Synonyms
- Mytilidion Sacc. (1875); Murashkinskija Petr. (1928)

= Mytilinidion =

Genus of fungi

Mytilinidion is a genus of fungi in the family Mytilinidiaceae. The genus was described by Swiss clergyman and botanist Jean Étienne Duby in 1861.

== Species ==
- Mytilinidion acicola
- Mytilinidion aggregatum
- Mytilinidion andinense
- Mytilinidion australe
- Mytilinidion carpinaceum
- Mytilinidion decipiens
- Mytilinidion dubyi
- Mytilinidion gemmigenum
- Mytilinidion juniperi
- Mytilinidion kamatii
- Mytilinidion mytilinellum
- Mytilinidion oblongisporum
- Mytilinidion parvulum
- Mytilinidion resinae
- Mytilinidion resinicola
- Mytilinidion rhenanum
- Mytilinidion scolecosporum
- Mytilinidion thujae
- Mytilinidion thujarum
- Mytilinidion tortile
