= Quasiconcha =

Scientific classification
- Kingdom: Fungi
- Division: Ascomycota
- Class: Dothideomycetes
- Order: Mytilinidiales
- Family: Mytilinidiaceae
- Genus: Quasiconcha; M.E. Barr & M. Blackw.

Type species
- Quasiconcha reticulata M.E. Barr & M. Blackw.

Genus of fungi

Quasiconcha is a genus of fungi in the family Mytilinidiaceae. A monotypic genus, it contains the single species Quasiconcha reticulata.
