= Ostreola =

Scientific classification
- Domain: Eukaryota
- Kingdom: Fungi
- Division: Ascomycota
- Class: Dothideomycetes
- Order: Mytilinidiales
- Family: Mytilinidiaceae
- Genus: Ostreola; Darker

Type species
- Ostreola consociata Darker

Genus of fungi

Ostreola is a genus of fungi in the family Mytilinidiaceae.

Ostreola may also be used to refer to also a genus of oyster in the family Ostreidae; however, this name is unaccepted and Ostrea should be used instead.
