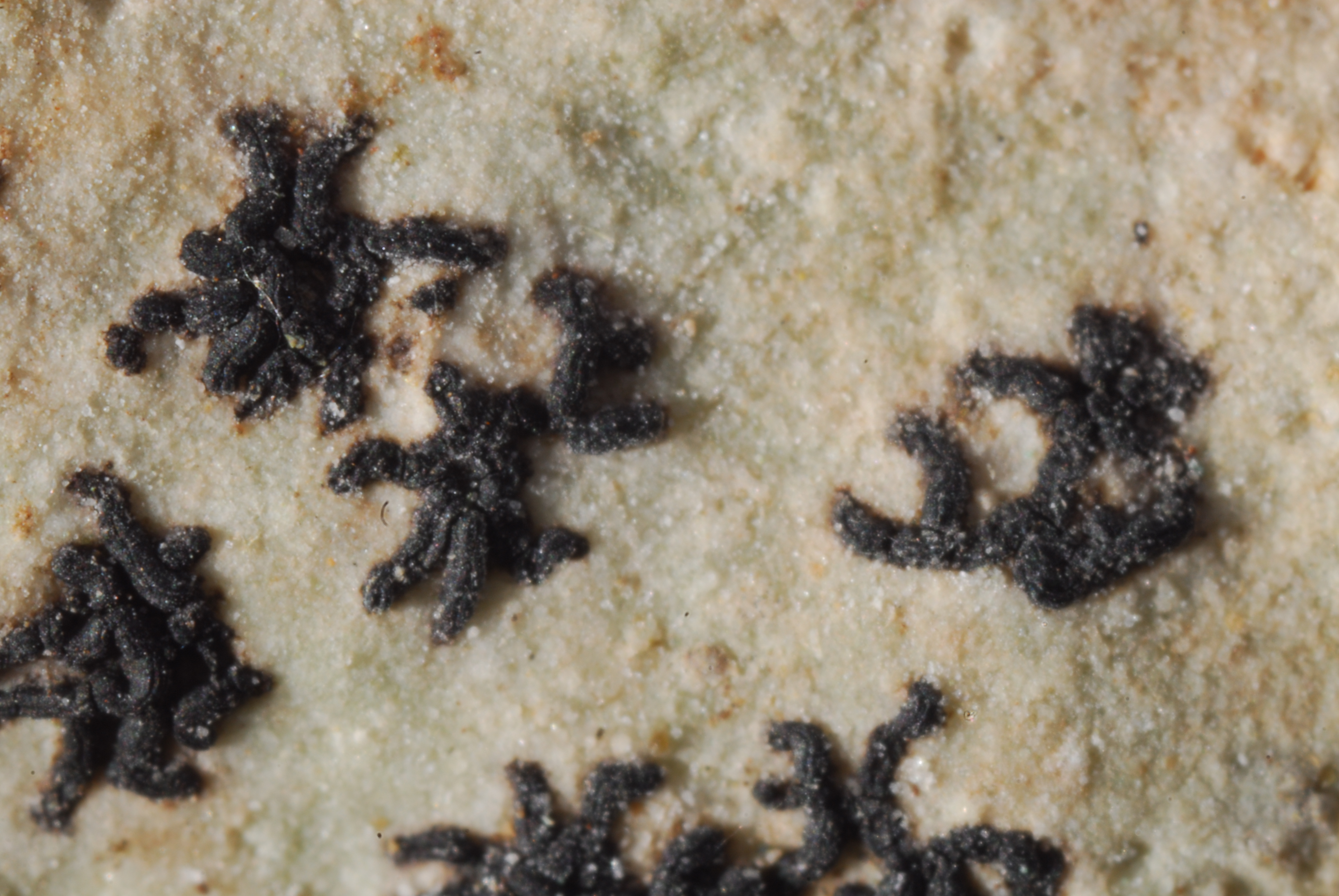
- E. elisae

Scientific classification
- Domain: Eukaryota
- Kingdom: Fungi
- Division: Ascomycota
- Class: Dothideomycetes
- Order: Eremithallales
- Family: Melaspileaceae
- Genus: Encephalographa; A.Massal. (1854)

Species
- E. anthracothecii E. elisae E. otagensis

= Encephalographa =

Genus of lichens

Encephalographa is a small genus of lichen-forming fungi in the family Melaspileaceae. It comprises three species characterized by their black, superficial ascomata (fruiting bodies) that form dense clusters, typically growing on rock surfaces. The genus is distinguished by its lirelliform (line-shaped) fruiting bodies with a narrow slit-like disk, and a dark exciple surrounding the spore-bearing hymenium. Originally proposed by Abramo Bartolommeo Massalongo in 1854, the genus has undergone several taxonomic revisions before molecular phylogenetics studies confirmed its placement in Melaspileaceae.

== Taxonomy ==
The genus was formally established (circumscribed) by Abramo Bartolommeo Massalongo in 1854. Encephalographa elisae was designated as the lectotype species by Josef Hafellner in 1984.

The taxonomic placement of Encephalographa has been revised multiple times. Initially, it was placed in Hysteriaceae by Renobales and Aguirre (1990), but molecular phylogenetics studies by Boehm and colleagues (2009) demonstrated that it does not belong to this family. Ertz and Diederich (2015) conducted phylogenetic analyses based on nuLSU sequence data that indicated Encephalographa should be placed in Melaspileaceae. Their findings showed that Encephalographa is related to Melaspilea in the strict sense (sensu stricto), though it differs morphologically by its dichotomously branched, laterally anastomosed, lirelliform ascomata with a longitudinal groove (sulcus).

While Encephalographa elisae was previously considered non-lichenized, later studies by Tretiach and Modenesi (1999) and Roux and colleagues (2014) have confirmed the species is lichenized. This classification aligns with other members of the Eremithallales clade.

The genus is distinguished from Melaspilea by its black, superficial, lirelliform, saxicolous ascomata that are densely aggregated in compact clusters, with the disk reduced to a narrow slit. It possesses a massive, dark brown to black lateral and basal exciple, and a non-amyloid hymenium with a dense network of branched and anastomosed paraphyses.

== Description ==
Encephalographa species are characterized by their distinctive fruiting bodies (ascomata) that grow on rock surfaces. These ascomata are black, superficial (growing on the surface rather than embedded), and have a distinctive elongated shape resembling small lines or cracks (lirelliform). A notable feature is how these fruiting bodies cluster together densely in compact groups, creating distinctive patterns on the substrate.

The ascomata have a structure with a disc (the spore-bearing surface) that is reduced to a narrow slit, rather than being openly exposed as in many other lichens. They possess a substantial protective outer layer (exciple) that is dark brown to black in colour, which forms both around the sides and beneath the fruiting body. Inside the ascomata, Encephalographa contains a clear gel-like layer (hymenium) that does not turn blue when stained with iodine (non-amyloid), a feature used for identification purposes. The hymenium contains a dense network of branched and interconnected filaments (paraphyses) that support the reproductive structures.

The reproductive cells (asci) are club-shaped to somewhat cylindrical, containing eight spores each. The asci have walls that are thickened at the top and contain a distinct chamber (ocular chamber). The spores themselves are ellipsoid in shape, divided by a single septum (1-septate), and can range from smooth to finely ornamented. When young, the spores are colourless (hyaline), but they develop a brownish colour as they mature. The spores also feature a thin outer covering known as a perispore.

== Species ==
- Encephalographa anthracothecii Diederich (1997)
- Encephalographa elisae A.Massal. (1855)
- Encephalographa otagensis (Linds.) Müll.Arg. (1894)

Some species formerly placed in this genus have since been reclassified in other genera:

- Encephalographa cerebrina (DC.) A.Massal. (1856) is now Poeltinula cerebrina
- Encephalographa cerebrinella (Nyl.) Zahlbr. (1903) is now Poeltinula cerebrinella
- Encephalographa interjecta (Leight.) Th.Fr. (1874) is now Melaspilea interjecta
- Encephalographa pulvinata (Rehm ex Arnold) Müll.Arg. (1881) is now Opegrapha pulvinata
