= Stictographaceae =

Scientific classification
- Kingdom: Fungi
- Division: Ascomycota
- Class: Dothideomycetes
- Order: Asterinales
- Family: Stictographaceae; D.Q. Dai & K.D. Hyde (2018)

Type genus
- Stictographa

Genera
- Buelliella; Karschia; Labrocarpon; Melaspileopsis; Stictographa

Family of fungi

Stictographaceae is an family of fungus in the order Asterinales.
