= Lophium =

Scientific classification
- Kingdom: Fungi
- Division: Ascomycota
- Class: Dothideomycetes
- Order: Mytilinidiales
- Family: Mytilinidiaceae
- Genus: Lophium; Fr. (1818)

Type species
- Lophium mytilinum (Pers.) Fr. (1818)

Species
- L. barbarum L. caulicola L. elegans L. igoschinae L. mytilinum

Synonyms
- Lophidium P.Karst. (1873); Scolecostroma Bat. & Peres (1960)

Genus of fungi

Lophium is a genus of fungi in the family Mytilinidiaceae. It was described by Swedish mycologist Elias Magnus Fries in 1818.
