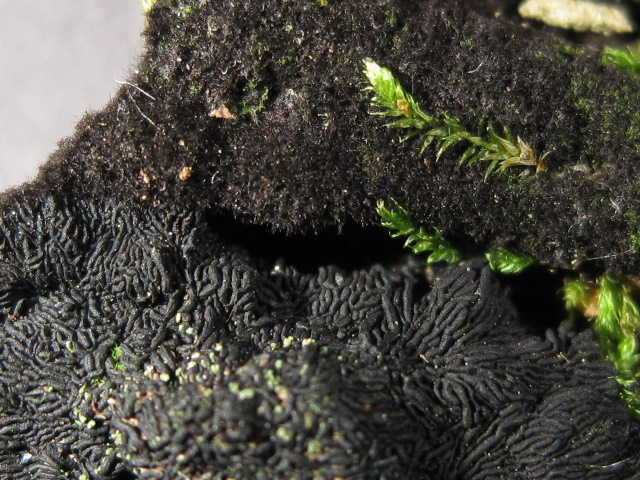
- Glonium stellatum

Scientific classification
- Domain: Eukaryota
- Kingdom: Fungi
- Division: Ascomycota
- Class: Dothideomycetes
- Order: Gloniales
- Family: Gloniaceae
- Genus: Glonium; Muhl. ex Fr.

= Glonium =

Genus of fungi

Glonium is a genus of fungi belonging to the family Gloniaceae.

The genus was first described by Gotthilf Heinrich Ernst Muhlenberg in 1813.

Species:

- Glonium graphicum
- Glonium lineare
