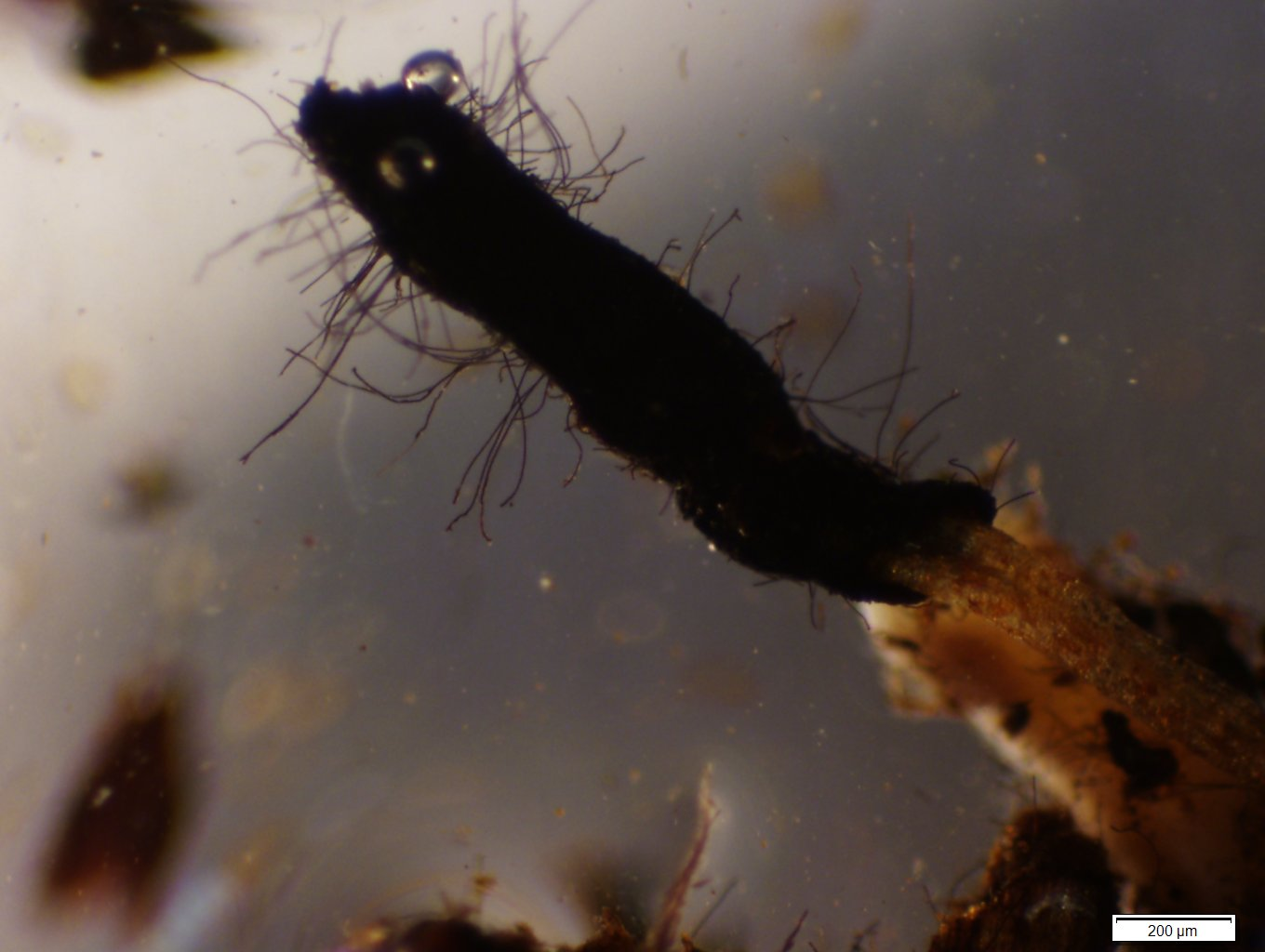

Scientific classification
- Kingdom: Fungi
- Division: Ascomycota
- Class: Dothideomycetes
- Order: Gloniales
- Family: Gloniaceae
- Genus: Cenococcum; Moug. & Fr. (1829)

Type species
- Cenococcum geophilum

Species
- C. geophilum C. graniforme

= Cenococcum =

Genus of fungi

Cenococcum is a genus of two species of fungi in the family Gloniaceae.
