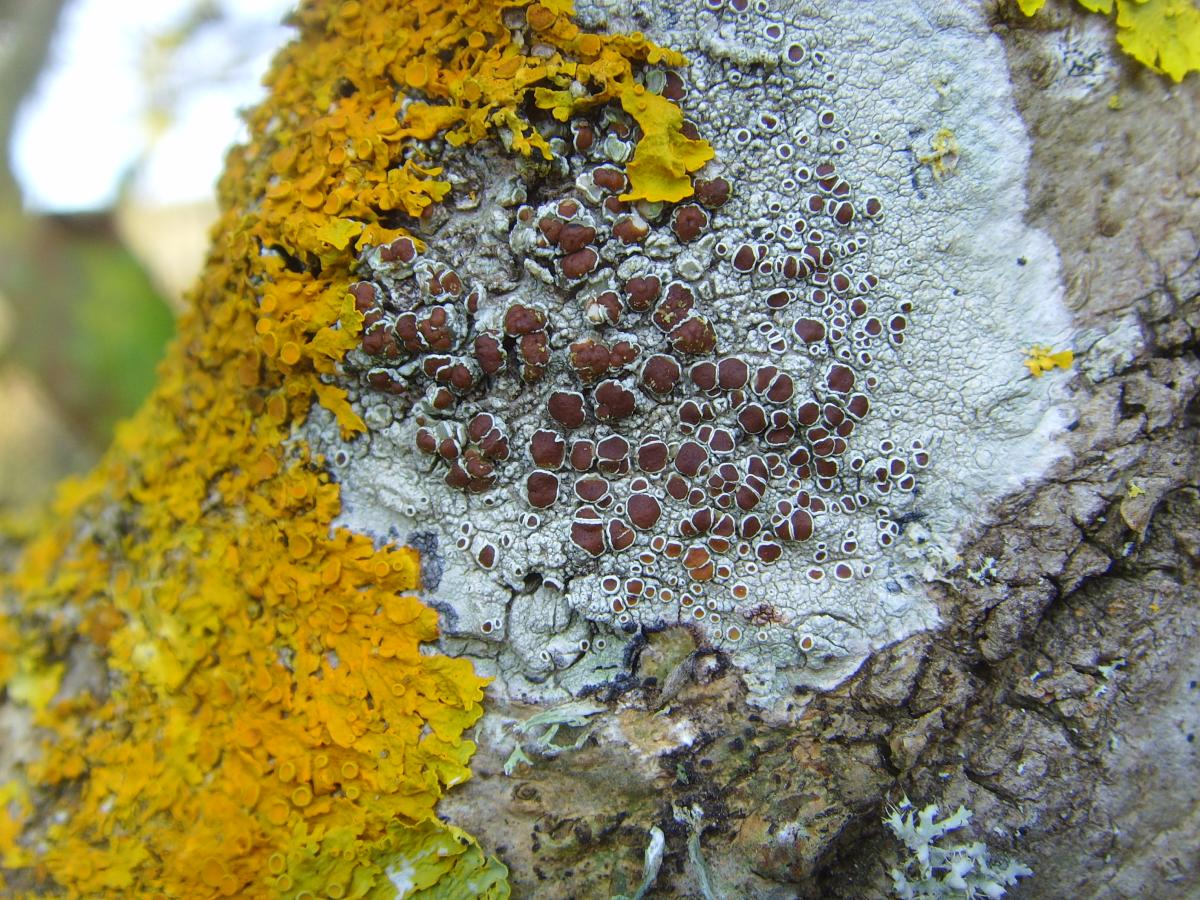

Scientific classification
- Kingdom: Fungi
- Division: Ascomycota
- Class: Lecanoromycetes
- Order: Lecanorales
- Family: Lecanoraceae
- Genus: Lecanora
- Species: L. argentata

Binomial name
- Lecanora argentata (Ach.) Malme (1897)

Synonyms
- List: Parmelia subfusca var. argentata Ach. (1803); Urceolaria acharii var. argentata Ach. (1810); Lecanora subfusca f. argentata (Ach.) Flot. (1849); Lecanora subfusca var. argentata (Ach.) Boistel (1903); Lecanora allophana f. argentata (Ach.) Savicz (1916); Lecanora argentata (Ach.) Malme (1932); Lecanora subfuscata H.Magn. (1932)

= Lecanora argentata =

Species of lichen

Lecanora argentata is a widely distributed species of corticolous (bark-dwelling) in the family Lecanoraceae. It was originally described in 1803 by Swedish lichenologist Erik Acharius, as a variety of Parmelia subfusca. Gustaf Oskar Andersson Malme transferred it to the genus Lecanora in 1897.

== See also ==
- List of Lecanora species
