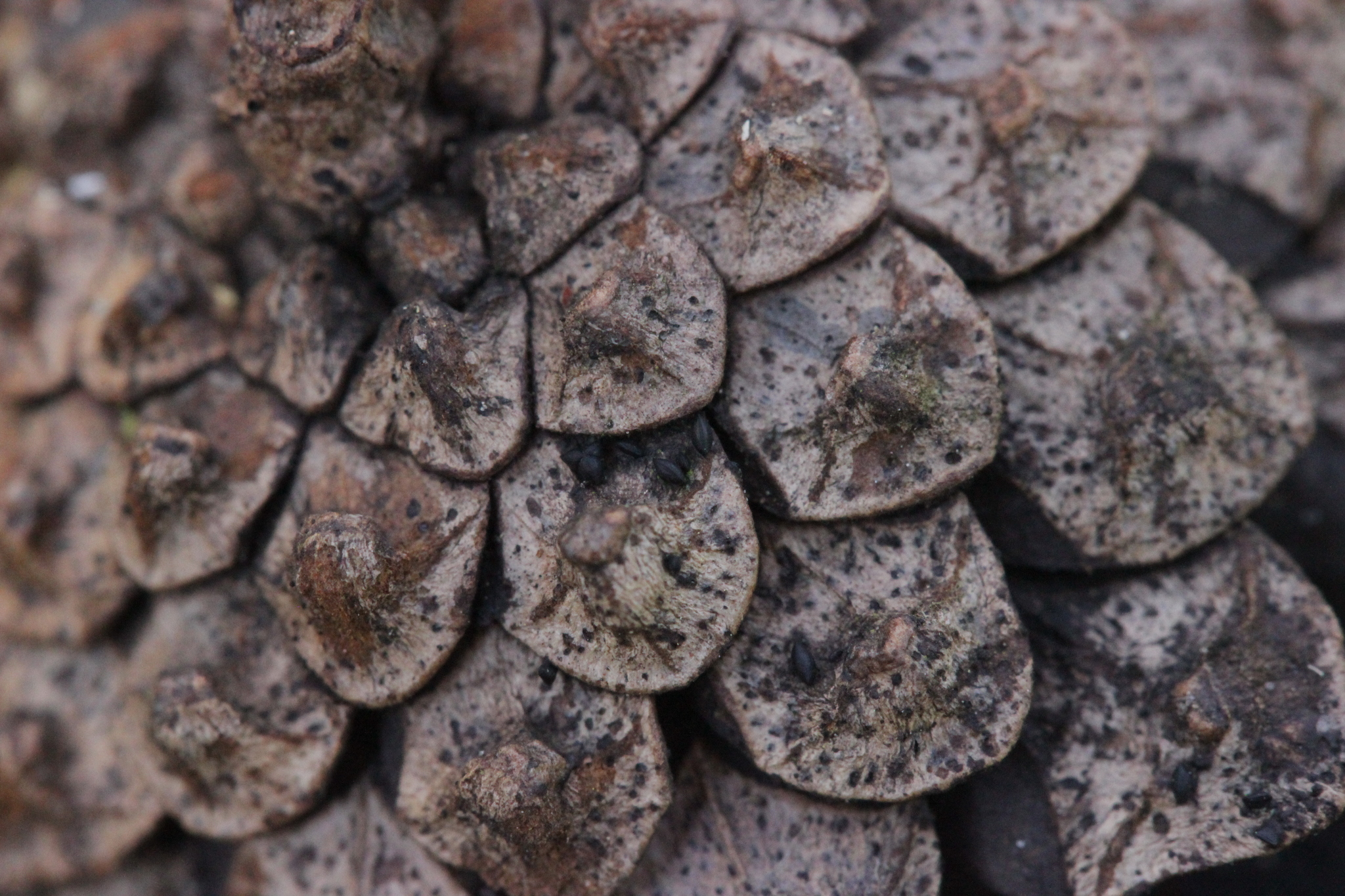
- Lophium mytilinum

Scientific classification
- Kingdom: Fungi
- Division: Ascomycota
- Class: Dothideomycetes
- Order: Mytilinidiales
- Family: Mytilinidiaceae; Kirschst. (1924)

Genera
- Actidium; Camaroglobulus; Lophium; Mytilinidion; Ostreichnion; Ostreola; Peyronelia; Quasiconcha; Taeniolella; Zoggium

= Mytilinidiaceae =

Family of fungi

The Mytilinidiaceae are a family of fungi in the order Mytilinidiales. Taxa in the family are widely distributed, particularly in temperate zones, and are usually saprobic on woody tissue, especially gymnosperms.
