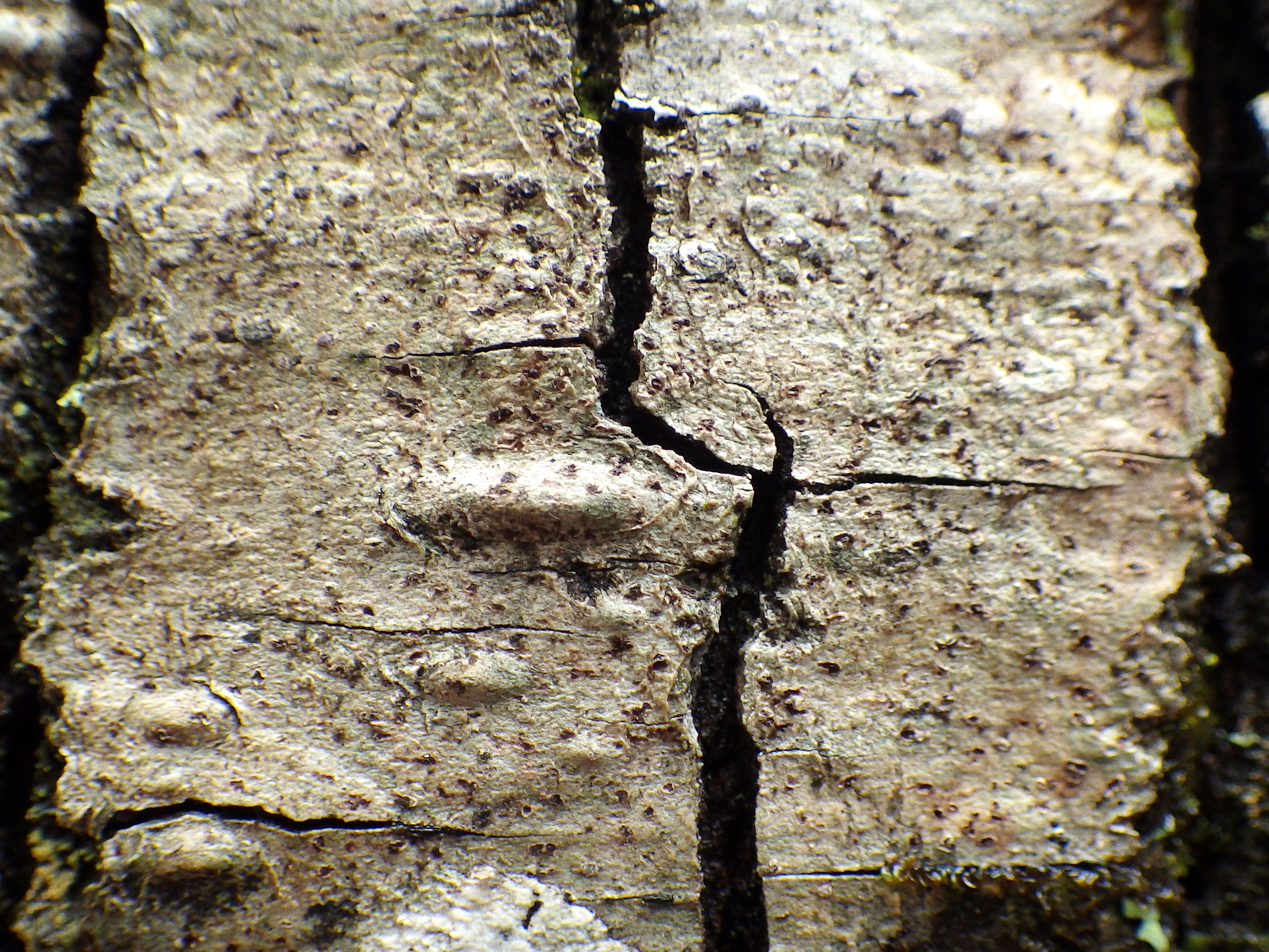
- Melaspilea ochrothalamia, found in Sintra, Portugal

Scientific classification
- Kingdom: Fungi
- Division: Ascomycota
- Class: Dothideomycetes
- Order: Eremithallales
- Family: Melaspileaceae
- Genus: Melaspilea; Nyl. (1857)

Type species
- Melaspilea arthonioides (A.Massal.) Nyl. (1857)

Species
- See text

Synonyms
- Celidium sect. Melaspileella P.Karst. (1885); Hazslinszkya Körb. (1861); Melanographa Müll.Arg. (1882); Melaspileomyces Cif. & Tomas. (1953); Stictographa Mudd (1861); Eremithallus Lücking, Lumbsch & L.Umaña (2008)

= Melaspilea =

Genus of lichen-forming fungi

Melaspilea is a genus of fungi in the family Melaspileaceae. The genus includes both lichen-forming species that grow on tree bark and lichenicolous species that parasitise other lichens. Originally, Melaspilea encompassed a broad and diverse group of species, but a 2015 molecular study narrowed its circumscription, showing that many species historically placed in the genus actually belonged to unrelated lineages. In its current sense, Melaspilea belongs to the family Melaspileaceae and order Eremithallales within Dothideomycetes and is characterised by dark fruiting bodies with single-septum spores. The genus has a worldwide distribution but is particularly diverse in tropical regions, with species primarily found growing on the bark of trees and woody plants.

== Taxonomy ==
The genus was established by the Finnish lichenologist William Nylander in 1857. In his original description, Nylander characterized Melaspilea as having a thin or inconspicuous thallus and a black apothecium with a superficial or simple disc that is often convex. The genus was distinguished by its discrete paraphyses, ovoid to somewhat uncoloured single septum spores measuring 8 micrometres, and lack of a hymenial gelatin. The type species, M. arthonioides, was described from specimens collected on ash trees (Fraxinus) near Philippeville, Algeria. Nylander noted that while the species was rare in France, particularly on elm trees, it was not truly found there in a well-developed state. He also described a second species, M. deformis, characterized by its reduced thallus, small or medium-sized rounded or deformed apothecium, and occurrence on oak, walnut, and ash trees in Switzerland.

For much of its history, names placed in Melaspilea formed a heterogeneous assemblage with uncertain rank and placement; different authors treated parts of the group in Arthoniomycetes, Graphidales, Patellariaceae and Buelliaceae, or as lichenicolous outliers, reflecting the lack of a stable circumscription.

A multi-locus phylogenetic study in 2015 dismantled the broad, traditional concept of the genus and family. It showed that Melaspilea (in the broad sense) is polyphyletic: Melaspilea in the strict sense belongs in the order Eremithallales within Dothideomycetes, together with the rock-dwelling genus Encephalographa; Eremithallaceae is treated as a synonym of Melaspileaceae. In the same work, the authors subsumed Eremithallus into Melaspilea and made the new combinations Melaspilea costaricensis, Melaspilea enteroleuca and Melaspilea urceolata. Many other species historically assigned to Melaspilea were shown to belong in Asterinales and are best treated in segregate genera such as Melaspileella, Melaspileopsis and Stictographa. The revised framework reflects that superficially similar dark, 1-septate ascomata have evolved repeatedly in unrelated lineages, and that lichenised and lichenicolous lifestyles are intermingled within Asterinales.

== Description ==
Melaspilea (in the strict sense) forms a thin, whitish, bark-inhabiting (corticolous) thallus with a trentepohlioid green-algal partner (Trentepohlia). The ascomata are usually rounded to short-lirelliform, immersed at first, then erumpent and finally superficial, with a flat to slightly convex disc bordered by a low, sometimes lobulate margin. The exciple is dark reddish-brown and turns olive-brown with potassium hydroxide solution (K+ olivaceous). The hymenium is non-amyloid (does not turn blue with iodine).

Asci are elongate clavate to somewhat cylindrical with a thickened apex and a distinct ocular chamber, each typically containing eight 1-septate ascospores. The spores are ellipsoid, smooth, hyaline when young and brown at maturity, and commonly constricted at the septum. In some material a gelatinous sheath becomes blue after KOH pretreatment followed by iodine (K/I-positive), but the taxonomic weight of this sheath is uncertain. Filamentous paraphyses are simple to branched and not markedly swollen at the tips. Reports of photobiont cell clusters within bark periderm cells connected to the apothecia by hyaline hyphae pertain to Central American material formerly segregated as Eremithallus and are not considered diagnostic for the genus as currently circumscribed.

== Habitat, distribution, and ecology ==
Species of Melaspilea are primarily corticolous, meaning they grow on the bark of trees and woody plants. The genus has a worldwide distribution but appears more diverse in tropical regions, though it is also well-represented in temperate areas. For example, eleven species have been accepted in the lichen flora of Great Britain and Ireland. M. enteroleuca is consistently corticolous on old trees and has records across much of Europe, with reports in North Africa and Asia; by contrast, M. urceolata is American. M. costaricensis (the former Eremithallus) is confirmed from Costa Rica and Saba.

== Species ==
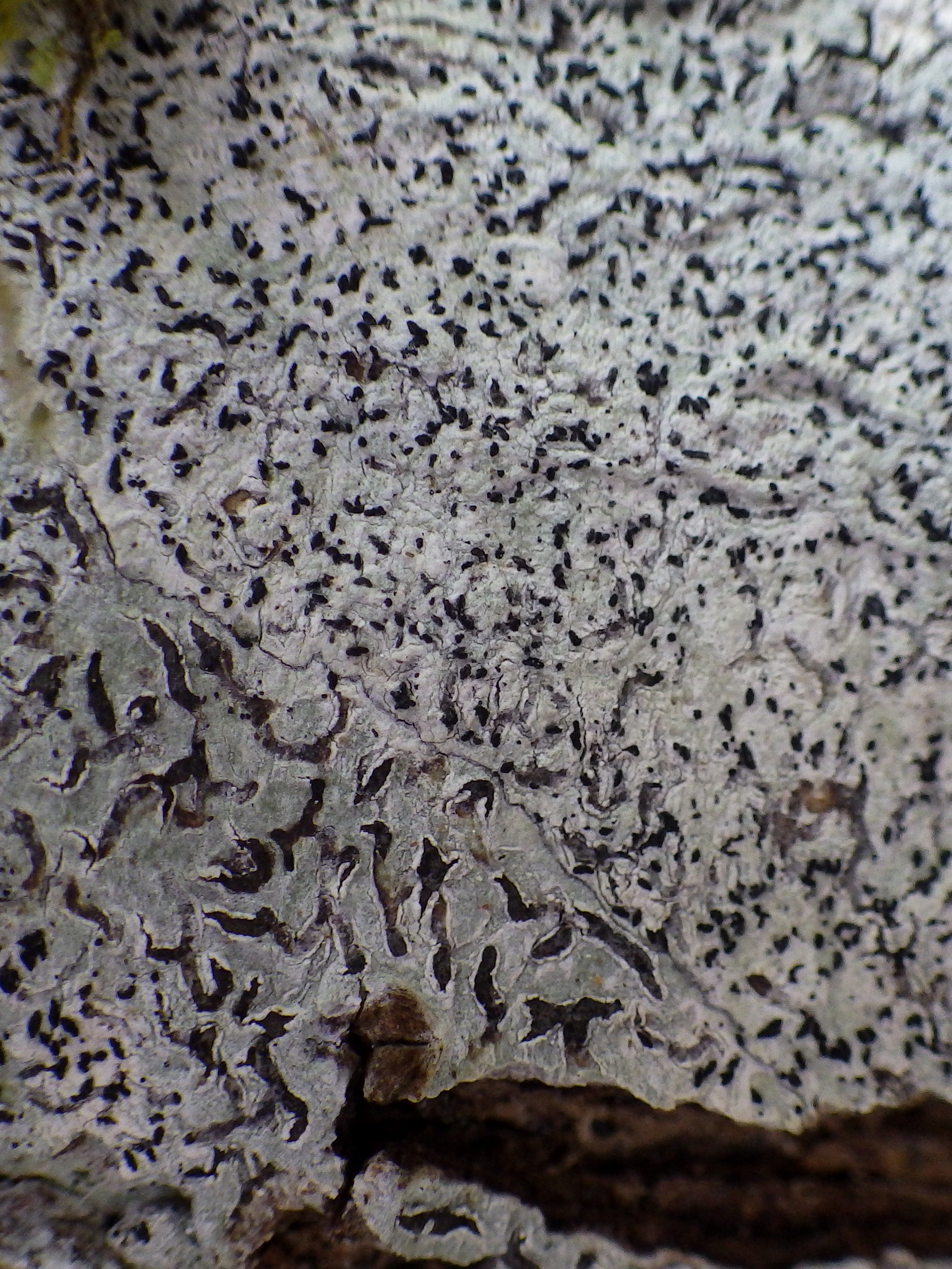
Melaspilea lentiginosa

As of October 2025, Species Fungorum (in the Catalogue of Life) accept 59 species of Melaspilea. Many names historically placed in Melaspilea have been shown to belong in Asterinales (e.g., Melaspileella, Melaspileopsis, Stictographa, Karschia) rather than Melaspilea in the strict sense.

- Melaspilea amarkantakensis S.Joseph & G.P.Sinha (2015)
- Melaspilea amota Nyl. (1867)
- Melaspilea arthonioides (A.Massal.) Nyl. (1857)
- Melaspilea atacamensis C.W.Dodge (1967)
- Melaspilea atroides Coppins (1992) – Europe
- Melaspilea bagliettoana Zahlbr. (1904)
- Melaspilea chilena C.W.Dodge (1969) – South America
- Melaspilea congregans Müll.Arg. (1891)
- Melaspilea congregantula Müll.Arg. (1895)
- Melaspilea constrictella (Stirt.) A.L.Sm. (1911)
- Melaspilea coquimbensis C.W.Dodge (1967)
- Melaspilea costaricensis (Lücking, Lizano & Chaves) Ertz & Diederich (2015)
- Melaspilea diplasiospora (Nyl.) Müll.Arg. (1887)
- Melaspilea enteroleuca (Ach.) Ertz & Diederich (2015)
- Melaspilea galligena Zhurb. & Zhdanov (2013) – Russia
- Melaspilea gemella (Eschw.) Nyl. (1867)
- Melaspilea granitophila (Th.Fr.) Coppins (1989)
- Melaspilea hyparctica K.Holm & L.Holm (1993)
- Melaspilea interjecta (Leight.) A.L.Sm. (1911)
- Melaspilea lecideopsoidea (Rehm) K.Holm & L.Holm (1986)
- Melaspilea leciographoides Vouaux (1913)
- Melaspilea lekae Brackel & Kalb (2012)
- Melaspilea lentiginosa (Lyell ex Leight.) Müll.Arg. (1887)
- Melaspilea lentiginosula (Nyl.) A.L.Sm. (1911)
- Melaspilea leucina (Müll.Arg.) Müll.Arg. (1887)
- Melaspilea mangrovei Vrijmoed, K.D.Hyde & E.B.G.Jones (1996)
- Melaspilea microcarpa (Müll.Arg.) Müll.Arg. (1887)
- Melaspilea ochrothalamia Nyl. (1865)
- Melaspilea opegraphoides Nyl. (1863)
- Melaspilea santiagensis C.W.Dodge (1969) – South America
- Melaspilea saxicola C.W.Dodge (1969) – South America
- Melaspilea stellaris Müll.Arg. (1895)
- Melaspilea sudzuhensis Makar. (1976)
- Melaspilea tucumana Flakus, Etayo & Kukwa (2014) – Bolivia
- Melaspilea urceolata (Fr.) Ertz & Diederich (2015)
- Melaspilea zerovii Makar. & Knyazheva (1974)
