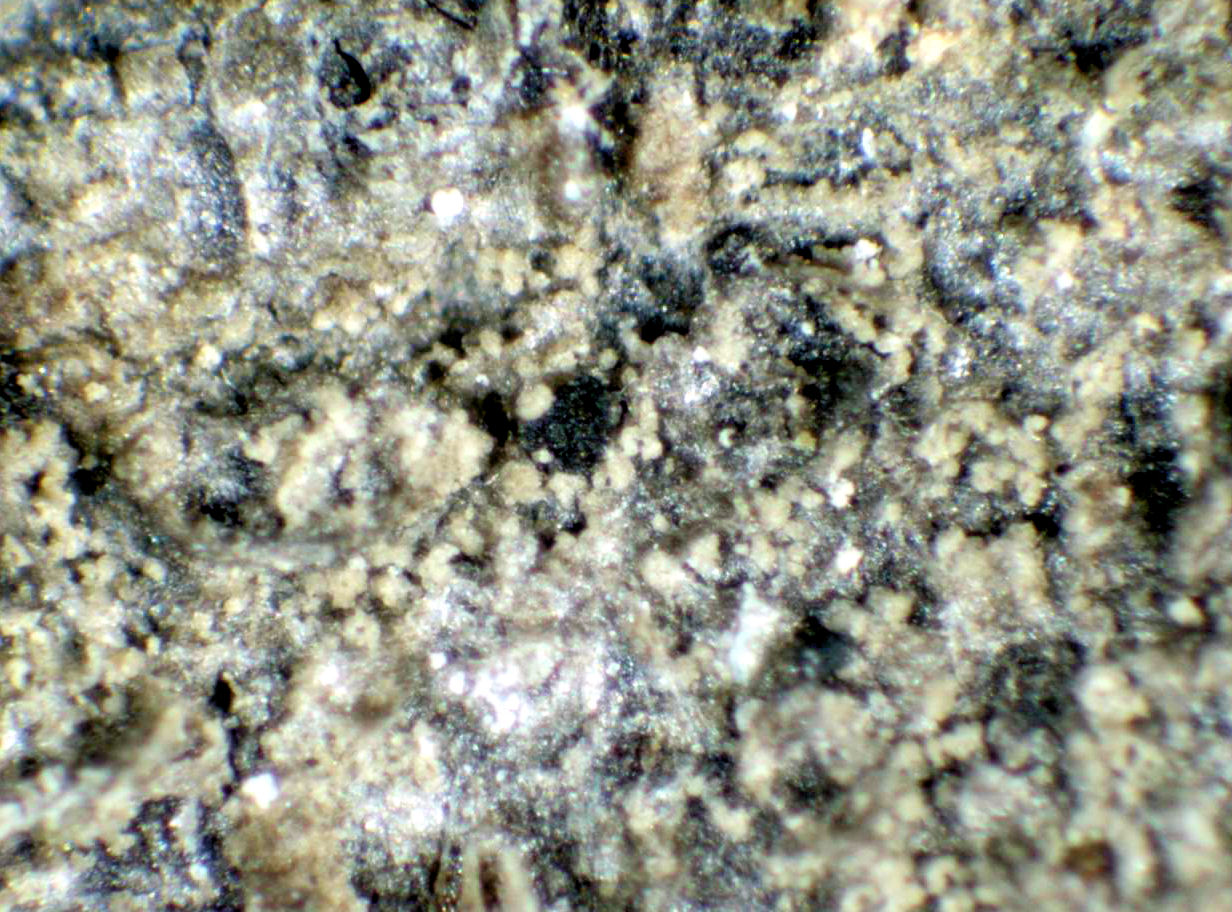
- Melaspileella proximella

Scientific classification
- Kingdom: Fungi
- Division: Ascomycota
- Class: Dothideomycetes
- Order: Asterinales
- Family: Melaspileellaceae; D.Q.Dai & K.D.Hyde (2018)
- Genus: Melaspileella (P.Karst.) Vain. (1921)
- Species: M. proximella

Binomial name
- Melaspileella proximella (Nyl.) Ertz & Diederich (2015)

Synonyms
- List: Arthonia proximella Nyl. (1861); Catillaria proximella (Nyl.) Th.Fr. (1861); Buellia proximella (Nyl.) Rabenh. (1870); Caldesia proximella (Nyl.) Trevis. (1871); Coniangium proximellum (Nyl.) Hellb. (1871); Melaspilea proximella (Nyl.) Nyl. (1873); Celidium proximellum (Nyl.) P.Karst. (1885)

= Melaspileella =

Single-species fungal genus

Melaspileella is an ascomycete genus in the family Melaspileellaceae, placed in the order Asterinales (class Dothideomycetes). The family was established in 2018 to accommodate the single genus Melaspileella, which contains only M. proximella, a species originally described in 1861. Long misclassified as a lichen and moved through various genera, molecular studies confirmed it is actually a non-lichenised saprophyte living on tree bark. The fungus is characterised by minute black fruiting bodies and distinctive ascospores bearing slender appendages that are visible when wet but disappear upon drying. Found across temperate and boreal regions of the Northern Hemisphere on both conifers and broad-leaved trees, it remains rarely encountered, likely due to its tiny size and inconspicuous appearance.

== Taxonomy ==
Melaspileellaceae was established in 2018 by Dong-Qin Dai, Kevin D. Hyde and co-authors, who used DNA sequence data to show that Melaspileella forms a distinct clade within Asterinales, sister to Hemigraphaceae, and therefore merits recognition as a separate family. Recent classification summaries treat Melaspileellaceae as containing a single genus, Melaspileella, and regard that genus as monospecific with only Melaspileella proximella accepted.

The generic name was originally introduced by Petter Karsten as a subgenus, Melaspileella (as a subdivision of Celidium), to accommodate three species: Celidium nephromiarium, C. neglectulum and C. proximellum. Edvard Vainio later raised Melaspileella to generic rank in 1921, applying it to two species that had previously been included in Melaspilea in the loose sense (M. microspilota and M. pandani) and treating M. proximella as the type species of the genus. Around the same period, other authors created combinations such as Melaspileella nephromiaria for species originally described in Arthonia and related genera, which contributed to a heterogeneous and taxonomically unstable concept of Melaspileella.

The fungus now known as Melaspileella proximella was first described by William Nylander in 1861 as Arthonia proximella, reflecting an early assumption that it was a lichenised member of Arthoniaceae. It was subsequently moved through several genera and families, at various times placed in Catillaria, Melaspilea, and Buellia, or segregated in the genus Banhegyia, which illustrates the long-standing uncertainty about its true relationships. A molecular study by Damien Ertz and Paul Diederich, published in 2015, showed that Melaspilea (in the loose sense) and related "melaspileoid" fungi belong to several unrelated lineages within Dothideomycetes and demonstrated that Melaspileella proximella is not part of Arthoniomycetes but rather belongs in Asterinales. In that work they lectotypified the genus with M. proximella, transferred Banhegyia setispora to Melaspileella as a synonym of M. proximella on morphological grounds, and moved the genus to Asterinales without assigning it to a family.

Subsequent phylogenetic analyses by Dai and co-authors confirmed that sequences of M. proximella form an independent lineage in Asterinales, leading to the formal introduction of Melaspileellaceae to accommodate this single genus. At the same time, modern treatments have not retained the other historical combinations in Melaspileella: Vainio's species M. microspilota and M. pandani are treated as former Melaspilea sensu lato species that have not been included in the current, sequence-based circumscription of the genus, while Melaspileella nephromiaria is now regarded in Species Fungorum as an alternative name for Arthonia patellulata var. nephromiaria and placed in Arthoniaceae rather than in Melaspileellaceae. As a result, recent phylogenetic and classification works consider Melaspileella to be a monotypic genus containing only M. proximella.

== Description ==
Melaspileella produces tiny, black fruiting bodies that appear as solitary, rounded stromatic ascomata on the surface of bark. The outer wall (peridium) of each ascoma consists of two layers: an external layer of thick-walled, black cells and an inner layer of lighter brown to nearly hyaline cells of a Latin type. Inside the ascomata, numerous filamentous pseudoparaphyses (sterile filaments) are present; they are hyaline and mostly unbranched, but have brownish pigmented tips around the asci. The asci are eight-spored, bitunicate (having a double wall), and broadly club-shaped (clavate) to almost spherical in shape, with a rounded apex and a short stalk (pedicel). Each ascus contains eight ascospores that are hyaline, one-septate (two-celled), with the upper cell slightly larger than the lower cell. A distinctive feature of the spores is that they bear 2–3 slender appendages (setulae) at the poles; these appendages are visible in fresh or wet spores but tend to disappear when the spore dries. No asexual reproductive stage is known for Melaspileella (the fungus is only known from its sexual morph).

== Habitat and distribution ==
Melaspileella proximella is a saprobic fungus that grows on the bark of living or dead woody plants. It does not form a lichen thallus (no photobiont is present), although it may superficially resemble a thin crust on bark (a "crustose, endophloedal" growth). This species has been recorded on the trunks and branches of a variety of trees and shrubs, including conifers like pine (Pinus) and juniper (Juniperus), as well as broad-leaved trees such as linden (Tilia). The species is interpreted as a saprobe of bark tissues rather than a pathogen of the host plant. In terms of distribution, Melaspileella proximella is known from temperate regions of the Northern Hemisphere. It has been documented in multiple parts of Europe (for example, Scandinavia and central Europe) and in eastern North America. Recent records also indicate its presence in Asia (e.g. Siberia, Russia), suggesting a broad boreal-temperate distribution across Eurasia and North America. However, it is generally considered a rarely encountered fungus, likely overlooked due to its minute size and inconspicuous appearance on bark.
