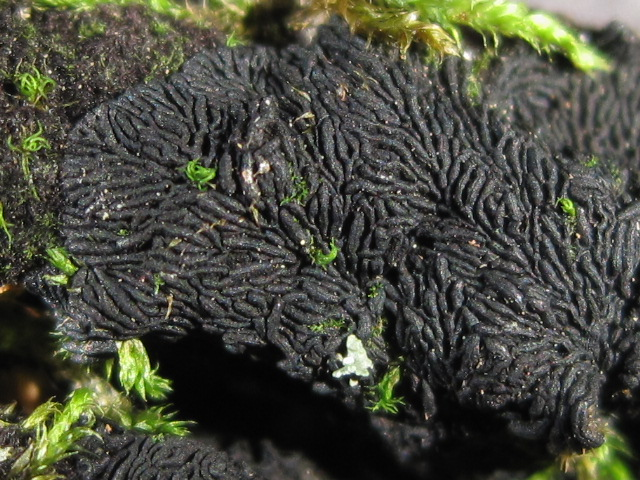
- Glonium stellatum

Scientific classification
- Kingdom: Fungi
- Division: Ascomycota
- Class: Dothideomycetes
- Order: Gloniales
- Family: Gloniaceae; E.Boehm, C.L.Schoch & Spatafora (2009)

Genera
- Cenococcum; Glonium; Psiloglonium

= Gloniaceae =

Family of fungi

The Gloniaceae are a family of fungi in the order Mytilinidiales.
