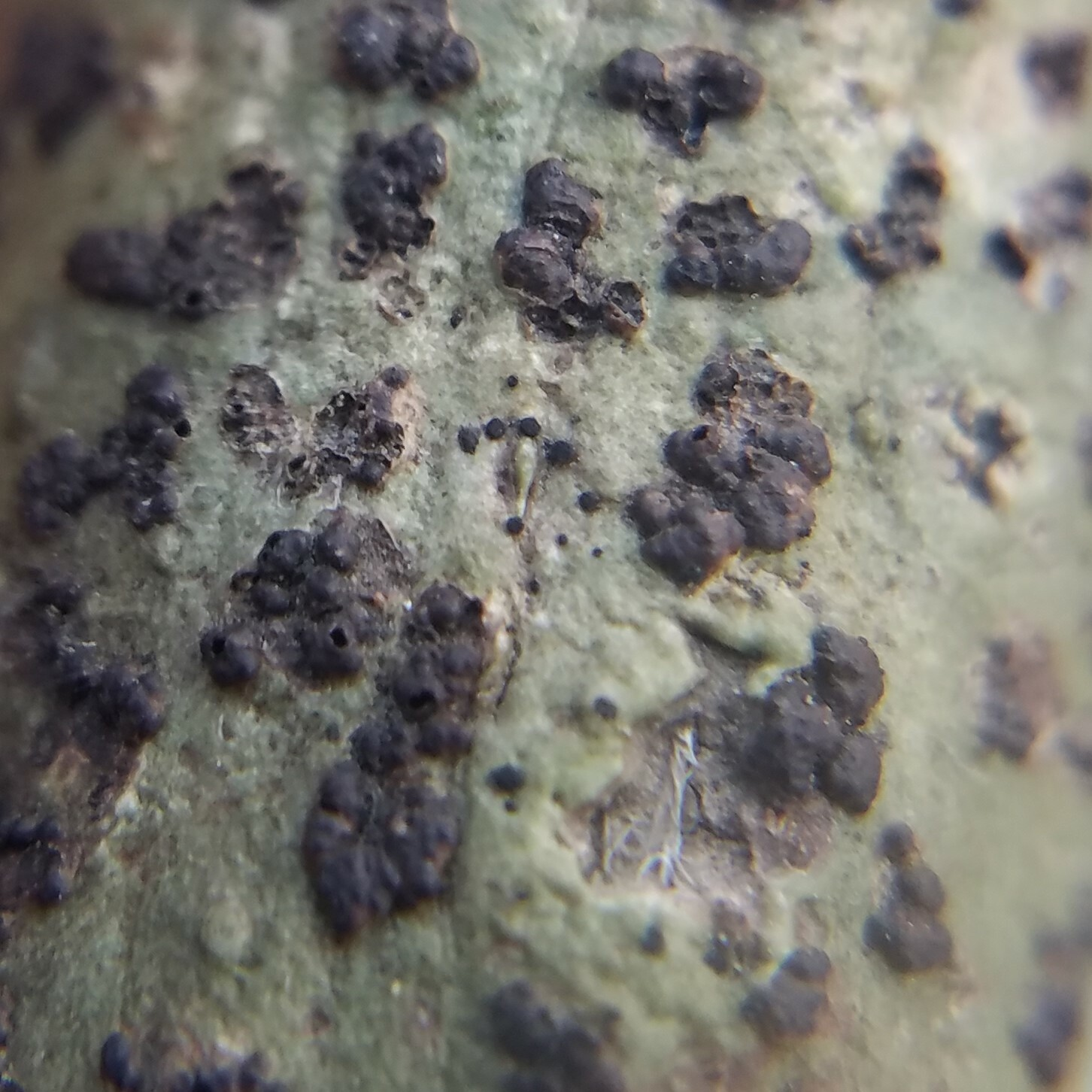
- Buelliella trypethelii

Scientific classification
- Kingdom: Fungi
- Division: Ascomycota
- Class: Dothideomycetes
- Order: Asterinales
- Family: Stictographaceae
- Genus: Buelliella; Fink (1935)

Type species
- Buelliella minimula (Tuck.) Fink (1935)

= Buelliella =

Genus of fungi

Buelliella is a genus of lichenicolous (lichen-dwelling) fungi in the family Stictographaceae. It comprises 13 thirteen species. The genus was established in 1935 by the American lichenologist Bruce Fink, who originally included seven species. These fungi are parasites that live on other lichens, producing small disc-shaped fruiting bodies that start buried in their host and later emerge at the surface.

== Taxonomy ==
The genus was originally circumscribed by the American lichenologist Bruce Fink in 1935. He included seven species in his original concept of the genus. Fink did not specify a type species for the genus; Josef Hafellner assigned B. minimula as the type in 1979.

== Description ==
Buelliella is a lichen-inhabiting (lichenicolous) genus that produces no independent thallus of its own. Its fruiting bodies (ascomata) begin as more-or-less spherical, closed structures embedded in the host; as they mature, the upper wall splits irregularly and flakes away, eventually leaving a shallow, disc-like apothecium that sits on the surface. The surrounding rim (exciple) is medium to dark brown and usually shows no reaction to the potassium hydroxide spot test (K−). The spore-bearing layer (hymenium) is either unreactive in iodine (K/I−) or stains a faint pale blue.

Within each ascoma the tissue between the asci (hamathecium) consists of paraphysoids that may branch or fuse together; their tips are slightly swollen and often tinged brown. Short, few-celled periphyses arise from the inner exciple. The asci are fissitunicate—double-walled structures that broaden like a club to a short cylinder—and have a thickened apex with a distinct ocular chamber; they do not stain in iodine and usually contain eight spores. The resulting ascospores are smooth, ellipsoidal, single-septate, pale to medium brown, and slightly constricted at the septum. No asexual stage (anamorph) has been observed for the genus.

== Species ==
As of July 2025, Species Fungorum (in the Catalogue of Life) accepts 13 species of Buelliella:

- Buelliella colombiana Etayo (2002)
- Buelliella dirinariae Diederich (1997)
- Buelliella eximia Kalb & Hafellner (1990)
- Buelliella heppiae van den Boom (2010)
- Buelliella indica Pushpi Singh & Kr.P.Singh (2019) – India
- Buelliella inops (Triebel & Rambold) Hafellner (2002)
- Buelliella lecanorae Suija & Alstrup (2004)
- Buelliella minimula (Tuck.) Fink (1935)
- Buelliella ohmurae Zhurb. & Diederich (2020) – host: Icmadophila
- Buelliella physciicola Poelt & Hafellner (1979)
- Buelliella protoparmeliopsis Etayo & Pérez-Ort. (2010) – South America
- Buelliella pusilla Hafellner (1985)
- Buelliella trypethelii (Tuck.) Fink ex Hafellner (1979)
