= Karschia (fungus) =

Scientific classification
- Kingdom: Fungi
- Division: Ascomycota
- Class: Dothideomycetes
- Order: Asterinales
- Family: Stictographaceae
- Genus: Karschia Körb. (1865)

Type species
- Karschia talcophila (Ach. ex Flot.) Körb. (1865)

Genus of fungi

Karschia is a genus of fungi in the class Dothideomycetes.

The genus name of Karschia is in honour of Anton Ferdinand Franz Karsch (1822-1892), who was a German doctor and botanist. He was in 1852, Professor of Medicine in Münster.

The genus was circumscribed by Gustav Wilhelm Körber in Parerga Lichenol. on page 459 in 1865.

== Species ==
- Karschia adnata
- Karschia agapanthi
- Karschia alpicolae
- Karschia artemisiae
- Karschia atherospermae
- Karschia brachyspora
- Karschia crassa
- Karschia crassaria
- Karschia elaeospora
- Karschia elasticae
- Karschia epimyces
- Karschia fuegiana
- Karschia globuligera
- Karschia juniperi
- Karschia laeta
- Karschia latypizae
- Karschia linitaria
- Karschia microspora
- Karschia minuta
- Karschia pertusariae
- Karschia ricasoliae
- Karschia santessonii
- Karschia tjibodensis
- Karschia talcophila
