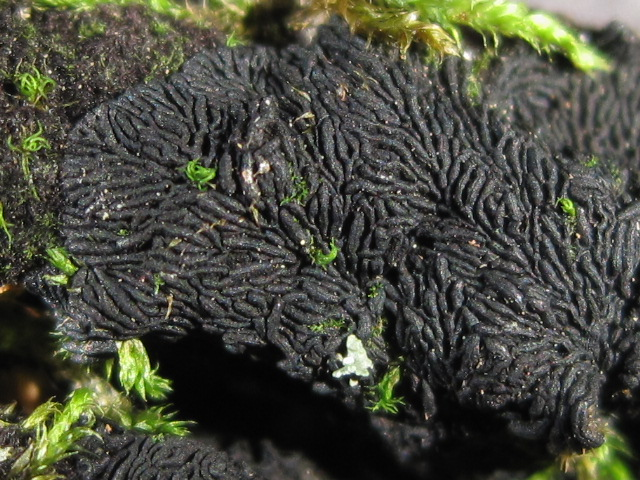
- Glonium stellatum

Scientific classification
- Domain: Eukaryota
- Kingdom: Fungi
- Division: Ascomycota
- Class: Dothideomycetes
- Subclass: Pleosporomycetidae
- Order: Mytilinidiales; E.Boehm, C.L.Schoch & Spatafora (2009)

Families
- Mytilinidiaceae; Gloniaceae

= Mytilinidiales =

Order of fungi

Mytilinidiales is an order of fungi within the class Dothideomycetes.
