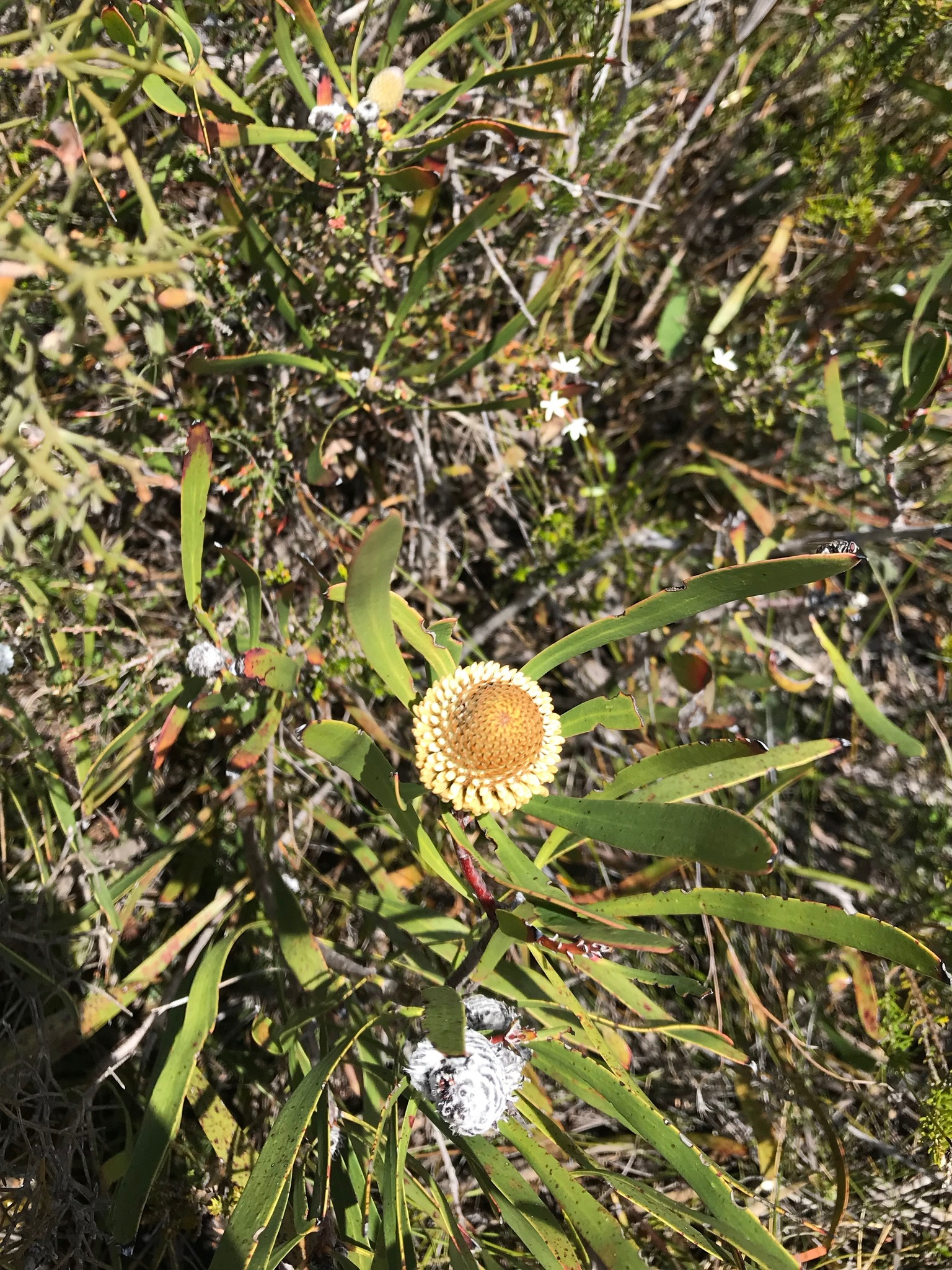
- Foliage and flowers

Scientific classification
- Kingdom: Plantae
- Clade: Tracheophytes
- Clade: Angiosperms
- Clade: Eudicots
- Order: Proteales
- Family: Proteaceae
- Genus: Isopogon
- Species: I. longifolius

Binomial name
- Isopogon longifolius R.Br.
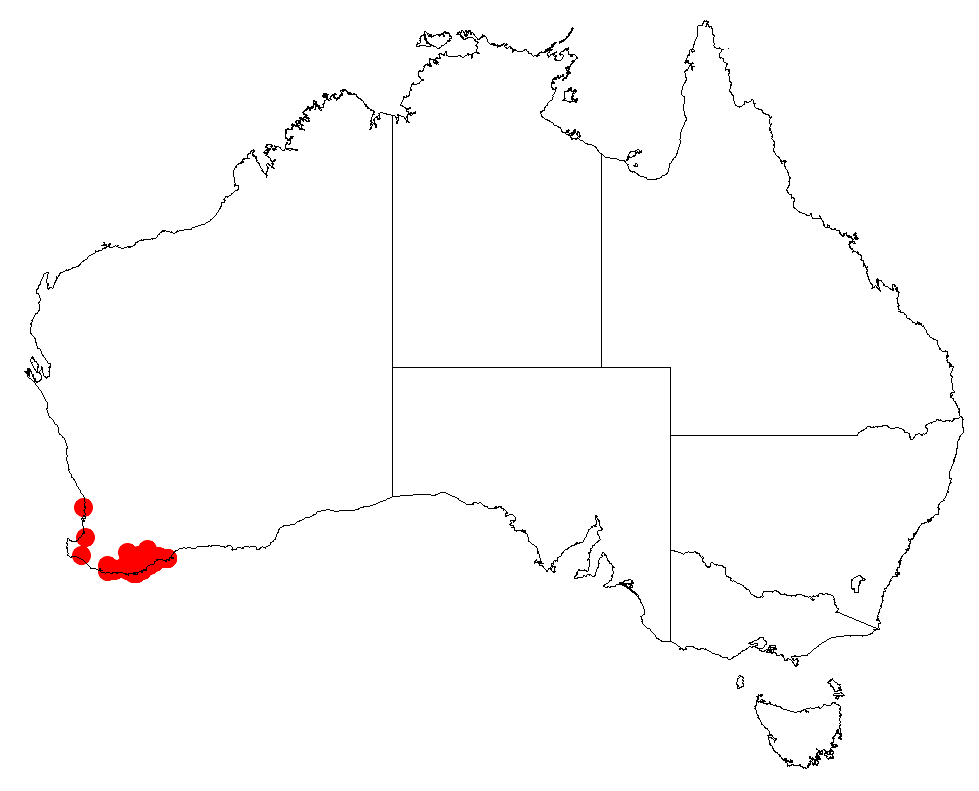
- Occurrence data from Australasian Virtual Herbarium

Synonyms
- Atylus longifolius (R.Br.) Kuntze

= Isopogon longifolius =

Species of shrub endemic to Western Australia

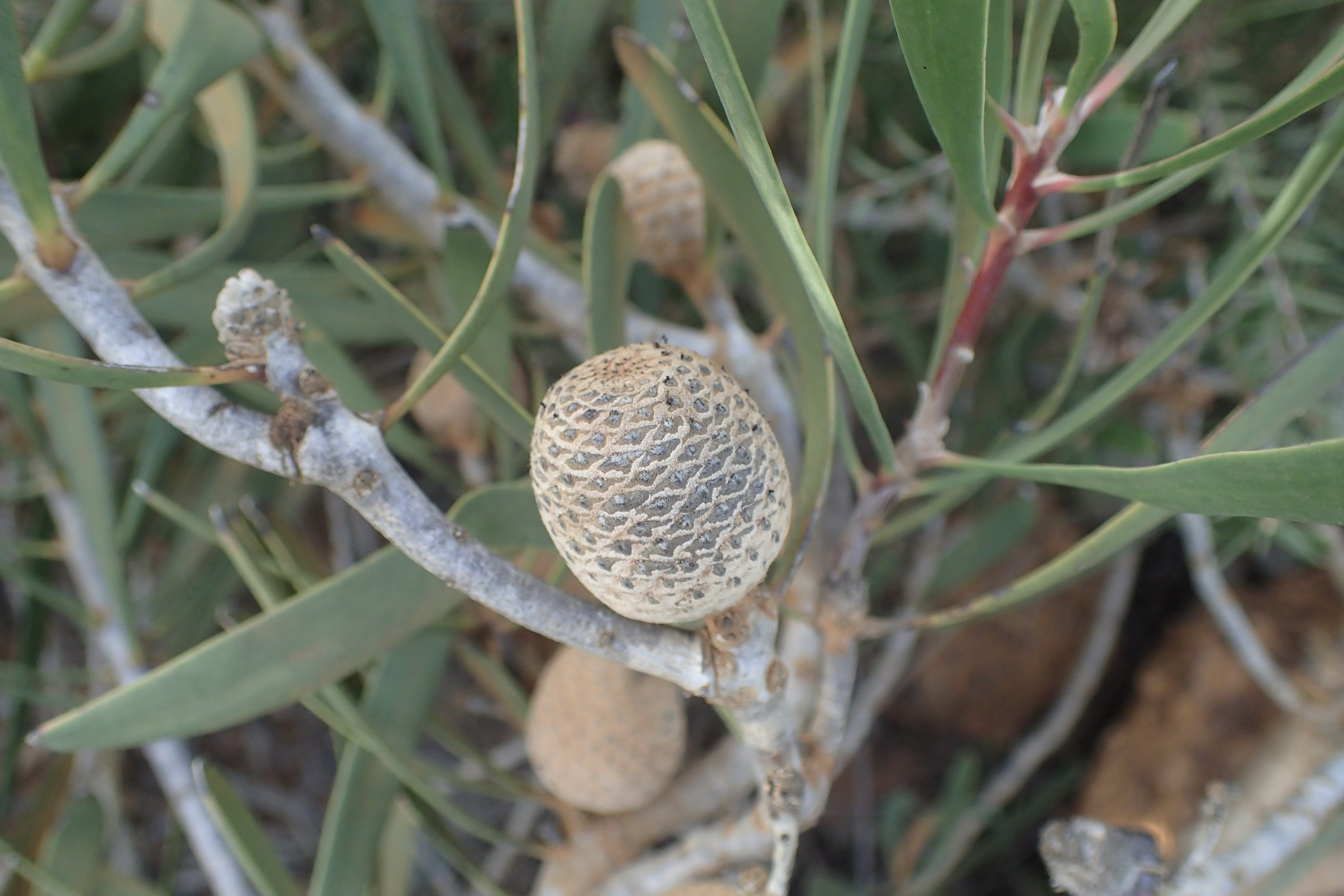
Fruit

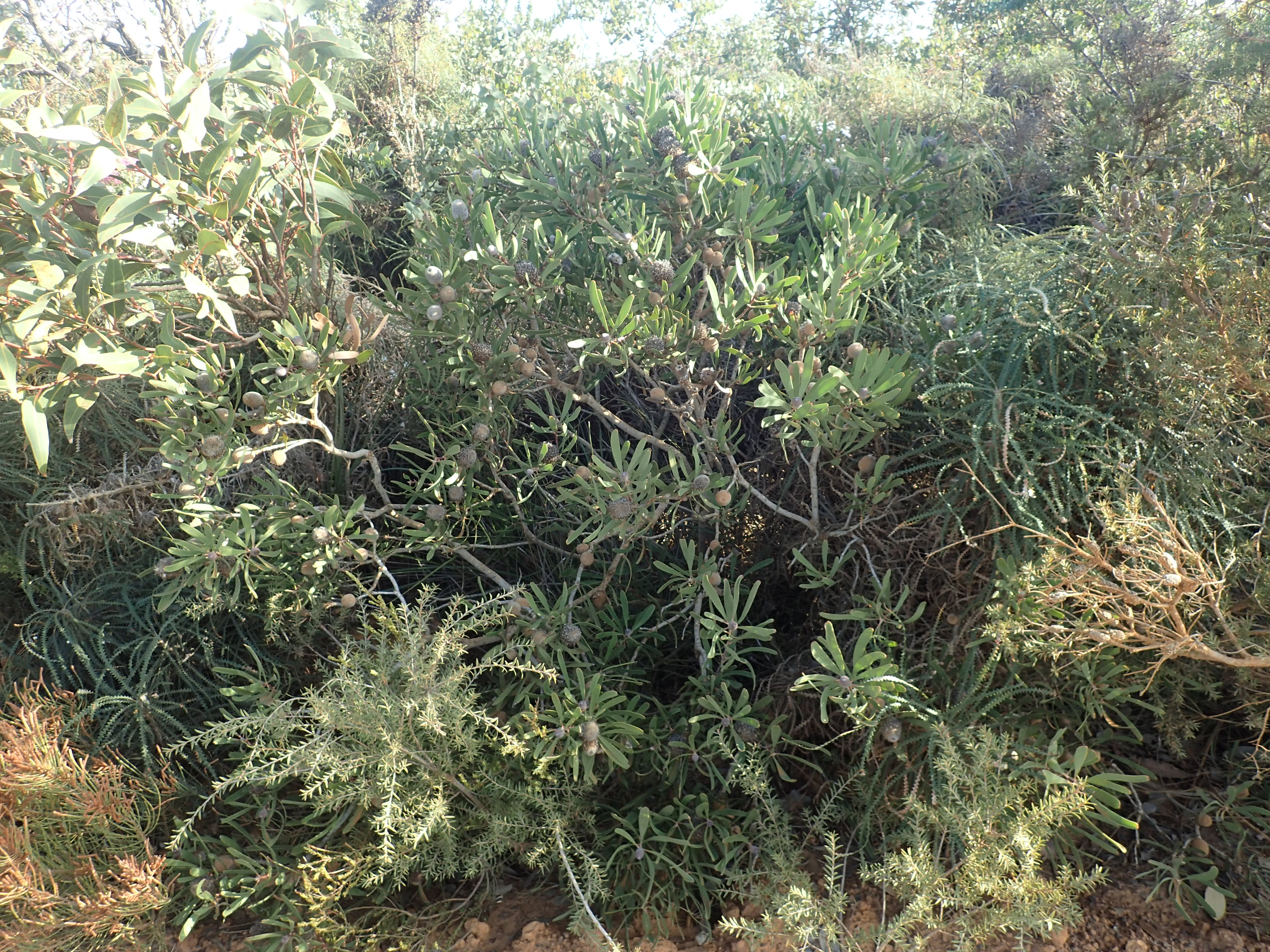
Habit near Cape Riche

Isopogon longifolius is a species of flowering plant in the family Proteaceae and is endemic to the southwest of Western Australia. It is a shrub with simple, linear, or deeply divided leaves and sessile, spherical heads of silky-hairy, yellow flowers and spherical to oval cone.

== Description ==
Isopogon longifolius is a shrub that typically grows to a height of up to 2.5 m (8 ft 2 in), its branchlets brownish to grey and hairy when young. The leaves are simple, linear to narrowly egg-shaped with the narrower end towards the base, sometimes deeply divided with two or three lobes, about 155 mm (6.1 in) long on a petiole about 30 mm (1.2 in) long. The flowers are borne in a spherical, sessile cluster up to about 25 mm (0.98 in) in diameter, each flower up to 15 mm (0.59 in) long, yellow and silky-hairy with a spindle-shaped pollen presenter up to 3.5 mm (0.14 in) long. Flowering occurs from November to January, and the fruit is a shaggy-hairy nut 3–4 mm (0.12–0.16 in) long, held in a more or less spherical to oval cone up to 26 mm (1.0 in) in diameter.

== Taxonomy ==
Isopogon longifolius was first formally described by botanist Robert Brown in Transactions of the Linnean Society of London in 1810.

In 1891, German botanist Otto Kuntze published Revisio generum plantarum, his response to what he perceived as a lack of method in existing nomenclatural practice. Because Isopogon was based on Isopogon anemonifolius, and that species had already been placed by Richard Salisbury in the segregate genus Atylus in 1807, Kuntze revived the latter genus on the grounds of priority, and made the new combination Atylus longifolius for this species. However, Kuntze's revisionary program was not accepted by the majority of botanists. Ultimately, the genus Isopogon was nomenclaturally conserved over Atylus by the International Botanical Congress of 1905.

== Distribution and habitat ==
This species often grows on sandstone hills in heath or shrubland and is found on the Stirling Range, the Porongurup Range, near Albany, Walpole and Cranbrook and on the coast towards Bremer Bay.

== Conservation status ==
Isopogon longifolius is listed as "not threatened" by the Western Australian Government Department of Biodiversity, Conservation and Attractions.
