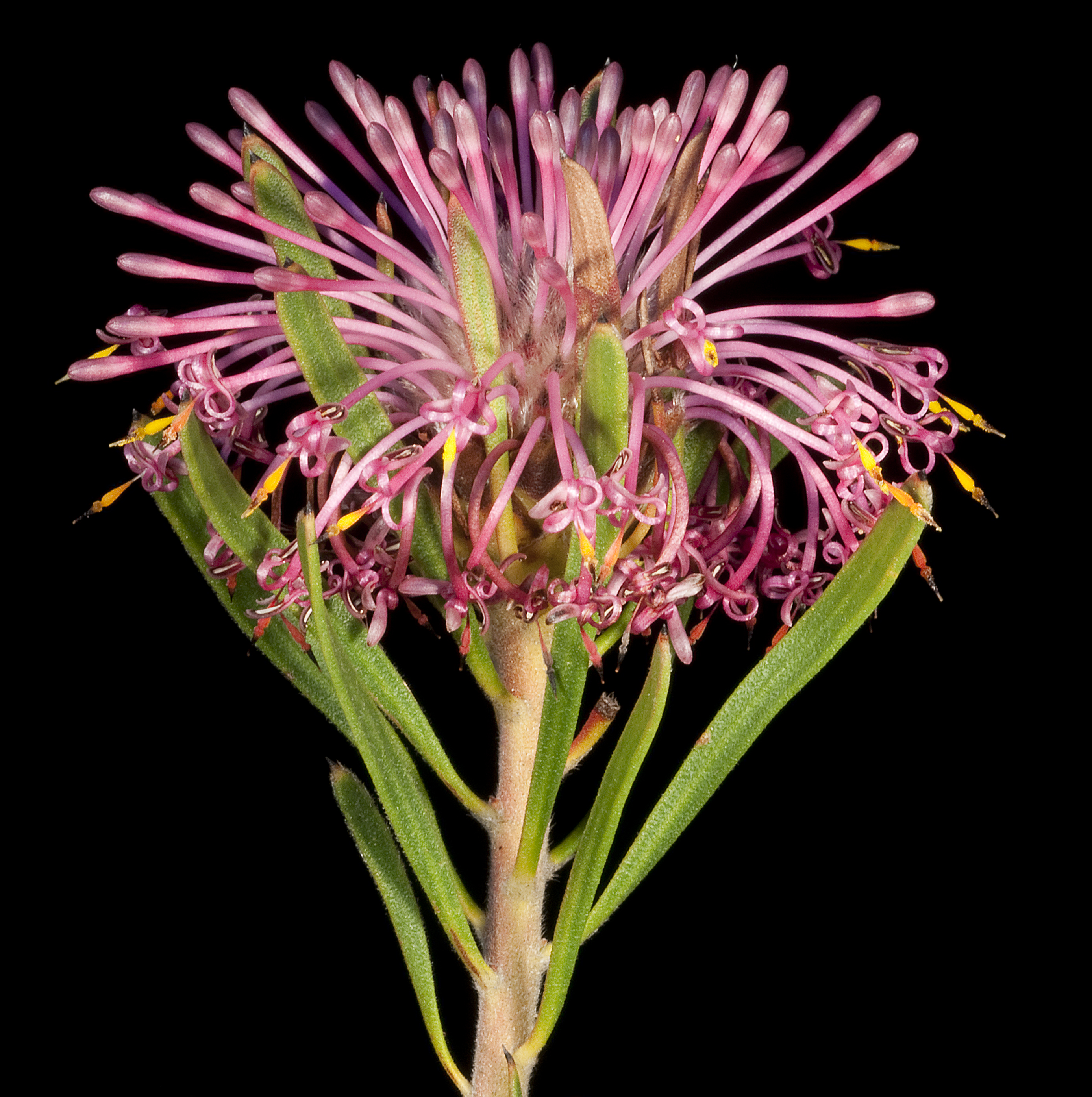

Scientific classification
- Kingdom: Plantae
- Clade: Tracheophytes
- Clade: Angiosperms
- Clade: Eudicots
- Order: Proteales
- Family: Proteaceae
- Genus: Isopogon
- Species: I. linearis

Binomial name
- Isopogon linearis Meisn.
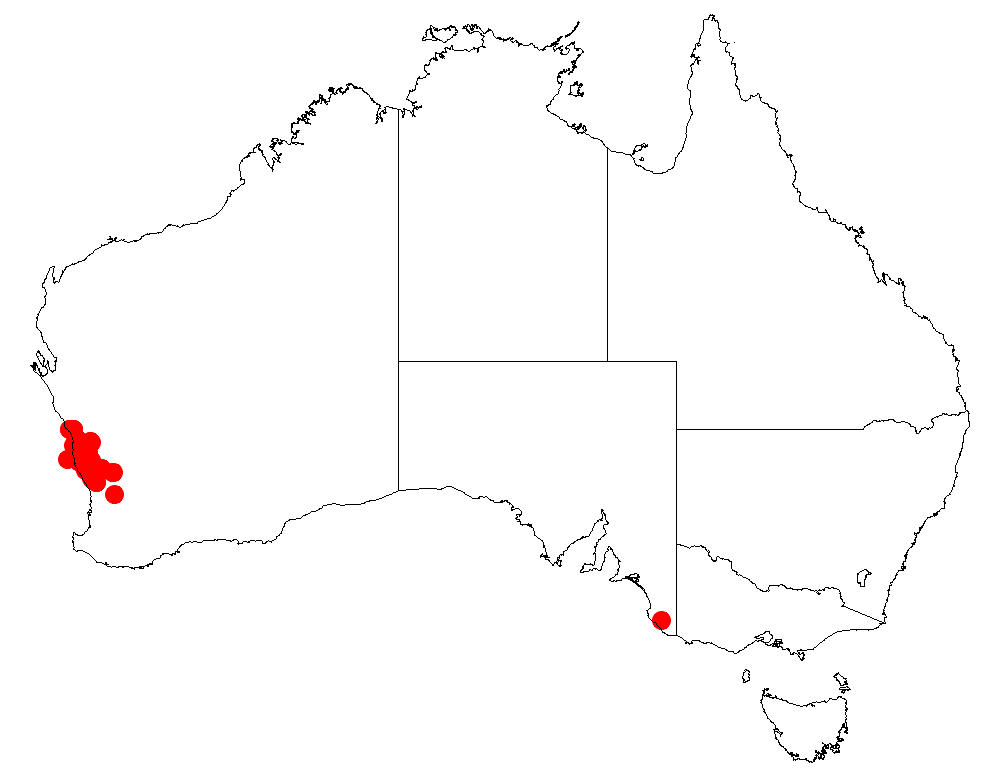
- Occurrence data from Australasian Virtual Herbarium

Synonyms
- Atylus linearis (Meisn.) Kuntze

= Isopogon linearis =

Species of shrub endemic to Western Australia

Isopogon linearis is a small shrub in the family Proteaceae that is endemic to the southwest of Western Australia.

== Description ==
Isopogon linearis is a small shrub, 0.5–1.5 m (1.6–4.9 ft) high, with branchlets covered in straight hairs. The hairy, flat leaves are alternate, and 25–90 mm (1.0–3.5 in) long, and 2–7 mm wide. They are roughly the same width for their entire length, and have smooth edges. The pink inflorescence is not sticky. The hairy perianth 20–24 mm long. The pistil is 20–25 mm long and the hairy pollen presenter is not spindle-shaped and is 3–4.5 mm long. The cone has deciduous scales, and is 23–25 mm long. The plant flowers in August, September or October.

== Taxonomy ==
The species was first formally described by botanist Carl Meissner in Hooker's Journal of Botany and Kew Garden Miscellany in 1855. In 1891, German botanist Otto Kuntze published Revisio generum plantarum, his response to what he perceived as a lack of method in existing nomenclatural practice. Because Isopogon was based on Isopogon anemonifolius, and that species had already been placed by Richard Salisbury in the segregate genus Atylus in 1807, Kuntze revived the latter genus on the grounds of priority, and made the new combination Atylus linearis for this species. However, Kuntze's revisionary program was not accepted by the majority of botanists. Ultimately, the genus Isopogon was nomenclaturally conserved over Atylus by the International Botanical Congress of 1905.

The accepted description for Isopogon linearis is that of Foreman (1995) in Flora of Australia.
