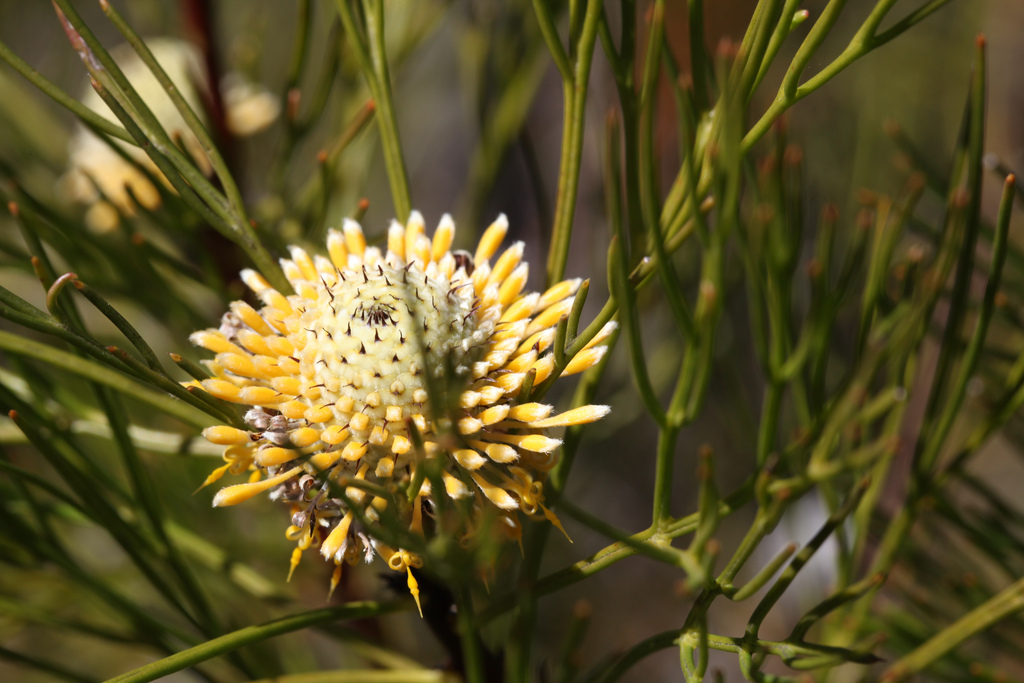
- Flowers emerging from base of cone

Scientific classification
- Kingdom: Plantae
- Clade: Tracheophytes
- Clade: Angiosperms
- Clade: Eudicots
- Order: Proteales
- Family: Proteaceae
- Genus: Isopogon
- Species: I. anethifolius

Binomial name
- Isopogon anethifolius Salisb. (Knight)
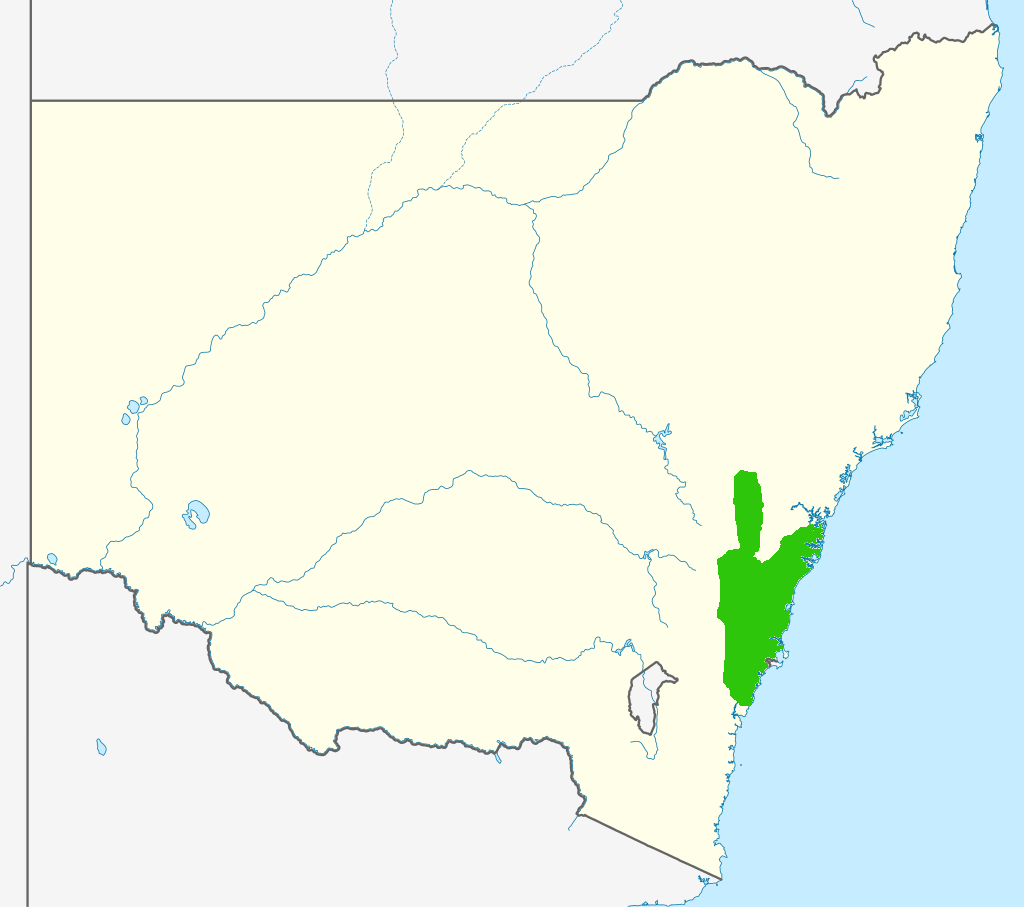
- Range in New South Wales (in green)

Synonyms
- List: Atylus anethifolius (Salisb.) Kuntze; Isopogon anethifolius (Salisb.) R.Br. isonym; Isopogon confertus Gand.; Isopogon eriophorus Gand.; Isopogon globosus Gand.; Isopogon virgatulus McGill. orth. var.; Isopogon virgulatus Gand.; Protea anethifolia Salisb.; Protea furcellata Sm. ex Meisn. nom. inval., pro syn.; Protea rangiferina Meisn.

= Isopogon anethifolius =

Species of shrub native to Australia

Isopogon anethifolius, commonly known as narrow-leaf drumsticks or narrow-leafed drumsticks, is a shrub in the family Proteaceae. The species is found only in coastal areas near Sydney in New South Wales, and to the immediate west. It occurs naturally in woodland, open forest and heathland on sandstone soils. An upright shrub, it can reach to 3 m (9.8 ft) in height, with terete leaves that are divided and narrow. The yellow flowers appear in the Spring, from September to December, and are prominently displayed. They are followed by round grey cones, which give the plant its common name of drumsticks. The small hairy seeds are found in the old flower parts.

Isopogon anethifolius regenerates after bushfire by resprouting from its woody base, known as a lignotuber, as well as from seed. It was described by Richard Salisbury in 1796, and was first grown in the United Kingdom the same year. One of the easiest members of the genus Isopogon to grow in cultivation, I. anethifolius grows readily in the garden if located in a sunny or part-shaded spot with sandy soil and good drainage.

== Description ==
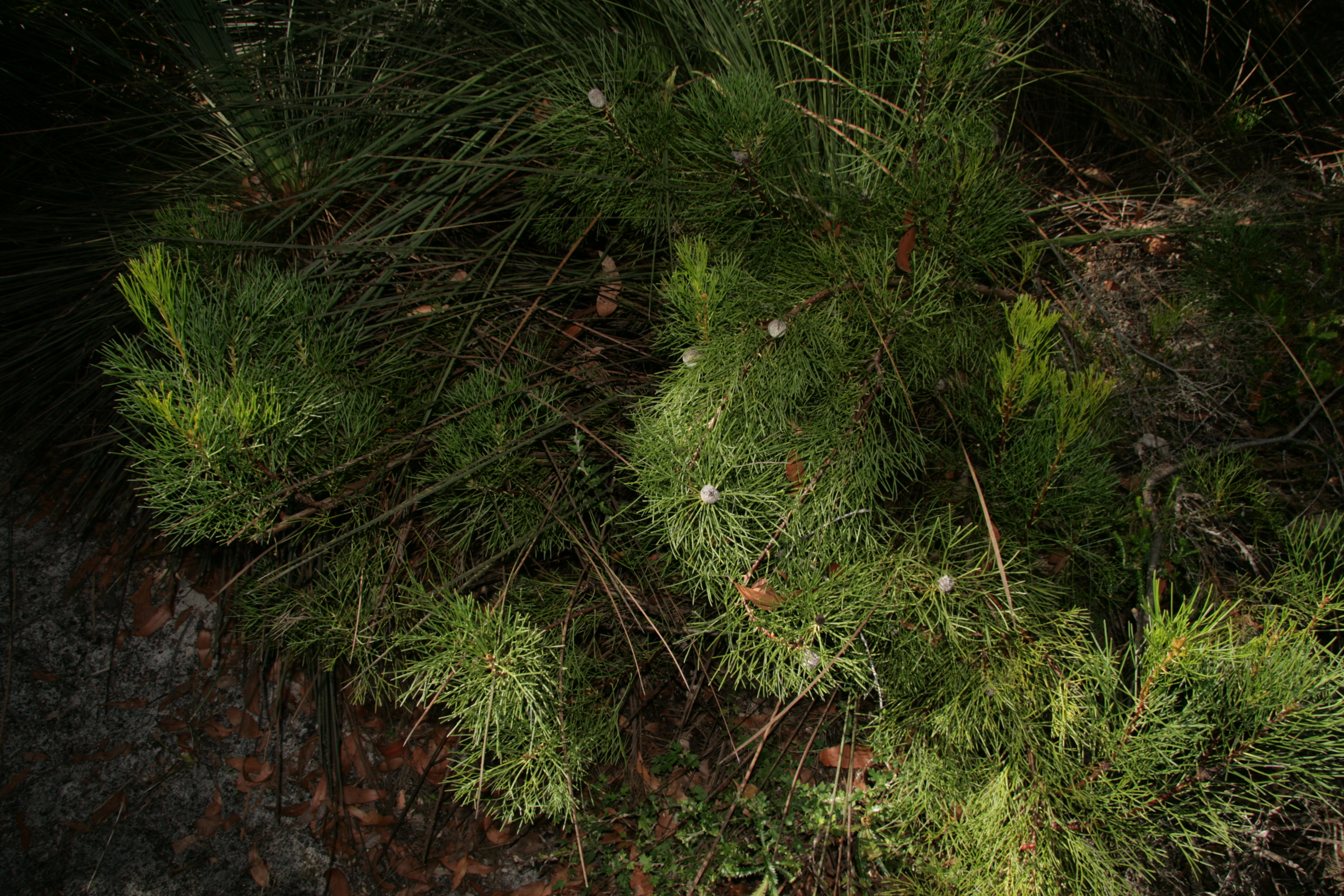
Habitat (Botany Bay National Park)

Isopogon anethifolius is a shrub usually between 1 and 3 m (3 and 10 ft) high with an upright habit (tall and thin with mostly vertical stems). It generally grows taller in more sheltered areas such as woodlands, and shorter in more exposed areas. The stems are reddish in colour, and new growth in winter is tinged with reddish and tan tones. The leaves are terete (round in cross section) and less than 1 mm (1/25 in) in diameter. They branch once or twice in their 16 cm (6 1/4 in) length. The globular yellow flowerheads, known as inflorescences, appear at the ends of branches in spring and early summer (September to December), though occasionally at other times of year. These are up to 4 cm (1 1/2 in) in diameter. The individual flowers arise out of the central woody globe in a spiral pattern, and are around 1.2 cm (1/2 in) long. They are straight stalkless structures that originate from a scale on the globe, composed of a tubular structure known as the perianth, which envelopes the flower's sexual organs. The perianth splits into four segments, revealing a thin delicate style tipped with the stigma. At the ends of the four perianth segments are the male pollen-bearing structures known as anthers. Arranged in a spiral pattern, the flowers open from the outer/bottom of the flowerhead inwards. The egg-shaped grey cones are revealed as the old flower parts fall away, and are up to 2.5 cm (0.98 in) in diameter. The seed-bearing nuts are small—up to 4 mm (3/16 in) across—and lined with hairs. The seed weighs around 4 mg (0.00014 oz).

The terete leaves readily distinguish Isopogon anethifolius from other members of the genus, which have flat leaves and are greater than 1 mm (1/25 in) across. On a microscopic level, the supporting ground tissue of I. anethifolius differs from some of its genus by its irregular misshapen sclereids (thick-walled cells that make up part of the ground tissue) and contorted cell body.

== Taxonomy ==
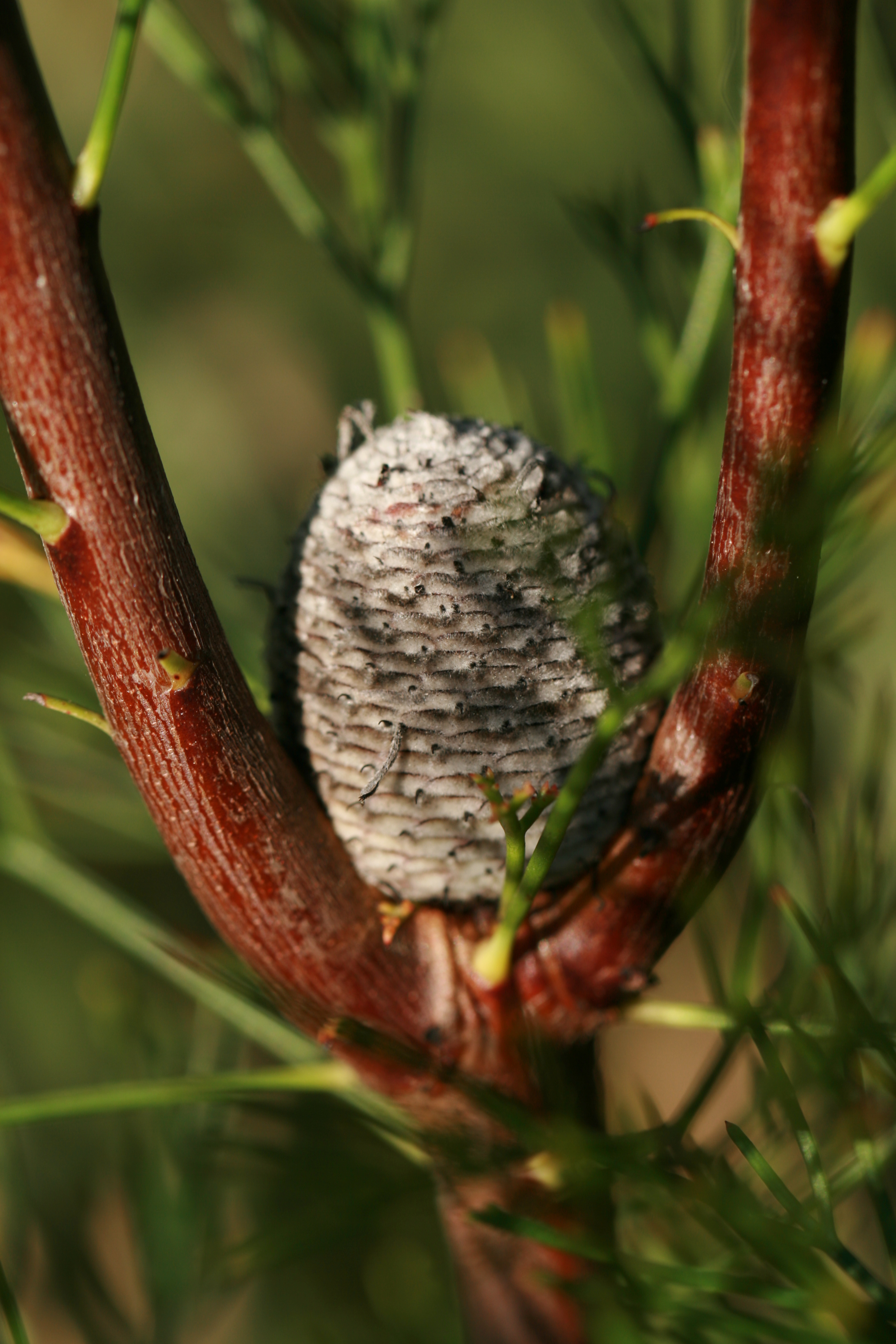
Cone persisting after the flowers have died

Isopogon anethifolius was among the plants collected by English botanist Joseph Banks and Swedish naturalist Daniel Solander on 5 May 1770 at Botany Bay during the first voyage of Captain James Cook. A drawing by Scottish artist Sydney Parkinson was the source for a subsequent painting by James Britten, published in 1905. Solander coined the (unpublished) binomial name Leucadendron serraria in Banks' Florilegium. English botanist Richard Salisbury described the species in 1796 as Protea anethifolia, from a specimen collected in Port Jackson (Sydney). The species name is derived from the Latin words anethum "dill" and folium "leaf", from the resemblance of its leaves to those of the herb. The common name is variously written as narrowleaf-, narrow-leaf-, or narrow-leafed drumsticks. The common name drumsticks is derived from the globular cones of the members of the genus.

In 1799, the Spanish botanist Antonio José Cavanilles described Protea acufera, later identified as a synonym by Salisbury and Robert Brown. I. anethifolius gained its current name in 1809 when it was redescribed as the dill-leaved isopogon (Isopogon anethifolius) by English plantsman Joseph Knight in his controversial work On the cultivation of the plants belonging to the natural order of Proteeae. Robert Brown had written of the genus Isopogon but Knight had hurried out his work before Brown's. Brown's description appeared in his paper On the natural order of plants called Proteaceae in the Transactions of the Linnean Society in 1810.

French naturalist Michel Gandoger described four taxa in 1919 that he regarded as similar to (but distinct from) I. anethifolius. I. confertus was a plant from Rylstone on the Central Tablelands, which he distinguished by its crowded leaves that were 7–8 cm (2 3/4–3 1/4 in) long. I. eriophorus was a plant with more scattered leaves that were 12–14 cm (4 3/4–5 1/2 in) long. He described I. globosus from the Port Jackson district on the basis of round (rather than oval) infructescences (cones), and I. virgatulus from Western Australia. All four were subsequently synonymised with I. anethifolius. Gandoger described 212 taxa of Australian plants, almost all of which turned out to be species already described.

The 1891 publication Revisio generum plantarum was German botanist Otto Kuntze's response to what he perceived as poor method in existing nomenclatural practice. Because Isopogon was based on Isopogon anemonifolius, and that species had already been placed by Salisbury in the segregate genus Atylus in 1807, Kuntze revived the latter genus on the grounds of priority, and made the new combination Atylus anethifolius. However, Kuntze's revisionary program was not accepted by the majority of botanists. Ultimately, the genus Isopogon was nomenclaturally conserved over Atylus by the International Botanical Congress of 1905.

Like all species in the genus Isopogon, I. anethifolius has 13 haploid chromosomes.

== Distribution and habitat ==
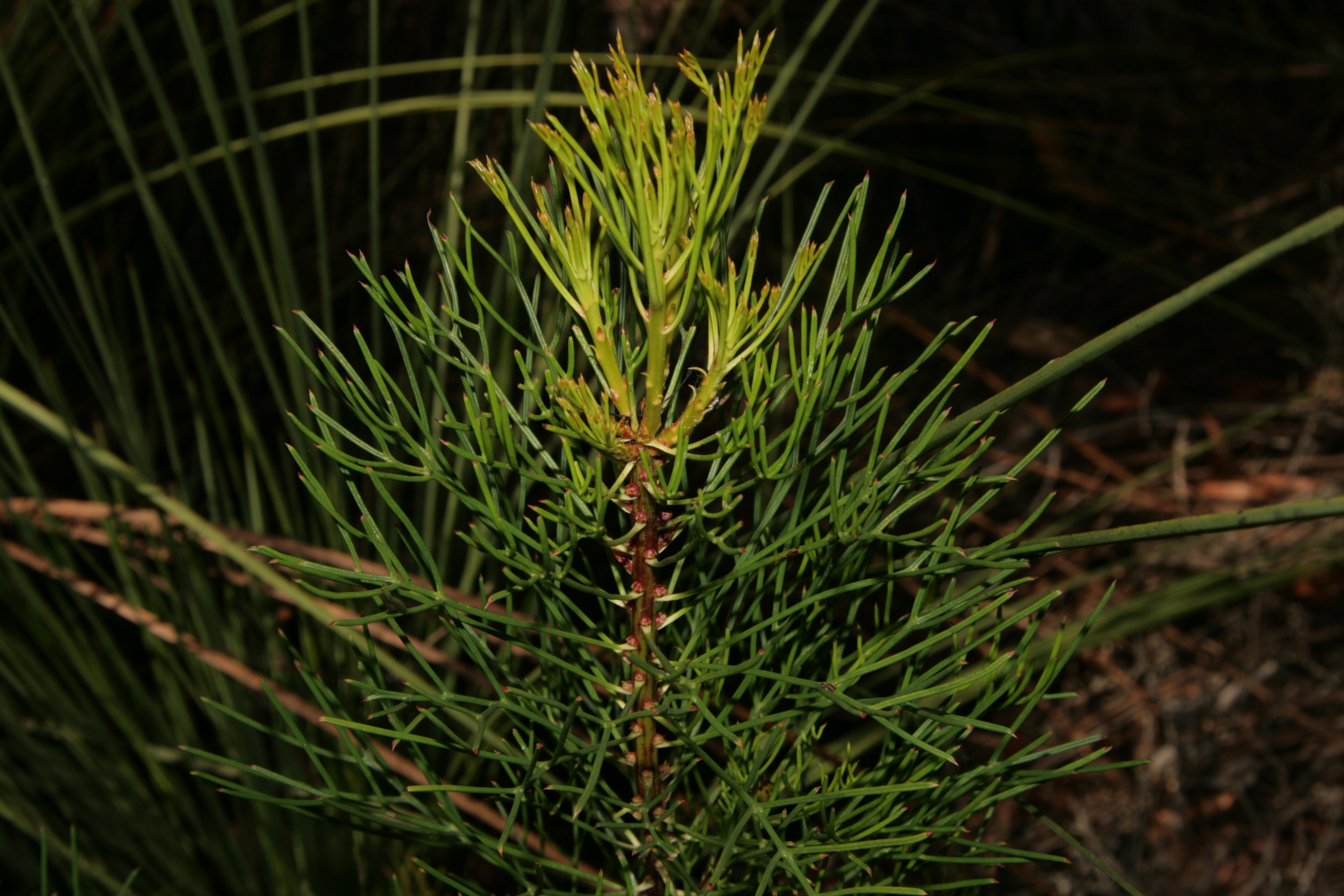
Closeup of foliage and new growth, Botany Bay National Park

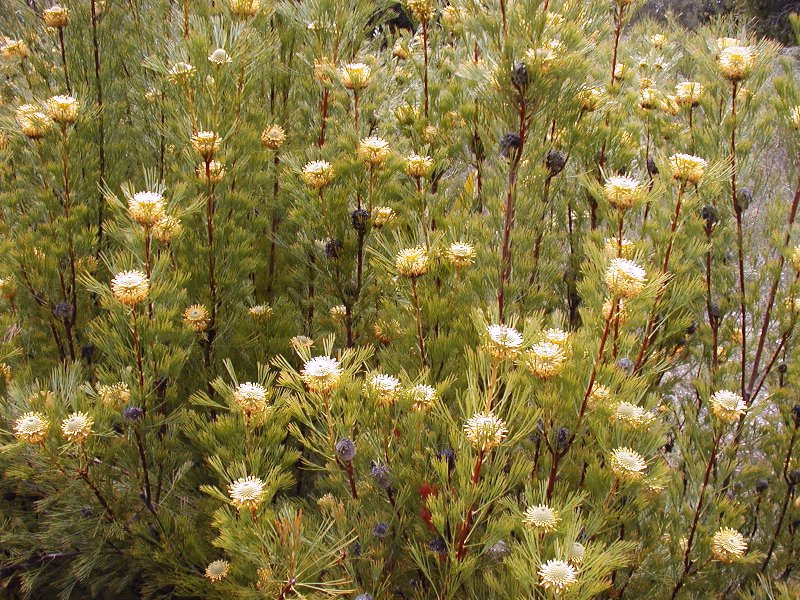
In cultivation at Maranoa Gardens in Balwyn

Isopogon anethifolius is found only in New South Wales, where it occurs in the Sydney Basin and surrounds, from Braidwood northwards to Mount Coricudgy in Wollemi National Park. The annual rainfall in these areas ranges from 900 to 1,600 mm (35 to 63 in). The species occurs naturally from sea level to 1,200 m (3,900 ft) altitude and is found on sandstone in heathland and dry sclerophyll woodland. Typical trees it is associated with include the scribbly gums Eucalyptus haemastoma and E. sclerophylla and silvertop ash (E. sieberi), open forest plants such as soft geebung (Persoonia mollis), and heathland plants such as heath banksia (Banksia ericifolia), dwarf she-oak (Allocasuarina nana) and Wingello grevillea (Grevillea molyneuxii).

== Ecology ==
Isopogon anethifolius resprouts from its woody base, known as a lignotuber, after bushfire. It is also serotinous—the seeds are held on the plant as a canopy-based seedbank and are released after fire. These then fall directly to the ground or are blown a short distance by wind. Plants resprouting from the lignotuber can flower in around two and a half years, while seedlings take around three and a half years.

Leaf spotting is caused by the fungus Vizella. Flower buds may be damaged by weevils.

== Cultivation ==
Isopogon anethifolius was first cultivated in the United Kingdom in 1796. Along with Isopogon dawsonii, it is the easiest member of the genus to grow. The fine foliage, red stems, bright yellow flowers in spring and distinctive drumsticks afterwards make I. anethifolius an appealing garden plant. It has potential as a screening plant (its dense foliage can be used for privacy). It prefers acidic soil with extra water, though it does not tolerate waterlogging. A part-shaded position is the preferred location, though I. anethifolius grows readily in full sun. Plants can withstand frosts to −8 °C (20 °F). Fertiliser applied in spring assists growth. Young plants can grow long stems that eventually droop, and respond well to pruning. The species can be propagated by cuttings or seeds, which germinate after 30 to 60 days. Flowering can take several years from seed. Western Australian Isopogon species including I. cuneatus and I. latifolius have been grafted onto rootstocks of this species. The flowers, cones and foliage are used in the cut-flower industry.
