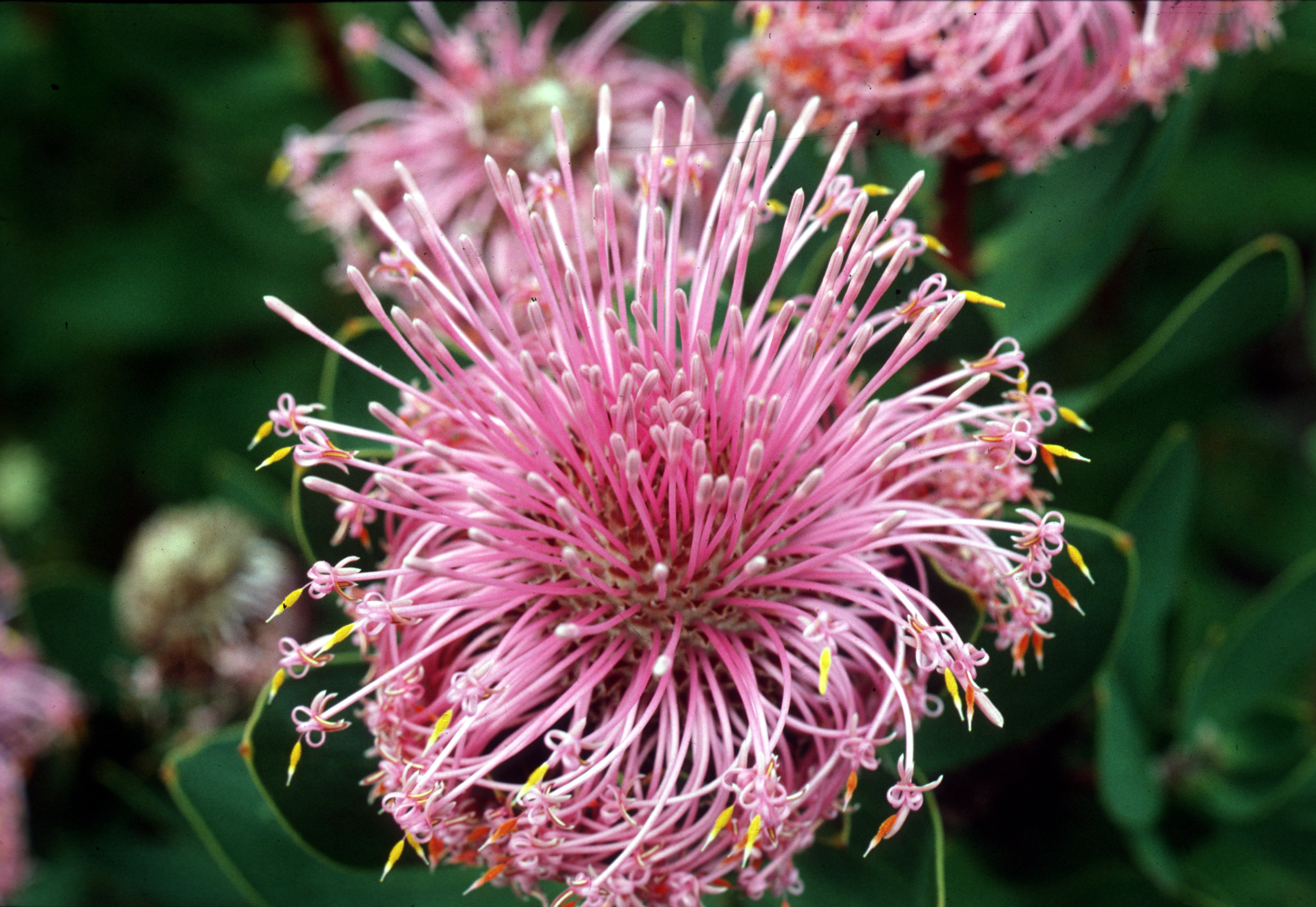

Conservation status
- Priority Four — Rare Taxa (DEC)

Scientific classification
- Kingdom: Plantae
- Clade: Tracheophytes
- Clade: Angiosperms
- Clade: Eudicots
- Order: Proteales
- Family: Proteaceae
- Genus: Isopogon
- Species: I. latifolius

Binomial name
- Isopogon latifolius R.Br.
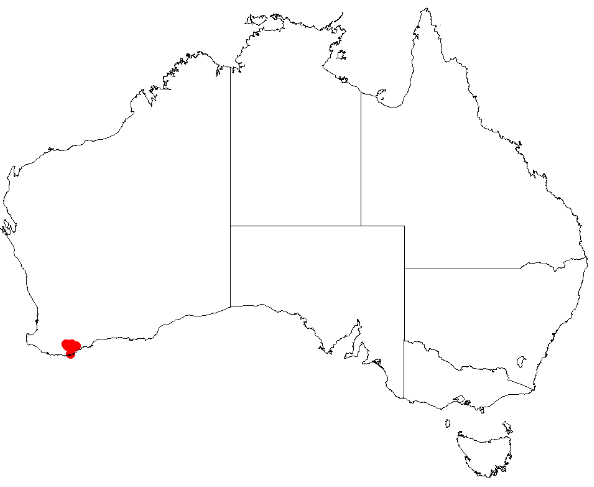
- Occurrence data from Australasian Virtual Herbarium

Synonyms
- Atylus latifolius (R.Br.) Kuntze; Isopogon protea Meisn.

= Isopogon latifolius =

Species of shrub endemic to Western Australia

Isopogon latifolius is a shrub of the family Proteaceae that is endemic to the southwest botanical province of Western Australia.

== Description ==
Isopogon latifolius grows as a woody shrub with an erect habit to 3 m (10 ft) high. The new growth is covered in fine hairs. The thick narrow leaves are 4–14 cm (1.6–5.5 in) long and obovate to oval in shape. They are glabrous (smooth) with faint veins and end in a sharp point (apex), Flowering takes place between September and December, the showy pink flower heads, known as inflorescences, appear at the ends of branches above the foliage. They are up to 8 cm in diameter.

== Taxonomy ==
The species was first formally described by botanist Robert Brown in 1830, based on material collected by William Baxter at King George's Sound. The specific epithet is derived from the Latin words latus "wide" and folium "leaf". In 1891, German botanist Otto Kuntze published Revisio generum plantarum, his response to what he perceived as a lack of method in existing nomenclatural practice. Because Isopogon was based on Isopogon anemonifolius, and that species had already been placed by Richard Salisbury in the segregate genus Atylus in 1807, Kuntze revived the latter genus on the grounds of priority, and made the new combination Atylus latifolius for this species. However, Kuntze's revisionary program was not accepted by the majority of botanists. Ultimately, the genus Isopogon was nomenclaturally conserved over Atylus by the International Botanical Congress of 1905.

== Distribution and habitat ==
Isopogon latifolius is found from Albany and the Stirling Range eastwards to the vicinity of Cheyne Bay. It grows on hilltops and stony outcrops and slopes, in association with sandstone, quartzite and schist. It grows in heath, scrub, or low woodland.

== Ecology ==
This plant is extremely sensitive to dieback from Phytophthora cinnamomi and is at risk of extinction from it in the wild.

I. latifolius can take over five years to flower from seed, meaning it can be locally eradicated by too-frequent fire intervals.

== Cultivation ==
The showiest of the isopogons, I. latifolius can be grown in regions with low humidity and in positions with good drainage, but will die readily if these conditions cannot be met. It has been grafted successfully onto Isopogon anethifolius. I. latifolius is used in the cut flower industry.
