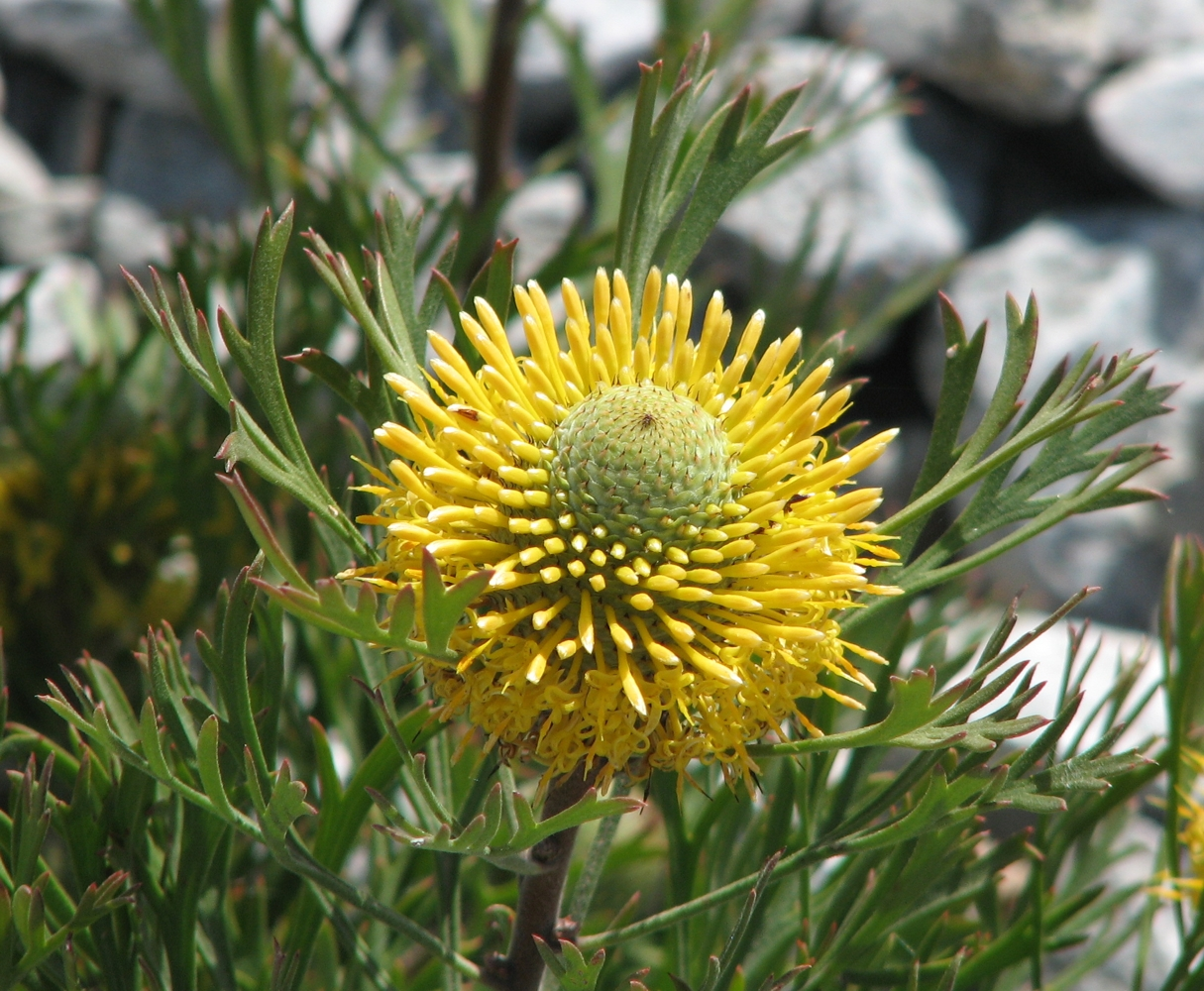
- In Royal Botanic Gardens, Cranbourne

Scientific classification
- Kingdom: Plantae
- Clade: Tracheophytes
- Clade: Angiosperms
- Clade: Eudicots
- Order: Proteales
- Family: Proteaceae
- Genus: Isopogon
- Species: I. anemonifolius

Binomial name
- Isopogon anemonifolius (Salisb.) Knight

Synonyms
- List: Atylus anemonifolius (Salisb.) Kuntze; Isopogon anemonifolius (Salisb.) R.Br. isonym; Isopogon anemonifolius (Salisb.) Knight f. anemonifolius; Isopogon anemonifolius f. simplicifolia Cheel; Isopogon anemonifolius (Salisb.) Knight var. anemonifolius; Isopogon anemonifolius var. glaber R.Br.; Isopogon anemonifolius var. pubescens R.Br.; Isopogon anemonifolius var. pubiflorus Benth.; Isopogon tridactylidis (Cav.) Roem. & Schult.; Protea anemonifolia Salisb.; Protea anemonifolius J.Wrigley & Fagg orth. var.; Protea apifolia Meisn. nom. inval., pro syn.; Protea tridactylides Cav.

= Isopogon anemonifolius =

Species of shrub native to Australia

Isopogon anemonifolius, commonly known as broad-leaved drumsticks, is a shrub of the family Proteaceae that is native only to eastern New South Wales in Australia. It occurs naturally in woodland, open forest, and heathland on sandstone soils. I. anemonifolius usually ranges between one and two metres in height, and is generally smaller in exposed heathland. Its leaves are divided and narrow, though broader than those of the related Isopogon anethifolius, and have a purplish tinge during the cooler months. The yellow flowers appear during late spring or early summer and are displayed prominently. They are followed by round grey cones, which give the plant its common name drumsticks. The small hairy seeds are found in the old flower parts.

A long-lived plant reaching an age of up to 60 years, I. anemonifolius resprouts from its woody base, known as a lignotuber, after bushfire. Seedlings appear in the year following a fire. Although I. anemonifolius was collected by Daniel Solander in 1770, it was not described until 1796 by Richard Salisbury. Several varieties have been named, though none are now recognised as distinct. It was first cultivated in the United Kingdom in 1791. I. anemonifolius grows readily in the garden if located in a sunny or part-shaded spot with sandy soil and good drainage.

== Description ==
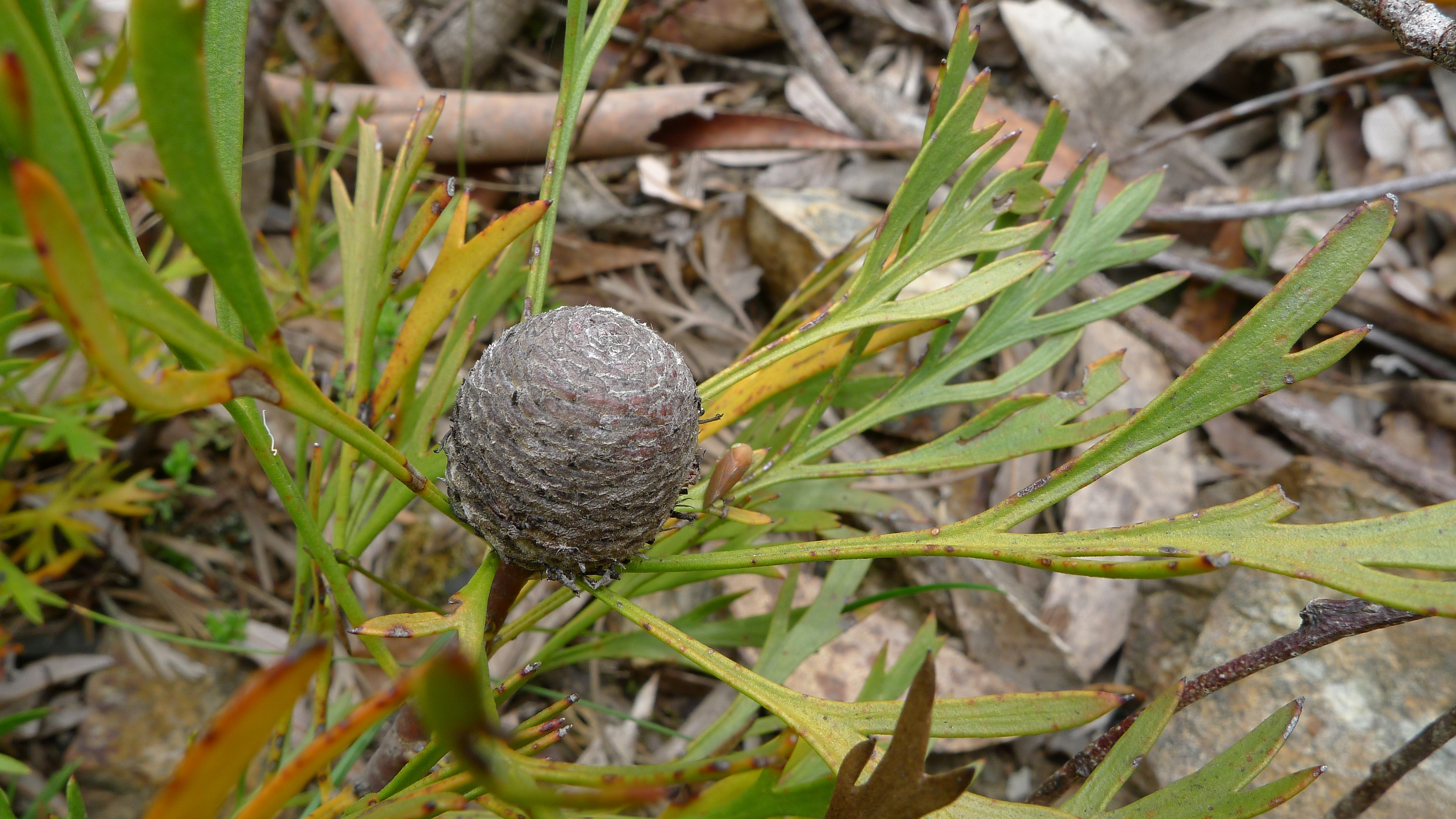
The old cone, which gives the plant its common name

Isopogon anemonifolius grows as an evergreen, woody shrub to 1–1.5 m (3 1/4–5 ft) in height, but is restricted to approximately 50 cm (1 3/4 ft) on exposed heaths and headlands. The leaves are 5–11 cm (2–4 1/4 in) long and forked after 2–5 cm (3/4–2 in) into three segments, then often forked a second time. The leaf tips are pointed. Leaves can vary markedly on single plants, with some leaves undivided. Leaf surfaces are generally smooth, though occasionally covered with fine hair. Its flat leaves distinguish it from the terete (round in cross-section) leaves of Isopogon anethifolius; they are also broader, at 3–5 mm (1/8–3/16 in) wide compared with the 1 mm (1/25 in) wide leaves of the latter species. The new growth and leaves of I. anemonifolius may be flushed red to purple, particularly in winter. The globular inflorescences appear any time from July to January, being most abundant in October. They are 3–4 cm (1 1/8–1 5/8 in) in diameter, and grow terminally at the tips of branches, or occasionally axillary (arising on short stems off branches). The individual flowers average 1.2 cm (1/2 in) long. They are straight stalkless structures arising from a basal scale. The perianth, a tube that envelopes the flower's sexual organs, splits into four segments, revealing a thin delicate style tipped with the stigma. At the ends of the four perianth segments are the male pollen-bearing structures known as anthers. Arranged in a spiral pattern, the flowers open from the bottom of the flowerhead inwards. Flowering is followed by the development of the round fruiting cones, which have a diameter of 1–1.6 cm (3/8–5/8 in). The seed-bearing nuts are small—less than 4 mm (3/16 in) across—and lined with hairs.

== Taxonomy ==
Swedish naturalist Daniel Solander, after collecting a specimen at Botany Bay in 1770 on the first voyage of Captain James Cook, was the first to write of this species. He gave it the name Leucadendron apiifolium, but never officially described it. The specific epithet referred to the similarity of its leaves to Apium (celery).

In 1796, English botanist Richard Salisbury published a formal description of the species, from a specimen collected in Port Jackson (Sydney). He gave it the name Protea anemonifolia, the specific epithet derived from anemone and folium, the latter meaning "leaf", highlighting the resemblance of its leaves to those of anemones. The common name drumsticks is derived from their globular cones.

In 1799, the Spanish botanist Antonio José Cavanilles described Protea tridactylides, later identified as a junior synonym by Salisbury and the English horticulturalist Joseph Knight. Salisbury founded the new genus Atylus in 1807 to remove this and other species from Protea, but did not make proper combinations for them in the new genus. It gained its current name in 1809 when it was redescribed as the anemone-leaved isopogon (Isopogon anemonefolius) in the controversial work On the cultivation of the plants belonging to the natural order of Proteeae, published under Knight's name but written by Salisbury. (Note: The first component of compound words were later ruled to end in 'i' under the International Code of Nomenclature.) Scottish naturalist Robert Brown had written of the genus Isopogon but Salisbury and Knight had hurried out their work before Brown's. Brown's description appeared in his paper On the natural order of plants called Proteaceae, subsequently published as "On the Proteaceae of Jussieu" in the Transactions of the Linnean Society in 1810.

In 1891, German botanist Otto Kuntze published Revisio generum plantarum, his response to what he perceived as a lack of method in existing nomenclatural practice. He revived the genus Atylus on the grounds of priority, and correctly made the combination Atylus anemonifolius. However, Kuntze's revisionary program was not accepted by the majority of botanists. Ultimately, the genus Isopogon was nomenclaturally conserved over Atylus by the International Botanical Congress of 1905.

Several varieties have been described but have been synonymised with I. anemonifolius or recognised as distinct species. Brown described varieties glaber, identified by wholly smooth leaves and branches, and pubescens, with leaves and branches covered in fine pale grey hairs, in 1830. English botanist George Bentham tentatively described variety pubiflorus in his 1870 work Flora Australiensis. He queried that it may have been from Sydney, and had a slightly hairy perianth. These are not regarded as distinct. Victorian Government botanist Ferdinand von Mueller described I. anemonifolius var. tenuifolius in 1870, now recognised as I. prostratus. Australian botanist Edwin Cheel described forma simplicifolia in 1923, from collections from Mount Victoria and Hornsby. He described it as having mostly unlobed (simple) leaves compared with the typical form. His variety ceratophylloides is now a separate species, I. petiolaris.

== Distribution and habitat ==
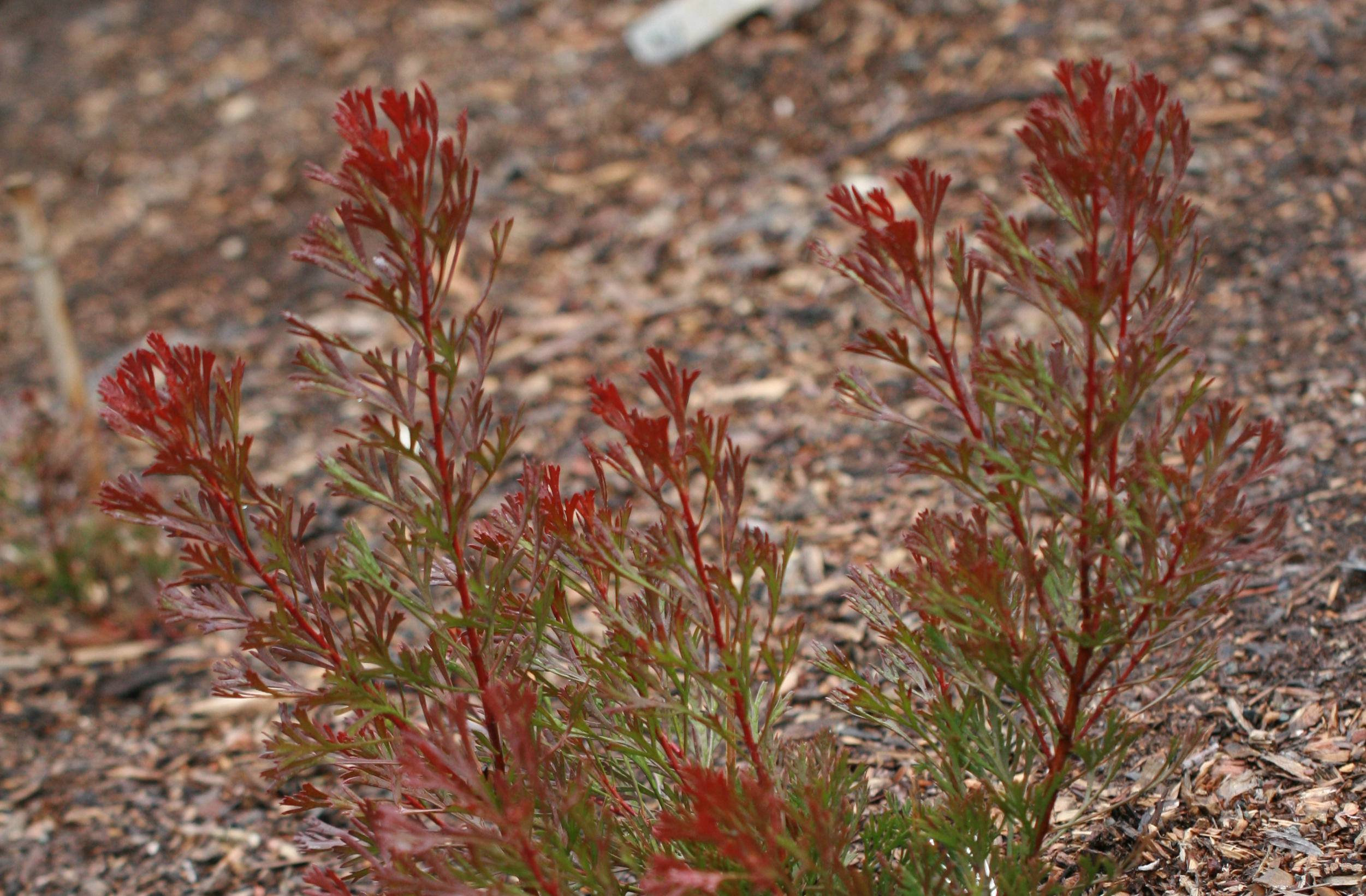
The red winter leaf colours

I. anemonifolius is found along the east coast of New South Wales, from near the Victorian border almost to (and possibly reaching) Queensland. It is most common between Smoky Cape and Ulladulla. There is an outlying population in the vicinity of Torrington in the New England region. It occurs naturally from sea level to 1200 m (4000 ft) and is found on low-nutrient sandstone soils in heathland and dry sclerophyll woodland, particularly along ridges or tops of hills. Typical woodland trees it is associated with include the scribbly gums Eucalyptus haemastoma and E. sclerophylla, yertchuk (E. consideniana), yellow bloodwood (Corymbia eximia), red bloodwood (C. gummifera) and smooth-barked apple (Angophora costata), and heathland plants such as rusty banksia (Banksia oblongifolia), swamp banksia (B. paludosa), mountain devil (Lambertia formosa), conesticks (Petrophile pulchella), tick bush (Kunzea ambigua), forest oak (Allocasuarina torulosa) and Hakea laevipes.

== Ecology ==
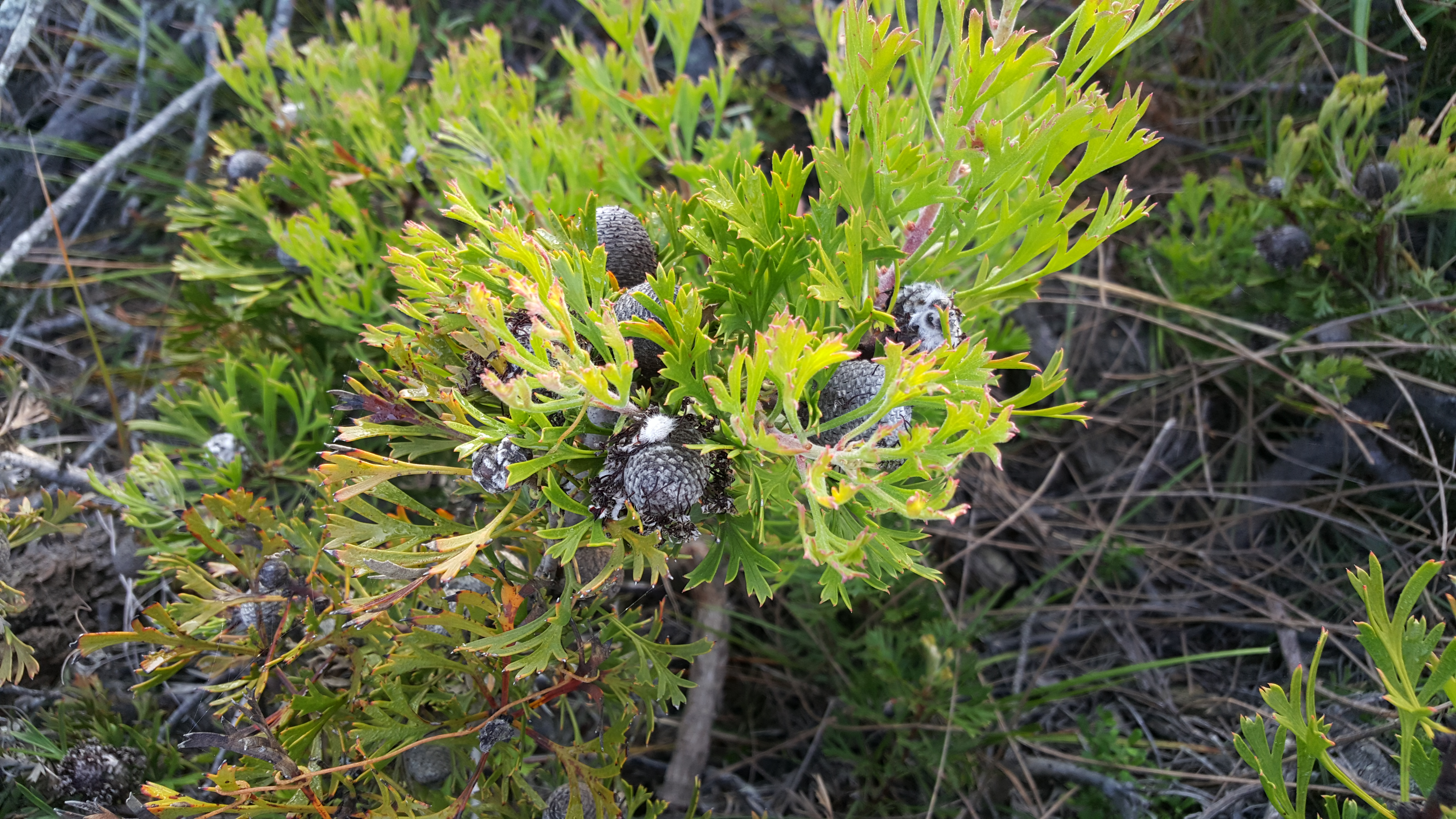
Fluffy seed pods can be seen in the old cones, Wybung Head

I. anemonifolius is a long-lived plant, with a lifespan of 60 years. It resprouts from its woody base, known as a lignotuber, approximately two months after being burnt in a bushfire. The resultant new growth takes two years to flower, though older plants with larger lignotubers are able to re-grow more quickly. I. anemonifolius is slow-growing; a 1990 field study in Brisbane Water National Park found that the lignotuber grew at a rate of 0.173 cm per existing cm of lignotuber per year, yielding a lignotuber of around 1 cm (3/8 in) in diameter at 10 years of age and 5 cm (2.0 in) diameter at 20 years of age. The largest lignotubers found have a diameter of 40 cm (16 in).

Plants need a lignotuber of 2 cm (3/4 in) diameter to survive low intensity fires. Plants are able to resprout after more intense fires once they reach 15 years of age. I. anemonifolius is also serotinous—the seeds are held on the plant as a canopy-based seedbank and are released after fire. Most seedlings arise within a year of a bushfire, though very few are seen at other times. The seedbank is most productive between 25 and 35 years after a previous fire. However, seedlings may be outcompeted by seedlings of obligate seeder species. The seeds of I. anemonifolius fall directly to the ground or are blown a short distance by wind. Young plants flower about seven years after germinating from seed. Repeated bushfire intervals of less than 10 years' duration are likely to result both in reduced survival of older plants and in recruitment of seedlings, possibly leading to local extinction in 50 years. Intervals of at least 12–13 years for low intensity fires and 15 years for hotter fires are needed for population stability.

Leaf spotting is caused by the fungus Vizella. Flower buds may be damaged by weevils.

== Cultivation ==
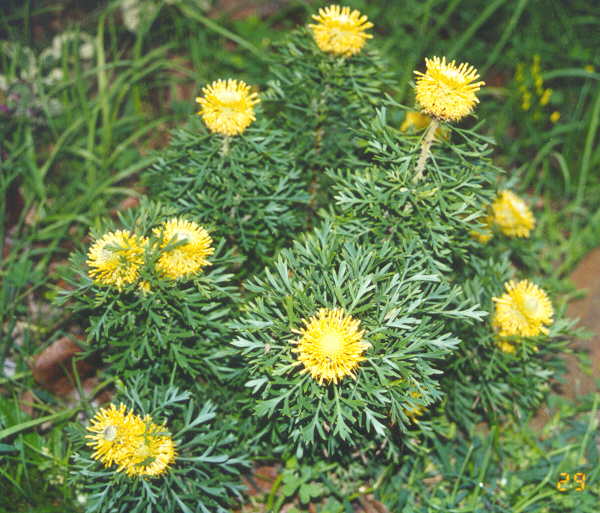
'Woorikee 2000'

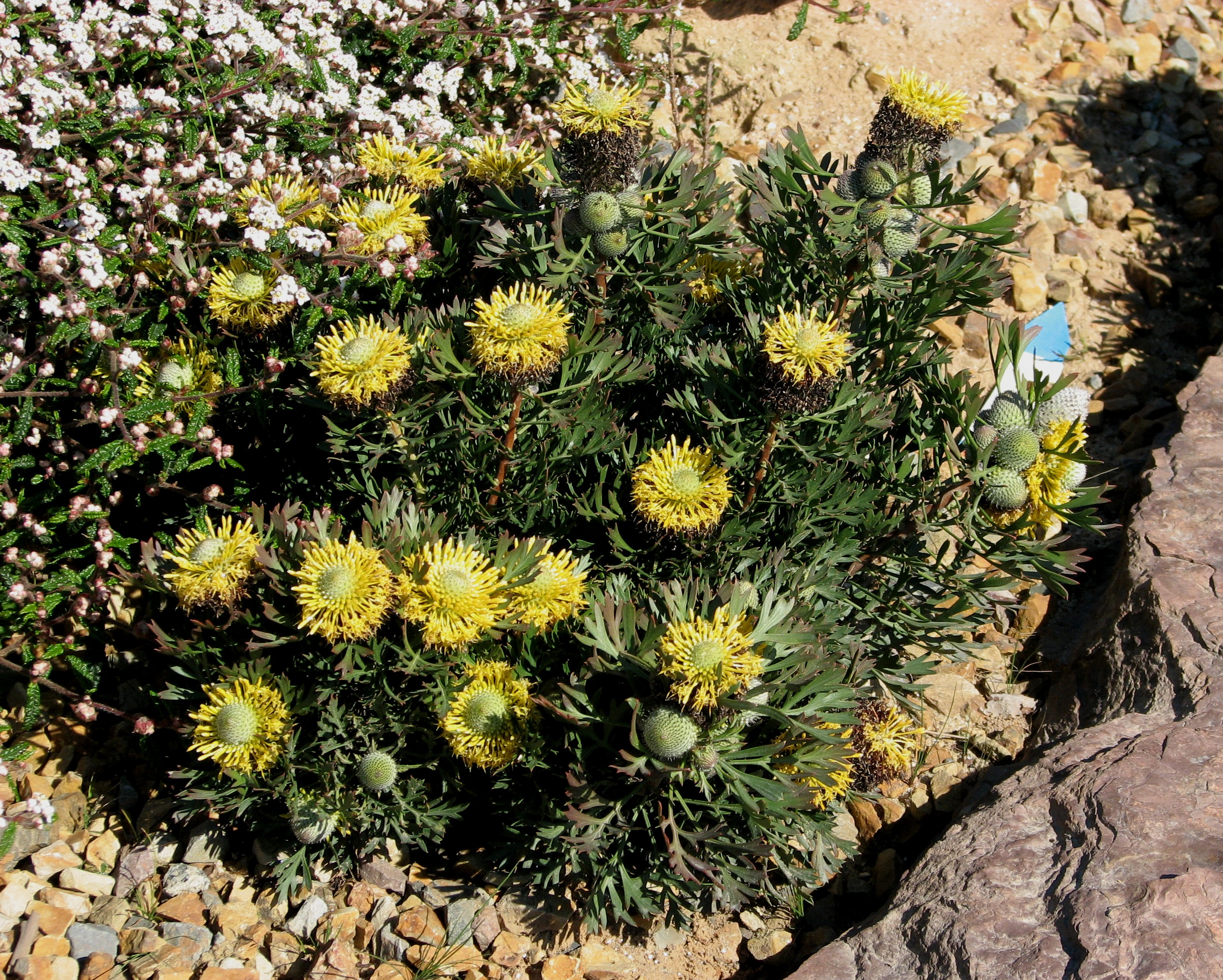
'Little Drumsticks'

I. anemonifolius was first cultivated in the United Kingdom in 1791. Knight reported that it flowered and set seed there. With attractive foliage and prominently displayed flowers and cones, I. anemonifolius adapts readily to cultivation; plants can be grown in rock gardens, as borders, or as a pot plant. Garden plants can be variable, with either upright or spreading habits; and some maintain a naturally compact habit without pruning. It grows readily in sandy well-drained soil in either a sunny or part-shaded position. The species is suited to USDA hardiness zones 9 to 11. It is hardy in frosts and dry spells, but produces more flowers with extra moisture. It can be pruned heavily once established.

Propagation is by seed or cuttings of hardened growth less than a year old. The seed can be collected from the cones and stored; they are best sown in spring or autumn. The stems and flowers are long-lasting if put in water. The flowers, cones and foliage are used in the cut-flower industry.

Isopogon 'Woorikee 2000' is a selected dwarf form of I. anemonifolius, propagated by Bill Molyneux of Austraflora Nursery in Victoria. It produces abundant flowerheads. Plant Breeders Rights were granted in Australia in 1997 and the cultivar became commercially available in 1999. Another dwarf cultivar, 'Little Drumsticks', is also sold.
