= Vizellaceae =

Scientific classification
- Kingdom: Fungi
- Division: Ascomycota
- Class: Dothideomycetes
- Subclass: incertae sedis
- Family: Vizellaceae; H.J.Swart (1971)

Type genus
- Vizella Sacc. (1883)

Genera
- Blasdalea; Chrysogloeum; Entopeltis; Haplopyrenula; Hypocelis; Phaeopeltis; Singeriella; Stigmatopeltis; Vizella

Family of fungi

The Vizellaceae are a family of fungi with an uncertain taxonomic placement in the class Dothideomycetes. The family was circumscribed by Dutch mycologist Haring Johannes Swart in 1971. It originally held Blasdalea and the type genus Vizella. Vizellaceae species are found on all continents, particularly in tropical and subtropical regions.

== Description ==
Vizellaceae species are fungi that grow in or under the host plant's leaf cuticle. They have flattened, disc-like or irregular fruitbodies. Their asci are bitunicate, meaning they have two functional layers, an elastic internal wall and an external wall. The ascospores are unicellular, or apiosporous (bicellular, with one cell smaller than the other). They are brown, with a translucent crosswise band.
