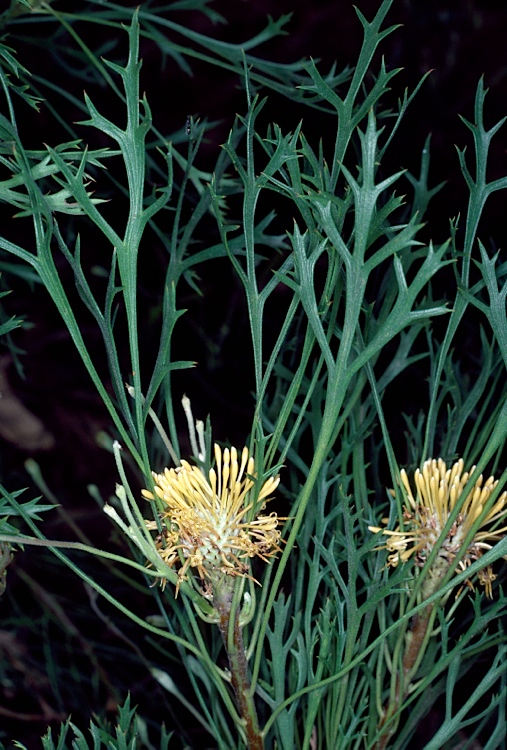
- In the Australian National Botanic Gardens

Scientific classification
- Kingdom: Plantae
- Clade: Tracheophytes
- Clade: Angiosperms
- Clade: Eudicots
- Order: Proteales
- Family: Proteaceae
- Genus: Isopogon
- Species: I. petiolaris

Binomial name
- Isopogon petiolaris R.Br.
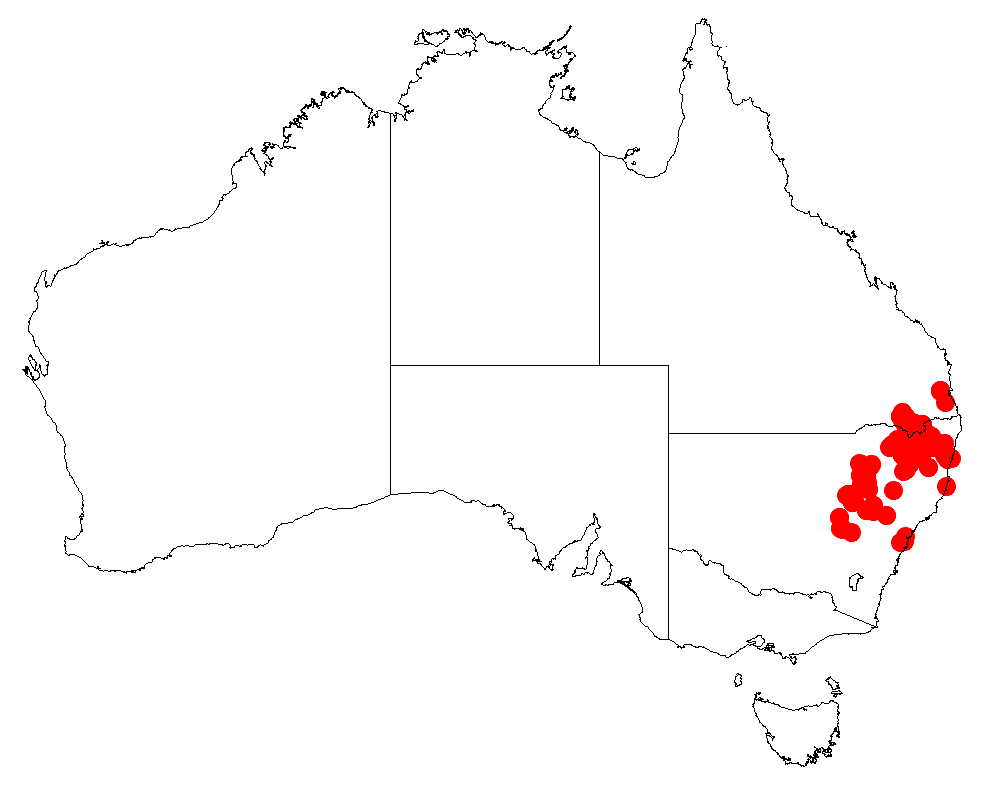
- Occurrence data from Australasian Virtual Herbarium

Synonyms
- Atylus petiolaris (R.Br.) Kuntze; Isopogon anemonifolius var. ceratophylloides Cheel

= Isopogon petiolaris =

Species of shrub endemic to Australia

Isopogon petiolaris is a species of plant in the family Proteaceae and is endemic to eastern Australia. It is a low, spreading shrub with sharply-pointed, divided leaves and more or less spherical heads of yellow flowers.

== Description ==
Isopogon petiolaris is a low, spreading shrub that typically grows to a height of less than 1 m (3 ft 3 in) and has reddish brown branchlets. The leaves are mostly 90–150 mm (3.5–5.9 in) long, pinnately or ternately divided, the undivided part 60–100 mm (2.4–3.9 in) long, the lobes 3–7 mm (0.12–0.28 in) wide and sharply pointed. The flowers are arranged in sessile, more or less spherical heads 15–20 mm (0.59–0.79 in) in diameter, surrounded by leaves with involucral bracts at the base. The flowers are 8–10 mm (0.31–0.39 in) long, yellow and more or less glabrous. Flowering occurs from July to November and the fruit is a hairy nut, fused with others in spherical to oval head 12–16 mm (0.47–0.63 in) in diameter.

== Taxonomy ==
Isopogon petiolaris was first formally described in 1830 by Robert Brown in the Supplementum to his Prodromus Florae Novae Hollandiae et Insulae Van Diemen from specimens collected in 1827 near Moreton Bay, by Allan Cunningham.

== Distribution and habitat ==
Isopogon petiolaris mostly grows in stony places in forest and heath from the Darling Downs in south-eastern Queensland and south through the Northern Tablelands to near Parramatta and west to the Pilliga forest and Parkes.
