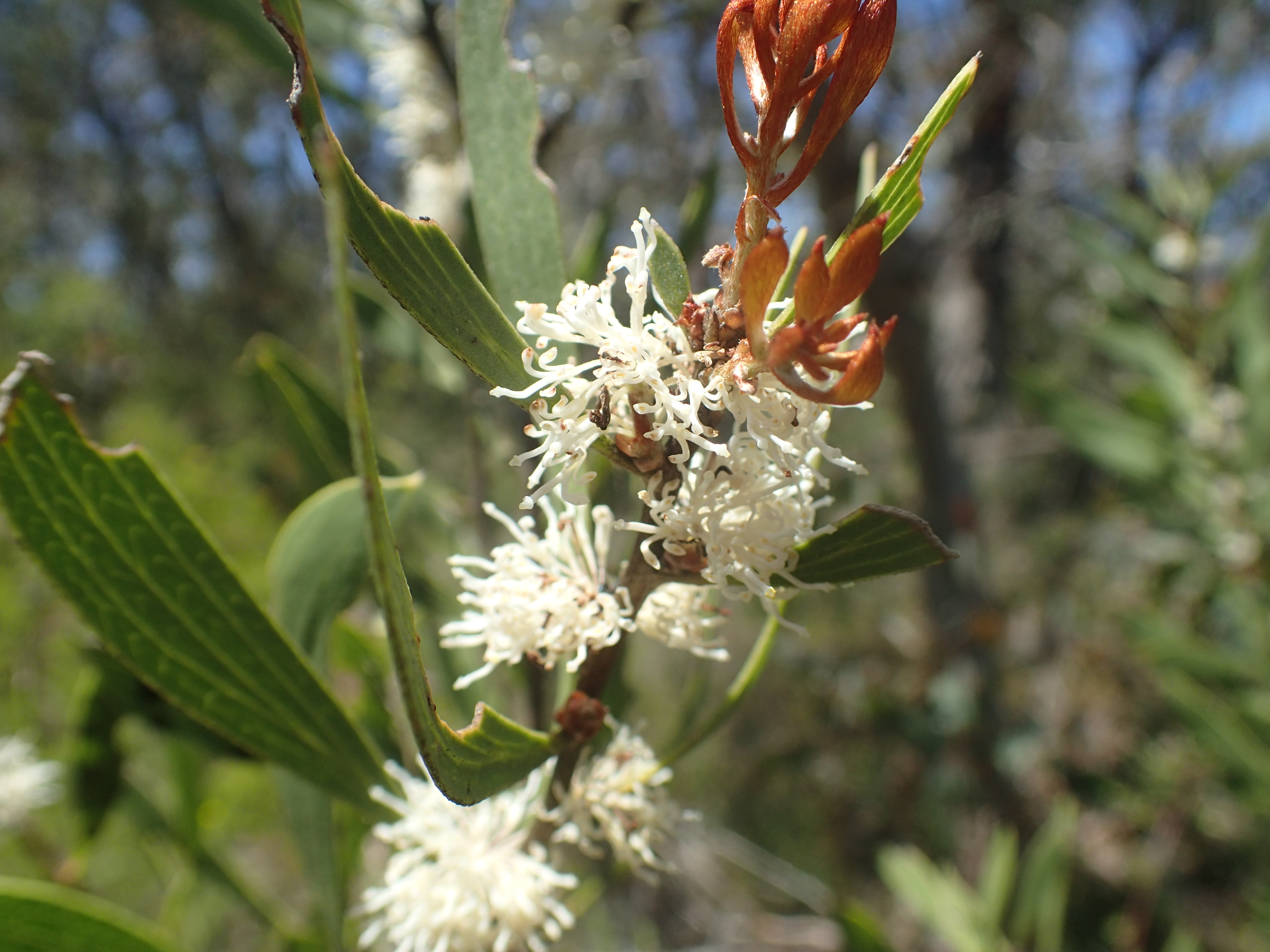
- Near Blackheath

Scientific classification
- Kingdom: Plantae
- Clade: Embryophytes
- Clade: Tracheophytes
- Clade: Spermatophytes
- Clade: Angiosperms
- Clade: Eudicots
- Order: Proteales
- Family: Proteaceae
- Genus: Hakea
- Species: H. laevipes

Binomial name
- Hakea laevipes Gand.
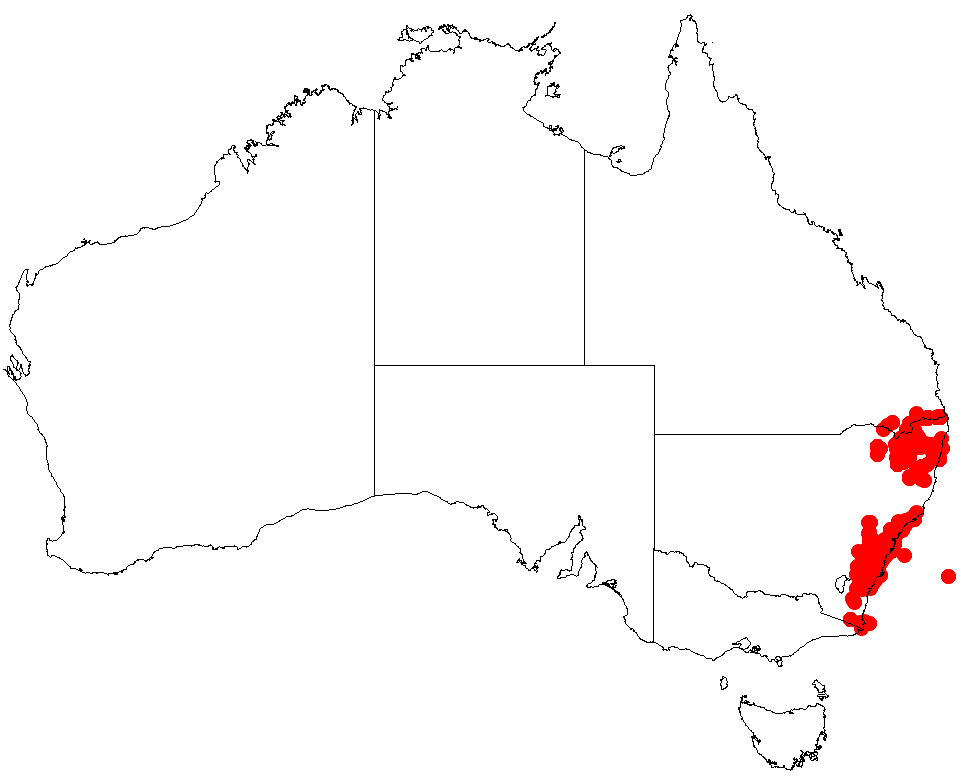
- Occurrence data from AVH

= Hakea laevipes =

Species of shrub native to Australia

Hakea laevipes is a shrub in the family Proteaceae. A widespread species found growing on Australian coastal and tableland locations mainly in eastern New South Wales, with scattered populations in south-eastern Queensland.

== Description ==
Hakea laevipes is an erect bushy lignotuberous shrub 0.3–3 m (1–10 ft) high. Its branchlets are dark brown densely covered with short soft hairs at flowering time. The leaves are lance shaped tapering at each end to egg-shaped, occasionally spatula-shaped sometimes sickle shaped curving to a point, 5–12 cm (2–5 in) long and 4.5–30 mm (0.2–1 in) wide. The leaves have 3–5 longitudinal veins with conspicuous secondary veins. The fruit are broadly three dimensional to egg-shaped 20–30 mm (0.8–1 in) long and 13–21 mm (0.5–0.8 in) wide with a rough warty surface ending at the apex with an obscure beak. Cream flowers appear from October to January.

== Taxonomy and naming ==
Hakea laevipes was first formally described in 1919 by Michel Gandoger and the description was published in Bulletin de la Société Botanique de France. The specific epithet (laevipes) is derived from the Latin words laevis meaning "smooth", "polished" or "bald" and pes meaning "foot", since Gandoger described the species as having a smooth flower stalk. When Gandoger initially named the species, he compared it to H. leucopoda and H. incrassans, both synonyms of H. dactyloides. In 1973, John MacGillivray noted that the stalk of the individual flowers on the single specimen were not without hairs but possessing a "subsericeous indumentum", meaning closely pressed silky hairs. Therefore, despite its name, this species does have hairy flower stalks.

There are two subspecies:

- Hakea laevipes subsp. graniticola distribution is restricted to north-eastern New South Wales and south-eastern Queensland often in higher altitudes of the Great Dividing Range extending to the slopes of Warialda and possibly in the Yetman district usually growing in coarse sandy soil on granite outcrops. This subspecies differs from subspecies laevipes in having smooth flower stalks.
- Hakea laevipes subsp. laevipes distribution is similar to Hakea laevipes growing in the North, Central and South Coast and Tableland regions of New South Wales extending to the North Western Plains and in south-eastern Queensland but not extending as far north-west as subspecies graniticola. This subspecies has short soft hairs on the flower stalks.

== Distribution and habitat ==
Hakea laevipes is a widespread species growing from the coast to tablelands in N.S.W mostly on sandy soils in dry sclerophyll forest, woodland and heath. It is found to the north of Green Cape and inland to the Warialda and Yetman districts. It also grows in south-eastern Queensland.

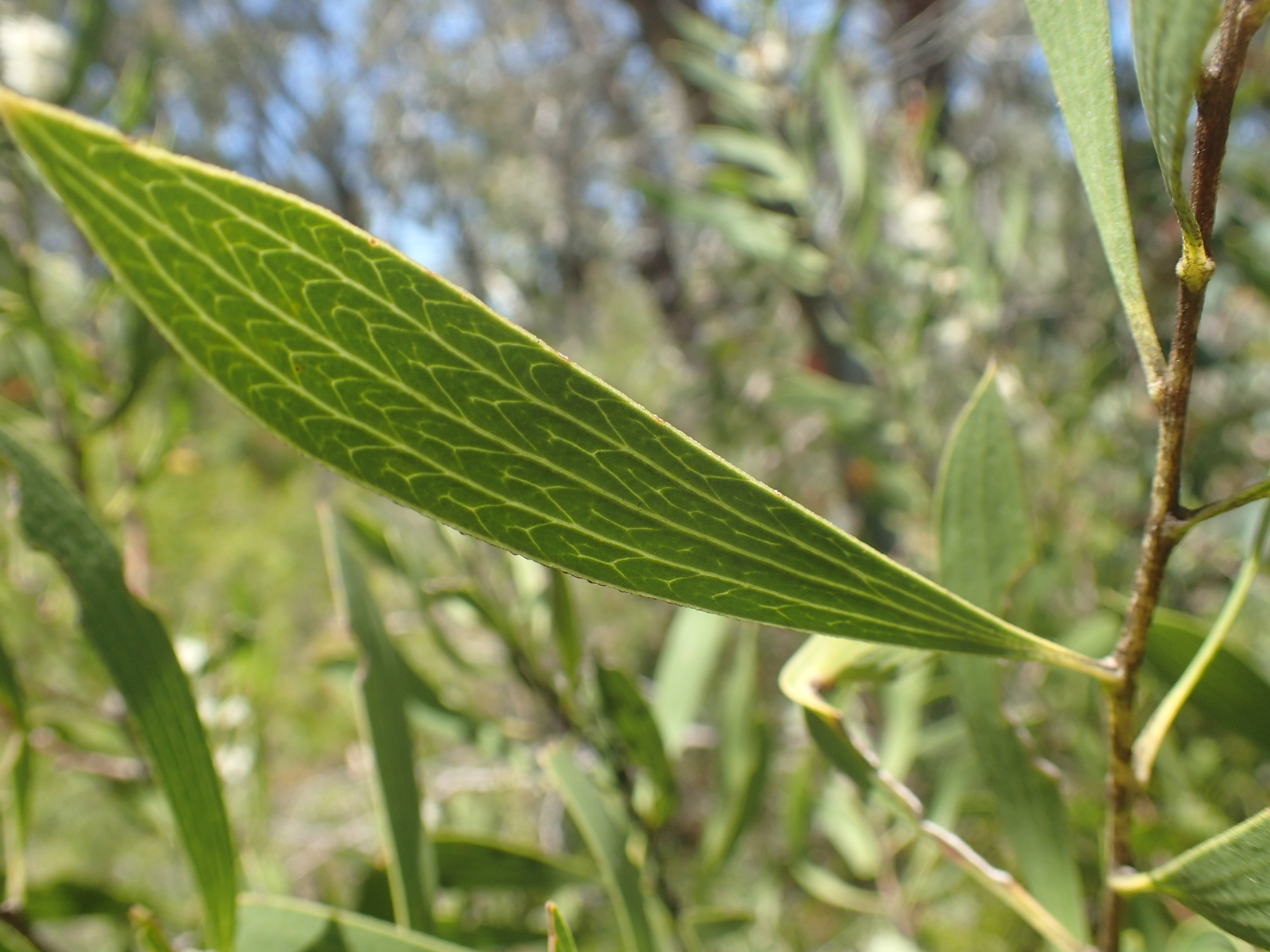
Leaf

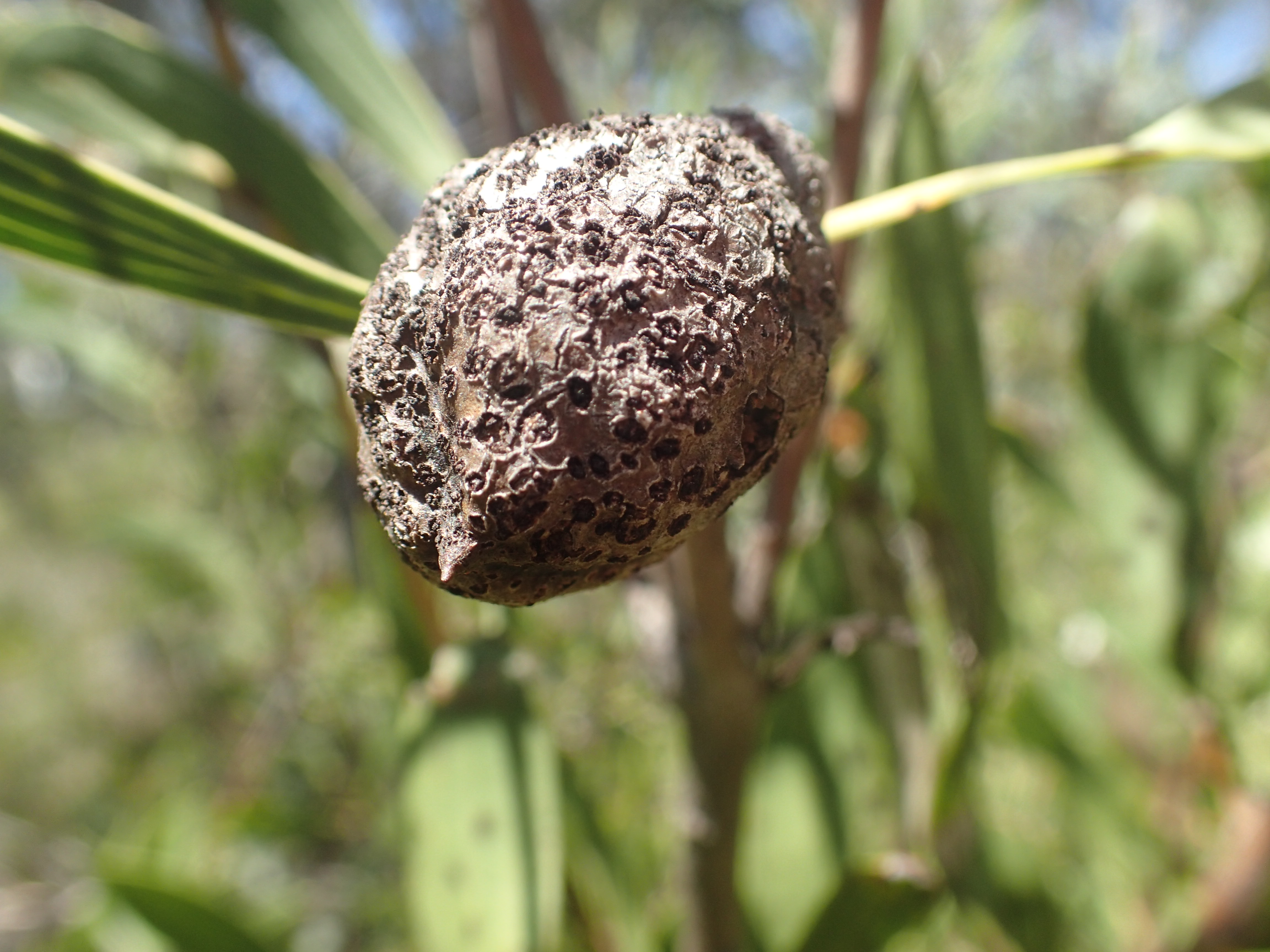
Fruit
