= Vizella =

Scientific classification
- Kingdom: Fungi
- Division: Ascomycota
- Class: Dothideomycetes
- Family: Vizellaceae
- Genus: Vizella; Sacc. (1883)

Type species
- Vizella conferta (Cooke) Sacc. (1883)

Synonyms
- Haplopyrenula Müll.Arg. (1883); Entopeltis Höhn. (1910); Phaeopeltis Petch (1919); Stigmatopeltis Doidge (1927); Hypocelis Petr. (1929); Phaeaspis Clem. & Shear (1931); Haplospora Räsänen (1943); Haplopyrenulomyces] Cif. & Tomas. (1953); Mycerema Bat., J.L.Bezerra & Cavalc. (1963)

Genus of fungi

Vizella is a genus of leaf-inhabiting fungi in the class Dothideomycetes, and the type genus of the family Vizellaceae. The genus was circumscribed by Pier Andrea Saccardo in 1883.

== Species ==
- Vizella amazonica M.L.Farr 1987
- Vizella appendiculosa (Mont. & Berk.) Theiss. 1914
- Vizella banksiae H.J.Swart 1971
- Vizella bingervilliana C.Moreau & M.Moreau 1951
- Vizella conferta (Cooke) Sacc. 1883
- Vizella crescentiae Bat. & J.L.Bezerra 1960
- Vizella discontinua Selkirk 1972
- Vizella gomphispora (Berk. & Broome) S.Hughes 1953
- Vizella grandis Speg. 1922
- Vizella grevilleae H.J.Swart 1975
- Vizella guaranitica Speg. 1888
- Vizella guilielmi Rehm 1911
- Vizella gustaviae Bat. & I.H.Lima 1957
- Vizella hendrickxii (Hansf.) S.Hughes 1953
- Vizella hieronymi G.Winter 1885
- Vizella memorabilis (Dilcher) Selkirk 1972
- Vizella metrosideri P.R.Johnst. 2000
- Vizella oleariae H.J.Swart 1971
- Vizella passiflorae Rehm 1913
- Vizella philothecae Cunningt. 2005
- Vizella pogonophorae Bat. & Cif. 1957
- Vizella psychotriae Bat. & Peres 1960
- Vizella pycnanthi Sivan. 1973
- Vizella royenae (Doidge) Arx & E.Müll. 1954
- Vizella splendida Bat. & J.L.Bezerra 1960
- Vizella tunicata Gadgil 1995
- Vizella urvilleana Speg. 1909
- Vizella vochysiacearum (Bat., J.L.Bezerra & Cavalc.) J.K.Liu, R.Phookamsak & K.D.Hyde 2013
- Vizella xanthorrhoeae Sivan. & B.Sutton 1985
