= Revisio Generum Plantarum =

19th-century botanic treatise by Otto Kuntze

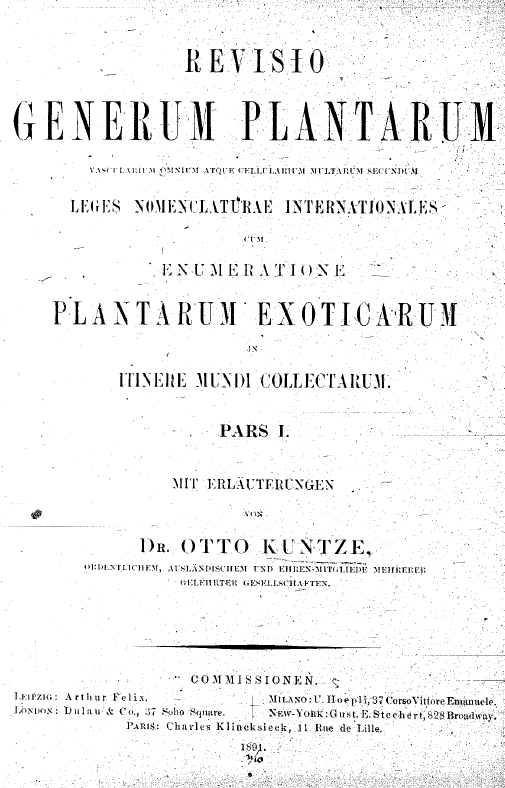
Frontispiece of Revisio Generum Plantarum

Revisio Generum Plantarum, also known by its standard botanical abbreviation Revis. Gen. Pl., is a botanic treatise by Otto Kuntze. It was published in three volumes; the first two of these appeared in 1891, and the third was published in two parts in 1893 and 1898.

In the first two volumes, Kuntze described his entire collection of specimens from his voyage around the world, comprising around 7,700 specimens. In doing so, however, he took the opportunity to introduce his novel approach to plant nomenclature, completely revising the nomenclature of many plant taxa. This came as a surprise to most botanists, who rejected or deliberately ignored the work. His third volume replied to much of the criticism leveled against his novel system, but it was still not accepted, and Kuntze remained in dispute with the botanical community over it for the rest of this life.
