= Microthyrium =

Scientific classification
- Kingdom: Fungi
- Division: Ascomycota
- Class: Dothideomycetes
- Order: Microthyriales
- Family: Microthyriaceae
- Genus: Microthyrium; Desm.

Type species
- Microthyrium microscopicum Desm.

Genus of fungi

Microthyrium is a genus of fungi in the Microthyriaceae family.

== Species ==
As accepted by Species Fungorum;

- Microthyrium aberrans Speg. (1910)
- Microthyrium abnorme Henn. (1905)
- Microthyrium acaciae Höhn. (1920)
- Microthyrium annuliforme Syd. (1914)
- Microthyrium antivarense (Bubák) Crous (1999)
- Microthyrium applanatum Rehm (1908)
- Microthyrium arizonense A.W. Ramaley (1999)
- Microthyrium baccarum Rehm (1882)
- Microthyrium biciliatum S.K. Bose & E. Müll. (1964)
- Microthyrium browneanum Sacc. (1921)
- Microthyrium buxicola Hongsanan & K.D. Hyde (2015)
- Microthyrium calophylli R.W. Ryan (1924)
- Microthyrium cantareirense Henn. (1902)
- Microthyrium carludovicae Henn. (1905)
- Microthyrium cassiae Bat. (1959)
- Microthyrium chinense N.I. de Silva & K.D. Hyde (2017)
- Microthyrium ciliatum Gremmen & De Kam (1969)
- Microthyrium coffeae Henn. (1903)
- Microthyrium cordiae Bat., Peres & F.B. Leal (1959)
- Microthyrium corynellum Tassi (1900)
- Microthyrium crassum Rehm (1910)
- Microthyrium cryptomeriae Sawada (1950)
- Microthyrium cycadinum I. Hino & Katum. (1964)
- Microthyrium cytisi Fuckel (1870)
- Microthyrium disjunctum Rehm (1908)
- Microthyrium ekmanii Petr. & Cif. (1932)
- Microthyrium epimyces Sacc., E. Bommer & M. Rousseau (1887)
- Microthyrium eucalypti Henn. (1901)
- Microthyrium eucalypticola Speg. (1909)
- Microthyrium exarescens Rehm (1900)
- Microthyrium fagi J.P. Ellis (1977)
- Microthyrium fici-septicae Tennakoon, C.H. Kuo & K.D. Hyde (2021)
- Microthyrium gramineum Sacc., E. Bommer & M. Rousseau (1890)
- Microthyrium grammatophylli Sacc. (1921)
- Microthyrium guadalupense A.W. Ramaley (1999)
- Microthyrium harrimanii Sacc. (1904)
- Microthyrium hederae Feltgen (1903)
- Microthyrium hippocrateae (R.W. Ryan) Toro (1932)
- Microthyrium holmiae Nograsek (1990)
- Microthyrium ilicinum De Not. (1862)
- Microthyrium imperatae Syd. & P. Syd. (1914)
- Microthyrium inconspicuum J.P. Ellis (1977)
- Microthyrium lauraceae Henn. (1908)
- Microthyrium laurentii Henn. (1906)
- Microthyrium lauri Höhn. (1919)
- Microthyrium leopoldvilleanum Henn. (1906)
- Microthyrium litorale Speg. (1921)
- Microthyrium macrosporum (Sacc.) Höhn. (1919)
- Microthyrium maculicola Doidge (1920)
- Microthyrium magellanicum Speg. (1924)
- Microthyrium mahabaleshwarense Subhedar & V.G. Rao (1986)
- Microthyrium malenconianum Maire (1937)
- Microthyrium manihoticola Viégas (1944)
- Microthyrium mbdense Henn. (1908)
- Microthyrium melaleucae Henn. (1903)
- Microthyrium microscopicum Desm. (1841)
- Microthyrium mischocarpi Syd. & P. Syd. (1917)
- Microthyrium moravicum Petr. (1925)
- Microthyrium munozi Toro (1932)
- Microthyrium nebulosum (Speg.) G. Arnaud (1918)
- Microthyrium nerii S. Ahmad (1971)
- Microthyrium nigropapillatum Sawada (1922)
- Microthyrium nolinae A.W. Ramaley (1999)
- Microthyrium olivaceum (Höhn.) Theiss. (1912)
- Microthyrium pamelae L. Holm & K. Holm (1980)
- Microthyrium paraguayense Speg. (1885)
- Microthyrium phegopteridis Magnus (1906)
- Microthyrium phoradendri Garcés (1944)
- Microthyrium pieridis S.K. Bose & E. Müll. (1964)
- Microthyrium pinophyllum (Höhn.) Petr. (1927)
- Microthyrium pithecellobii Bat. & C.A.A. Costa (1959)
- Microthyrium propagulense H.X. Wu & K.D. Hyde (2013)
- Microthyrium pyrenaicum Petr. (1947)
- Microthyrium ranulisporum Doidge (1927)
- Microthyrium rhombisporum Garcés (1944)
- Microthyrium rimulosum Speg. (1909)
- Microthyrium rubicola H.C. Greene (1963)
- Microthyrium salicis Höhn. (1919)
- Microthyrium scutiae Speg. (1912)
- Microthyrium senegalense Speg. (1914)
- Microthyrium sequoiae (Cooke & Harkn.) Höhn. (1917)
- Microthyrium setosum Dennis & Spooner (1977)
- Microthyrium styracis Starbäck (1904)
- Microthyrium subulati P.C. Gupta (1974)
- Microthyrium thujae Dearn. (1924)
- Microthyrium tunicae Golovin (1950)
- Microthyrium umbelliferarum Höhn. (1919)
- Microthyrium uvariae Henn. (1904)
- Microthyrium versicolor (Desm.) Höhn. (1910)

Former species; (assume family Microthyriaceae, unless mentioned),

- M. alpestre Sacc. (1880) = Lichenopeltella alpestris
- M. alsodeiae Henn. (1908) = Dictyothyrium alsodeiae, Micropeltidaceae
- M. amygdalinum Cooke & Massee (1891) = Phaeothyriolum amygdalinum
- M. arcticum Oudem. (1886) = Ronnigeria arctica, Leptopeltidaceae
- M. asterinoides Pat. (1888) = Prillieuxina asterinoides, Asterinaceae
- M. astomum Speg. (1910) = Microthyriolum astomum, Parmulariaceae
- M. caaguazuense Speg. (1885) = Asterinella caaguazensis
- M. caaguazuense f. coperniciae Rehm (1898) = Asterinella caaguazensis
- M. cetrariae Bres. (1897) = Lichenopeltella cetrariae
- M. ciliatum var. hederae J.P. Ellis (1977) = Microthyrium ciliatum
- M. circinans Speg. (1881) = Seynesia circinans, Cainiaceae
- M. confertum Theiss. (1909) = Calothyriopsis conferta
- M. culmigenum Syd. (1921) = Lichenopeltella alpestris
- M. cytisi var. ulicis J.P. Ellis (1977) = Microthyrium cytisi
- M. cytisi var. ulicis-gallii J.P. Ellis (1977) = Microthyrium cytisi
- M. dryadis (Rehm) M.E. Barr (1990) = Stomiopeltis dryadis, Micropeltidaceae
- M. eucalypti sensu Dick = Phaeothyriolum microthyrioides
- M. fuegianum Speg. (1887) = Dictyothyrium fuegianum, Micropeltidaceae
- M. fuscellum Sacc. (1880) = Tothia fuscella
- M. gomphisporum (Berk. & Broome) Sacc. (1883) = Vizella gomphispora, Vizellaceae
- M. gramineum var. major Grove (1933) = Microthyrium gramineum
- M. grande Niessl (1876) = Palawania grandis, Palawaniaceae
- M. ingae (R.W. Ryan) Toro (1926) = Aphanopeltis ingae, Asterinaceae
- M. iochromatis Rehm (1895) = Cyclotheca iochromatis
- M. juniperi (Desm.) Sacc. (1878) = Seynesiella juniperi
- M. lagunculariae G. Winter (1890) = Schizothyrium lagunculariae, Schizothyriaceae
- M. litigiosum (Desm.) Sacc. (1879) = Leptopeltis litigiosa, Leptopeltidaceae
- M. longisporum Pat. & Gaillard (1889) = Schizothyrium longisporum, Schizothyriaceae
- M. longisporum var. congoense Beeli (1923) = Schizothyrium longisporum, Schizothyriaceae
- M. loranthi (P. Karst. & Har.) Theiss. (1916) = Cyclotheca loranthi
- M. lunariae (Kunze) Fuckel (1874) = Leptothyrium lunariae, Pleosporales
- M. maculans Zopf (1898) = Lichenopeltella maculans
- M. malacoderma (Höhn.) Sacc. & Trotter (1913) = Schizothyrium malacodermum, Schizothyriaceae
- M. microscopicum f. macrosporum Sacc. (1883) = Microthyrium macrosporum
- M. microscopicum subsp. arctoalpinum Nograsek (1990) = Microthyrium microscopicum
- M. microscopicum var. dryadis Rehm (1904) = Stomiopeltis dryadis, Micropeltidaceae
- M. microscopicum var. macrosporum (Sacc.) J.P. Ellis (1977) = Microthyrium macrosporum
- M. microscopicum var. majus Speg. (1910) = Microthyrium microscopicum
- M. microscopicum var. minus Speg. (1910) = Microthyrium microscopicum
- M. nigroannulatum J. Webster (1952) = Lichenopeltella nigroannulata
- M. patagonicum Speg. (1909) = Stomiopeltella patagonica, Micropeltidaceae
- M. pinastri Fuckel (1875) = Stomiopeltis pinastri, Micropeltidaceae
- M. psychotriae Toro (1926) = Calothyrium ryanae
- M. pulchellum Speg. (1885) = Rhagadolobium pulchellum, Parmulariaceae
- M. pustulatum (Ellis) Theiss. (1912) = Calothyrium pustulatum
- M. reptans (Berk. & M.A. Curtis) Pat. (1903) = Trichothyrium reptans, Trichothyriaceae
- M. rhododendri Grove (1933) = Lembosina aulographoides, Lembosinaceae
- M. rickii (Rehm) Höhn. (1909) = Saccardinula rickii, Elsinoaceae
- M. smilacis De Not. (1845) = Muyocopron smilacis, Muyocopronaceae
- M. sprucei Cooke (1893) = Micropeltis sprucei, Micropeltidaceae
- M. virescens Speg. (1889) = Asterella virescens, Astrosphaeriellaceae
