= Trichothyrium =

Scientific classification
- Kingdom: Fungi
- Division: Ascomycota
- Class: Dothideomycetes
- Order: Microthyriales
- Family: Trichothyriaceae
- Genus: Trichothyrium; Speg.

Type species
- Trichothyrium sarciniferum Speg.

Genus of fungi

Trichothyrium is a genus of fungi in the family Trichothyriaceae.

== Species ==
As accepted by Species Fungorum;

- Trichothyrium alpestre Theiss. (1914)
- Trichothyrium asterolibertiae Deighton (1960)
- Trichothyrium asterophorum (Berk. & Broome) Höhn. (1908)
- Trichothyrium atroviolaceum (Henn.) Höhn. (1914)
- Trichothyrium austriacum Petr. (1940)
- Trichothyrium caruaruense Bat. & H. Maia (1957)
- Trichothyrium collapsum (Earle) Theiss. (1918)
- Trichothyrium consors Rehm ex Theiss. (1910)
- Trichothyrium densa (Racib.) H.X. Wu & K.D. Hyde (2011)
- Trichothyrium dubiosum (E. Bommer & M. Rousseau) Theiss. (1914)
- Trichothyrium iquitosense Theiss. (1919)
- Trichothyrium jungermannioides Racib. (1909)
- Trichothyrium lomatophorum Ellis & Everh. ex Seaver & Chardón (1926)
- Trichothyrium mirabilis (Rehm) Höhn. (1914)
- Trichothyrium modestum Bat. & H. Maia (1957)
- Trichothyrium oleaceae Gonz. Frag. & Cif. (1926)
- Trichothyrium orbiculare Syd. & P. Syd. (1913)
- Trichothyrium peristomale (Höhn.) H.X. Wu & K.D. Hyde (2011)
- Trichothyrium reptans (Berk. & M.A. Curtis) S. Hughes (1953)
- Trichothyrium robustum Doidge (1924)
- Trichothyrium sarciniferum Speg. (1889)
- Trichothyrium serratum Speg. (1889)
- Trichothyrium sexsporum Starbäck (1904)
- Trichothyrium spinulosum (Speg.) Höhn. (1914)
- Trichothyrium ulei (Henn.) Höhn. (1914)

Former species;

- T. alpestre f. pini-pumilionis Siemaszko (1925) = Trichothyrium alpestre, Trichothyriaceae
- T. asterophorum var. singulatum Bat. & H. Maia (1957) = Trichothyrium asterophorum, Trichothyriaceae
- T. chilense Speg. (1910) = Trichopeltina chilensis, Trichopeltinaceae
- T. densum Racib. (1909) = Trichothyrium densa, Trichothyriaceae
- T. dryadis (Rehm) Rehm (1909) = Stomiopeltis dryadis, Micropeltidaceae
- T. elegans Doidge (1924) = Trichothyrina elegans, Microthyriaceae
- T. epimyces (Sacc., E. Bommer & M. Rousseau) Theiss. (1917) = Microthyrium epimyces, Microthyriaceae
- T. hansfordii S. Hughes (1953) = Hansfordiella meliolae, Microthyriaceae
- T. notatum (Bat. & H. Maia) Arx (1962) = Trichothyriomyces notatus, Microthyriaceae
- T. pinophyllum (Höhn.) Petr. (1941) = Microthyrium pinophyllum, Microthyriaceae
- T. ugandense (Hansf.) S. Hughes (1953) = Trichothyrina ugandensis, Microthyriaceae
