= Cyclotheca =

Scientific classification
- Kingdom: Fungi
- Division: Ascomycota
- Class: Dothideomycetes
- Order: Microthyriales
- Family: Microthyriaceae
- Genus: Cyclotheca; Theiss. (1914)

Type species
- Cyclotheca miconiae (P.Syd.) Theiss. (1914)

Synonyms
- Hariotula G.Arnaud (1917); Synpeltis Syd. & P.Syd. (1917); Thyrosoma Syd. & P.Syd. (1921); Calopeltis Syd. (1925); Synostomella Syd. (1927); Seynesiospora Bat. (1960); Hugueninia J.L.Bezerra & T.T.Barros (1970)

Genus of fungi

Cyclotheca is a genus of fungi in the family Microthyriaceae.

== Species ==
As accepted by Species Fungorum;

- Cyclotheca batistae Arx (1960)
- Cyclotheca filici Hosag. & T.K.Abraham (1997)
- Cyclotheca freycinetiae (J.L.Bezerra & T.T.Barros) H.X.Wu & K.D.Hyde (2011)
- Cyclotheca iochromatis (Rehm) Arx (1962)
- Cyclotheca jasmini (Doidge) Arx (1962)
- Cyclotheca kamatii T.S.Viswan. & Ananthan. (1966)
- Cyclotheca licaniae Bat. & J.L.Bezerra (1964)
- Cyclotheca loranthi (P.Karst. & Har.) Arx (1962)
- Cyclotheca lucumae Bat. & O.M.Fonseca (1964)
- Cyclotheca melastomatis (Pat.) Arx (1958)
- Cyclotheca miconiae (Syd. & P.Syd.) Theiss. (1914)
- Cyclotheca microthyrioides Bat. & Peres (1962)
- Cyclotheca myodocarpi J.L.Bezerra & Poroca (1972)
- Cyclotheca nervicola (Petr.) Arx (1958)
- Cyclotheca pulchella (Syd. & P.Syd.) Arx (1962)
- Cyclotheca sordidula (Lév.) Arx (1962)
- Cyclotheca symploci M.S.Patil & Thite (1975)

Former species; Cyclotheca bosciae Doidge (1924) = Hysterostomella bosciae Parmulariaceae
