= A. australiensis =

A. australiensis may refer to:

- Actinomyxa australiensis, a species of fungi in the family Microthyriaceae
- Aeromonas australiensis, a species of Gram-negative, anaerobic bacterium in the family Aeromonadaceae
- Aglaia australiensis, a species of plant in the family Meliaceae
- Asperoseius australiensis, a species of mite in the family Phytoseiidae
- Astonia australiensis, a species of plant in the family Alismataceae
- Australentulus australiensis, a species of proturan in the family Acerentomidae
- Austrochernes australiensis, a species of pseudoscorpion in the family Chernetidae
