= Chaetothyriothecium =

Scientific classification
- Kingdom: Fungi
- Division: Ascomycota
- Class: Dothideomycetes
- Order: Microthyriales
- Family: Microthyriaceae
- Genus: Chaetothyriothecium; Hongsanan & K.D. Hyde, 2014

Species
- Chaetothyriothecium elegans Hongsanan & K.D. Hyde 2014

Genus of fungi

Chaetothyriothecium is a genus of fungi in the family Microthyriaceae.
