= Fusarium oxysporum f.sp. dianthi =

Scientific classification
- Domain: Eukaryota
- Kingdom: Fungi
- Division: Ascomycota
- Class: Sordariomycetes
- Order: Hypocreales
- Family: Nectriaceae
- Genus: Fusarium
- Species: F. oxysporum
- Forma specialis: F. o. f.sp. dianthi

Trionomial name
- Fusarium oxysporum f.sp. dianthi W.C. Snyder & H.N. Hansen, (1940)

Synonyms
- Fusarium dianthi Prill. & Delacr., (1899); Fusarium oxysporum f. dianthi (Prill. & Delacr.) W.C. Snyder & H.N. Hansen, (1940); Fusarium oxysporum var. dianthi (Prill. & Delacr.) Raillo, (1950)

Fungal plant pathogen

Fusarium oxysporum f.sp. dianthi is a fungal plant pathogen infecting carnations.
