= Seynesia =

Scientific classification
- Kingdom: Fungi
- Division: Ascomycota
- Class: Sordariomycetes
- Order: Xylariales
- Family: Xylariaceae
- Genus: Seynesia; Sacc.

Type species
- Seynesia nobilis (Welw. & Curr.) Sacc.

Genus of fungi

Seynesia is a genus of fungi in the family Cainiaceae.

The genus was circumscribed by Pier Andrea Saccardo in Syll. Fungorum vol.2 on page 668 in 1883.

The genus name of Seynesia is in honour of Jules de Seynes (1833–1912), who was a French physician, botanist and mycologist, and Professor of Natural history at the Medical faculty within the University of Paris. He previously also was at the University of Montpellier.

== Species ==
As accepted by Species Fungorum;

- Seynesia apuleiae Speg. (1912)
- Seynesia araucariae Rehm (1900)
- Seynesia banksiae Henn. (1903)
- Seynesia brosimicola J.A. Stev. (1943)
- Seynesia calamicola Henn. & E. Nyman (1899)
- Seynesia circinans (Speg.) Theiss. (1912)
- Seynesia coccoidea Henn. (1902)
- Seynesia cordiae R.W. Ryan (1924)
- Seynesia costaricensis Speg. (1918)
- Seynesia cynanchi Sawada & W. Yamam. (1959)
- Seynesia echitis (Allesch.) Theiss. (1912)
- Seynesia elegantula Syd. & P. Syd. (1910)
- Seynesia ficina Syd. & P. Syd. (1916)
- Seynesia fuscoparaphysata Henn. (1904)
- Seynesia juruana Henn. (1904)
- Seynesia licaniae Rehm (1909)
- Seynesia livistonae L.D. Guo & K.D. Hyde (2001)
- Seynesia hammariana Henn. (1902)
- Seynesia heteropteridis Theiss. (1910)
- Seynesia megas Rehm (1898)
- Seynesia melaleucae Hansf. (1957)
- Seynesia nobilis (Welw. & Curr.) Sacc. (1883)
- Seynesia oleae Sousa da Câmara & Luz (1939)
- Seynesia palmicola Bat., Cavalc. & J.O. Silva (1964)
- Seynesia petiolicola Henn. (1903)
- Seynesia santanderiana Toro (1934)
- Seynesia scutellum Syd. & P. Syd. (1910)

Former species;

- S. alstoniae Rehm (1914) = Arnaudiella alstoniae Ascomycota
- S. asterinoides (Pat.) Sacc. (1891) = Prillieuxina asterinoides Asterinaceae
- S. atkinsonii F. Stevens & R.W. Ryan (1925) = Kirschsteiniothelia atkinsonii Kirschsteiniotheliaceae
- S. australis Speg. (1887) = Asterostomella australis Asterinaceae
- S. balansae Speg. (1885) = Asterina balansae Asterinaceae
- S. brachystoma Rehm (1898) = Parasterina brachystoma Asterinaceae
- S. brasiliensis Speg. (1908) = Opasterinella brasiliensis Microthyriaceae
- S. caronae Pass. (1888) = Pycnoseynesia caronae Ascomycota
- S. chilensis Speg. (1910) = Seynesiola chilensis Microthyriaceae
- S. clavispora Rehm (1913) = Prillieuxina clavispora Asterinaceae
- S. coccolobae R.W. Ryan (1924) = Cocconia coccolobae Parmulariaceae
- S. drimydis (Lév.) Speg. (1910) = Leveillella drimydis Asterinaceae
- S. epidendri Rehm (1900) = Asterinella epidendri Microthyriaceae
- S. erumpens (Berk. & M.A. Curtis) Petr. (1927) = Astrosphaeriella erumpens Astrosphaeriellaceae
- S. eugeniae (Syd.) F. Stevens (1939) = Ferrarisia eugeniae Parmulariaceae
- S. grandis (Niessl) G. Winter (1886) = Palawania grandis Palawaniaceae
- S. guaranitica Speg. (1885) = Asterina guaranitica Asterinaceae
- S. humiriae Henn. (1905) = Prillieuxina humiriae Asterinaceae
- S. ilicina Syd. & P. Syd. (1909) = Dimerium ilicinum Parodiopsidaceae
- S. iochromatis (Rehm) Theiss. (1912) = Cyclotheca iochromatis Microthyriaceae
- S. ipomoeae Syd. & P. Syd. (1913) = Ferrarisia ipomoeae Parmulariaceae
- S. juniperi (Desm.) F. Stevens (1939) = Seynesiella juniperi Microthyriaceae
- S. marmellensis Henn. (1904) = Asterina marmellensis Asterinaceae
- S. megas var. macrospora Starbäck (1904) = Seynesia megas
- S. melastomataceae Henn. (1902) = Asterina melastomatacearum Asterinaceae
- S. microthyrioides (G. Winter) Theiss. (1913) = Phaeothyriolum microthyrioides Microthyriaceae
- S. montana (Racib.) Sacc. & Trotter (1913) = Trichopeltella montana Microthyriaceae
- S. nebulosa Speg. (1891) = Microthyrium nebulosum Microthyriaceae
- S. orbiculata Syd. & P. Syd. (1912) = Palawaniella orbiculata Parmulariaceae
- S. palustris (Sacc.) Petr. (1930) = Ceriophora palustris Amphisphaeriaceae
- S. polystachyae E. Castell. (1947) = Arnaudiella polystachyae Ascomycota
- S. schroeteri Rehm (1898) = Asterolibertia schroeteri Asterinaceae
- S. serrulata (Ellis & G. Martin) Petr. (1953) = Roussoella serrulata Roussoellaceae
- S. submegas Henn. (1904) = Asterina submegas Asterinaceae
