= Maublancia (fungus) =

Scientific classification
- Kingdom: Fungi
- Division: Ascomycota
- Class: Dothideomycetes
- Order: Microthyriales
- Family: Microthyriaceae
- Genus: Maublancia; G. Arnaud

Type species
- Maublancia myrtacearum G. Arnaud

Genus of fungi

Maublancia is a genus of fungi in the family Microthyriaceae.

The genus name of Maublancia is in honour of André Pierre Jules Maublanc (1880–1958), who was a French mycologist and plant pathologist.

The genus was circumscribed by Gabriel Arnaud in Ann. École Natl. Agric. Montpellier n.s. vol.16 on page 158 in 1918.

== Species ==
As accepted by Species Fungorum;

- Maublancia gaultheriae E. Müll. (1965)
- Maublancia indica Patw. & A.K. Pande (1968)
- Maublancia juruana (Henn.) G. Arnaud (1918)
- Maublancia myrtacearum G. Arnaud (1918)
- Maublancia raripoda (Doidge) Arx (1962)
- Maublancia trichocladii (Doidge) Arx (1962)
- Maublancia uleana (Pazschke) Arx (1962)
