= Muyocopron =

Scientific classification
- Kingdom: Fungi
- Division: Ascomycota
- Class: Dothideomycetes
- Order: Muyocopronales
- Family: Muyocopronaceae
- Genus: Muyocopron; Speg.

Genus of fungi

Muyocopron is a genus of fungi in the Muyocopronaceae family.

== Species ==
As accepted by Species Fungorum;

- Muyocopron affine Penz. & Sacc. (1898)
- Muyocopron alcornii Hern.-Restr., J.D.P. Bezerra & Y.P. Tan (2019)
- Muyocopron argentinense Speg. (1909)
- Muyocopron atromaculans (Bills & Polishook) Hern.-Restr., J.D.P. Bezerra & Crous (2019)
- Muyocopron bakerianum Rehm (1913)
- Muyocopron calamagrostidis Rostr. (1931)
- Muyocopron carissae A.K. Kar & Maity (1972)
- Muyocopron caseariae Speg. (1912)
- Muyocopron cassiicola Bat. & Gayão (1953)
- Muyocopron castanopsidis Mapook, Boonmee & K.D. Hyde (2016)
- Muyocopron celtidis Tennakoon, C.H. Kuo & K.D. Hyde (2021)
- Muyocopron chromolaenae Mapook & K.D. Hyde (2020)
- Muyocopron chromolaenicola Mapook & K.D. Hyde (2020)
- Muyocopron cinnamomi Marasinghe, C.H. Kuo & K.D. Hyde (2021)
- Muyocopron coloratum (Alcorn) Hern.-Restr., J.D.P. Bezerra & Crous (2019)
- Muyocopron conjunctum Syd. & P. Syd. (1914)
- Muyocopron corrientinum Speg. (1881)
- Muyocopron crustaceum Speg. (1885)
- Muyocopron cucurbitacearum Rehm (1900)
- Muyocopron dipterocarpi Mapook, Boonmee & K.D. Hyde (2016)
- Muyocopron eleocharidis Grove (1930)
- Muyocopron fagifolii Bat. & M.L. Farr (1960)
- Muyocopron ficinum Tennakoon, C.H. Kuo & K.D. Hyde (2021)
- Muyocopron freycinetiae (F. Stevens & R.W. Ryan) G. Arnaud (1931)
- Muyocopron freycineticola Hern.-Restr. & Crous (2019)
- Muyocopron garethjonesii Tibpromma, Karun. & K.D. Hyde (2016)
- Muyocopron geniculatum (Alcorn) Hern.-Restr., J.D.P. Bezerra & Crous (2019)
- Muyocopron guiscatrei Toro (1934)
- Muyocopron heveae Senwanna & K.D. Hyde (2019)
- Muyocopron hongkongense Joanne E. Taylor, K.D. Hyde & E.B.G. Jones (2003)
- Muyocopron indicum P.C. Gupta (1974)
- Muyocopron laterale (Alcorn & B. Sutton) Hern.-Restr., J.D.P. Bezerra & Crous (2019)
- Muyocopron lithocarpi Mapook, Boonmee & K.D. Hyde (2016)
- Muyocopron litorale Speg. (1921)
- Muyocopron manihoticola Chevaug. (1956)
- Muyocopron millepunctatum Penz. & Sacc. (1898)
- Muyocopron mucoris (Dilcher) Samarak. & K.D. Hyde (2019)
- Muyocopron neyveliensis (P.R. Reddy, Ramanujam & Srisailam) Samarak. & K.D. Hyde (2019)
- Muyocopron ovatisporum Katum. (1986)
- Muyocopron palmarum G. Winter (1885)
- Muyocopron pandani Höhn. (1920)
- Muyocopron parviflorae V.P. Sahni (1966)
- Muyocopron ramicola C. Moreau & M. Moreau (1951)
- Muyocopron sahnii Hern.-Restr. & Crous (2019)
- Muyocopron smilacis (De Not.) Sacc. (1883)
- Muyocopron smilaciscaule Bat. (1960)
- Muyocopron stigmatostalycis Henn. (1908)
- Muyocopron taiwanense (Matsush.) Hern.-Restr. & Crous (2019)
- Muyocopron tectum (G. Winter) Arx & E. Müll. (1954)
- Muyocopron thailandicum S. Hongsanan, N. Huanraluek & K. Thambugala (2020)
- Muyocopron umbilicatum Speg. (1918)
- Muyocopron vaccinii De Not. ex Sacc. (1883)
- Muyocopron valdivianum Speg. (1910)
- Muyocopron vanillae Av.-Saccá (1922)
- Muyocopron yerbae Speg. (1908)
- Muyocopron zamiae Hern.-Restr. & Crous (2019)

Former species;

- M. baccarum (Rehm) Sacc. (1883) = Microthyrium baccarum, Microthyriaceae
- M. denudans Rehm (1903) = Stegothyrium denudans, Microthyriaceae
- M. euryae Racib. (1909) = Phyllachora euryae, Phyllachoraceae
- M. fecundum Sacc. (1893) = Dictyothyrina fecunda, Micropeltidaceae
- M. fecundum var. atrocyaneum Starbäck (1899) = Dictyothyrina atrocyanea, Micropeltidaceae
- M. flageoletianum (Sacc.) Höhn. (1915) = Nitschkia flageoletiana, Nitschkiaceae
- M. granulatum (Berk. & Broome) Sacc. (1883) = Trabutia granulata, Phyllachoraceae
- M. hederae (Feltgen) F. Stevens (1939) = Microthyrium hederae, Microthyriaceae
- M. ilicinum (De Not.) Sacc. (1883) = Microthyrium ilicinum, Microthyriaceae
- M. ramulare (Ellis) Speg. (1912) = Microdothella ramularis, Dothideomycetes
- M. umbilicatum var. rubi A.K. Kar & Maity (1972) = Muyocopron umbilicatum, Muyocopronaceae
