= Asterinella =

Scientific classification
- Kingdom: Fungi
- Division: Ascomycota
- Class: Dothideomycetes
- Order: Microthyriales
- Family: Microthyriaceae
- Genus: Asterinella; Theiss.

Type species
- Asterinella puiggarii (Speg.) Theiss.

Genus of fungi

Asterinella is a genus of fungi in the Microthyriaceae family. It is commonly found on decaying leaves or dead plants.

== Species ==
As accepted by Species Fungorum;

- Asterinella bangii Petr. (1947)
- Asterinella brasiliensis (G. Winter) Theiss. (1912)
- Asterinella bredemeyerae Garcés (1944)
- Asterinella caaguazensis (Speg.) Theiss. (1912)
- Asterinella caricifoliicola (I. Hino & Katum.) Katum. (1975)
- Asterinella clemensiae Petr. (1959)
- Asterinella contorta (Doidge) Hansf. (1946)
- Asterinella cupressina (Rehm) Theiss. (1912)
- Asterinella diospyrina Hansf. (1957)
- Asterinella entebbeensis Hansf. (1946)
- Asterinella epidendri (Rehm) Theiss. (1912)
- Asterinella evigilata Bat. & Peres (1961)
- Asterinella formosana W. Yamam. (1957)
- Asterinella hapala Syd. (1934)
- Asterinella hiugensis I. Hino & Hidaka (1934)
- Asterinella intensa (Cooke & Massee) Theiss. (1912)
- Asterinella ixorae R.W. Ryan (1924)
- Asterinella leptotheca (Speg.) Theiss. (1912)
- Asterinella lugubris Syd. & P. Syd. (1913)
- Asterinella mimusopis Doidge (1922)
- Asterinella mindanaensis Syd. (1923)
- Asterinella palawanensis Syd. & P. Syd. (1914)
- Asterinella papayae Gonz. Frag. & Cif. (1926)
- Asterinella parameriae Petr. (1931)
- Asterinella phoradendri (Henn.) Theiss. (1912)
- Asterinella protiicola Bat. (1961)
- Asterinella pseudospondiadis Hansf. (1945)
- Asterinella pterigotae Hosag. & T.K. Abraham (1998)
- Asterinella puiggarii (Speg.) Theiss. (1912)
- Asterinella puyana Petr. (1950)
- Asterinella quinta Racib. ex Theiss. (1912)
- Asterinella randiae Hansf. (1947)
- Asterinella stuhlmannii (Henn.) Theiss. (1912)
- Asterinella tecleae Doidge (1942)
- Asterinella ugandensis Hansf. (1941)

Former species; Assume if not mentioned, all species are in the Asterinaceae family

- A. acokantherae Doidge (1920) = Lembosina acokantherae, Lembosinaceae
- A. amazonica Syd. & P. Syd. (1916) = Prillieuxina amazonica
- A. anamirtae Syd. & P. Syd. (1914) = Prillieuxina anamirtae
- A. antioquensis Toro (1930) = Asterina antioquensis
- A. ardisiae Hansf. (1954) = Prillieuxina ardisiae
- A. argyreiae Hosag., M.P. Balakr. & Goos (1996) = Prillieuxina argyreiae
- A. asterinoides (Pat.) Theiss. (1912) = Prillieuxina asterinoides
- A. baileyi (Berk. & Broome) Petr. (1954) = Placoasterella baileyi
- A. burchelliae Doidge (1920) = Asterolibertia burchelliae
- A. calami Syd. & P. Syd. (1914) = Prillieuxina calami
- A. capizensis J.M. Mend. (1932) = Prillieuxina capizensis
- A. conocephali Hansf. (1954) = Prillieuxina conocephali
- A. creberrima Syd. & P. Syd. (1917) = Prillieuxina creberrima
- A. cryptocaryae (Cooke) Theiss. (1912) = Asterolibertia cryptocaryae
- A. cylindrotheca (Speg.) Theiss. (1912) = Prillieuxina cylindrotheca
- A. diaphana (Syd. & P. Syd.) Theiss. (1912) = Prillieuxina diaphana
- A. dipteridis Hansf. (1954) = Prillieuxina dipteridis
- A. dipterocarpi Syd. & P. Syd. (1914) = Prillieuxina dipterocarpi
- A. dissiliens Syd. (1924) = Prillieuxina dissiliens
- A. distinguenda Syd. & P. Syd. (1913) = Prillieuxina distinguenda
- A. drimydis (Lév.) Speg. (1921) = Leveillella drimydis
- A. dysoxyli Syd. (1931) = Prillieuxina dysoxyli
- A. elaeagni Syd. & P. Syd. (1920) = Asterina elaeagni
- A. flexuosa (G. Winter) Theiss. (1912) = Prillieuxina flexuosa
- A. gmelinae (Sacc.) Trotter (1926) = Asterina gmelinae
- A. gracilis Syd. & P. Syd. (1914) = Prillieuxina gracilis
- A. hippeastri R.W. Ryan (1924) = Prillieuxina hippeastri
- A. humiriae (Henn.) Theiss. (1912) = Prillieuxina humiriae
- A. hydnocarpi H.S. Yates (1917) = Prillieuxina hydnocarpi
- A. ilicicola Hansf. (1954) = Prillieuxina ilicicola
- A. inconspicua (Doidge) Hansf. (1948) = Prillieuxina inconspicua
- A. ixoricola S. Hughes (1952) = Prillieuxina ixoricola
- A. jasmini Hosag. & T.K. Abraham (1997) = Prillieuxina jasmini
- A. lembosioides Doidge (1920) = Echidnodes lembosioides
- A. lepidotricha Theiss. (1916) = Prillieuxina lepidotricha
- A. loranthi Syd. & P. Syd. (1913) = Prillieuxina loranthi
- A. luzonensis Syd. & P. Syd. (1913) = Prillieuxina luzonensis
- A. mabae F. Stevens & R.W. Ryan (1925) = Prillieuxina mabae
- A. malabarensis (Syd. & P. Syd.) Theiss. (1912) = Lembosia malabarensis
- A. manaosensis (Henn.) Theiss. (1912) = Prillieuxina manaosensis
- A. melastomacearum R.W. Ryan (1924) = Prillieuxina melastomacearum
- A. microchita Syd. (1928) = Prillieuxina microchita
- A. multilobata (G. Winter) Theiss. (1912) = Prillieuxina multilobata
- A. nebulosa (Speg.) Theiss. (1912) = Microthyrium nebulosum, Microthyriaceae
- A. obesa Syd. & P. Syd. (1913) = Prillieuxina obesa
- A. phoradendri R.W. Ryan (1924) = Prillieuxina phoradendri
- A. pinastri (Fuckel) S. Ahmad (1969) = Stomiopeltis pinastri, Micropeltidaceae
- A. pterocelastri Doidge (1924) = Prillieuxina pterocelastri
- A. puiggarii var. minor Bat. & Peres (1961) = Asterinella puiggarii, Microthyriaceae
- A. ramuligera Syd. & P. Syd. (1914) = Asterina ramuligera
- A. rhaphiostylidis S. Hughes (1953) = Prillieuxina rhaphiostylidis
- A. saginata Syd. & P. Syd. (1917) = Prillieuxina saginata
- A. santiriae Syd. & P. Syd. (1917) = Asterolibertia santiriae
- A. sublibera (Berk.) Theiss. (1912) = Asterina sublibera
- A. systema-solare (Massee) Theiss. (1912) = Dothidasteromella systema-solare
- A. tetracerae Hansf. (1954) = Prillieuxina tetracerae
- A. tjibodensis Höhn. (1920) = Prillieuxina tjibodensis
- A. uleana (Pazschke) Theiss. (1912) = Maublancia uleana, Microthyriaceae
- A. venusta Syd. & P. Syd. (1920) = Prillieuxina venusta
- A. winteriana (Pazschke) Theiss. (1912) = Prillieuxina winteriana
- A. woodiana Doidge (1920) = Asterina woodiana
