= Ferdinand Theissen =

German-Austrian Jesuit priest and mycologist

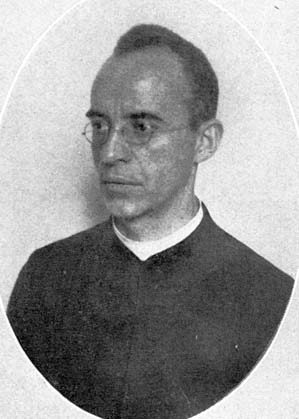
Ferdinand Theissen

Ferdinand Theissen (27 July 1877 in Krefeld – 5 September 1919) was a German-Austrian Jesuit priest and mycologist.

He studied theology at the seminary in Feldkirch, then from 1902 to 1908 was stationed in São Leopoldo, Brazil. Following his return to Europe he continued his studies in Valkenburg and Innsbruck, and in 1914 returned to Feldkirch as a schoolteacher. He died in September 1919 as a result of a climbing accident during a collection excursion in the Vorarlberg Alps.

He was the author or co-author of numerous mycological taxa; with Hans Sydow he co-described the families Botryosphaeriaceae, Dothioraceae, Phyllachoraceae and Polystomellaceae. The genus Theissenia was named after him by André Maublanc (1914).

== Selected writings ==
- Fragmenta brasilica (5 parts, 1908–12) in Annales Mycologici.
- Die Hypocreaceen von Rio Grande do Sul, Südbrasilien (1911) in Annales Mycologici – Hypocreaceae of Rio Grande do Sul, southern Brazil.
- Decades Fungorum Brasiliensium, (1910–12). It is an exsiccata-like series with specimens nos. 1-300 distributed between 1910 and 1912.
- Fungi Austro-Americani exsiccati (? 1911). It is an exsiccata with specimens nos. 301-360 edited together with Johannes Rick.
- Le genre Asterinella (1912) – The genus Asterinella.
- Zur Revision der Gattungen Microthyrium und Seynesia (1912–13) in Österreichische Botanische Zeitschrift – Revision of the genera Microthyrium and Seynesia.
- Lembosia-Studien (1913) – Lembosia studies.
- Dothideazeen-Studien (2 parts, 1914; with Hans Sydow) in Annales Mycologici – Dothideaceae studies.
- Die Dothideales. Kritisch-systematisch Originaluntersuchungen (1915; with Hans Sydow) in Annales Mycologici – The Dothideales.
- Studie über Botryosphaeria (1916) in Annales Mycologici – Studies of the genus Botryosphaeria.
- Die Gattung Parodiella, (1917) in Annales Mycologici – The genus Parodiella.
