= Prillieuxina =

Scientific classification
- Kingdom: Fungi
- Division: Ascomycota
- Class: Dothideomycetes
- Order: Asterinales
- Family: Asterinaceae
- Genus: Prillieuxina; G. Arnaud

Type species
- Prillieuxina winteriana (Pazschke) G. Arnaud

Genus of fungi

Prillieuxina is a genus of fungi in the Asterinaceae family. The relationship of this taxon to other taxa within the class is unknown (incertae sedis), and it has not yet been placed with certainty into any order.

The genus name of Prillieuxina is in honour of Édouard Ernest Prillieux (1829–1915), who was a French botanist and agronomist known for his work with plant diseases.

The genus was circumscribed by Gabriel Arnaud in Ann. École Natl. Agric. Montpellier ser.2, vol.16 on pages 161–162 in 1918.

== Species ==
As accepted by Species Fungorum;

- Prillieuxina amazonica (Syd. & P. Syd.) R.W. Ryan (1939)
- Prillieuxina amboinensis Syd. (1922)
- Prillieuxina anamirtae (Syd. & P. Syd.) R.W. Ryan (1939)
- Prillieuxina aquifoliacearum Hosag., K. Ravik. & Archana (2007)
- Prillieuxina ardisiae (Hansf.) Arx (1962)
- Prillieuxina argyreiae (Hosag., M.P. Balakr. & Goos) Hosag. (2012)
- Prillieuxina asterinoides (Pat.) R.W. Ryan (1939)
- Prillieuxina baccharidincola (Rehm) Petr. (1950)
- Prillieuxina calami (Syd. & P. Syd.) R.W. Ryan (1939)
- Prillieuxina calotheca (Pat.) R.W. Ryan (1939)
- Prillieuxina capizensis (J.M. Mend.) R.W. Ryan (1939)
- Prillieuxina cinchonae J.A. Stev. (1943)
- Prillieuxina citricola A.K. Gautam & S. Avasthi (2016)
- Prillieuxina clavispora (Rehm) R.W. Ryan (1939)
- Prillieuxina conocephali (Hansf.) Arx (1962)
- Prillieuxina creberrima (Syd. & P. Syd.) Arx (1962)
- Prillieuxina cylindrotheca (Speg.) R.W. Ryan (1939)
- Prillieuxina diaphana (Syd. & P. Syd.) R.W. Ryan (1939)
- Prillieuxina dichapetali Lonkar, Patil & Salunkhe (2018)
- Prillieuxina diospyri Hosag. & Chandrapr. (2009)
- Prillieuxina dipteridis (Hansf.) Arx (1962)
- Prillieuxina dipterocarpi (Syd. & P. Syd.) R.W. Ryan (1939)
- Prillieuxina dissiliens (Syd.) Arx (1962)
- Prillieuxina distinguenda (Syd. & P. Syd.) R.W. Ryan (1939)
- Prillieuxina dysoxyli (Syd.) Arx (1962)
- Prillieuxina elaeagni Hosag. & C.K. Biju (2004)
- Prillieuxina flexuosa (G. Winter) R.W. Ryan (1939)
- Prillieuxina garciniae Hosag. (2004)
- Prillieuxina gracilis (Syd. & P. Syd.) Arx (1962)
- Prillieuxina hippeastri (R.W. Ryan) Arx (1962)
- Prillieuxina hiugensis Katum. (1975)
- Prillieuxina humboldtiae Hosag., Thimm. & Archana (2013)
- Prillieuxina humiriae (Henn.) R.W. Ryan (1939)
- Prillieuxina hydnocarpi (H.S. Yates) Arx (1962)
- Prillieuxina ilicicola (Hansf.) Arx (1962)
- Prillieuxina inconspicua (Doidge) Arx (1962)
- Prillieuxina ixorae (R.W. Ryan) R.W. Ryan (1939)
- Prillieuxina ixoricola (S. Hughes) Arx (1962)
- Prillieuxina ixorigena Hosag. & Chandrapr. (2009)
- Prillieuxina jasmini (Hosag. & T.K. Abraham) Hosag. (2011)
- Prillieuxina lepidotricha (Theiss.) R.W. Ryan (1939)
- Prillieuxina loranthi (Syd. & P. Syd.) Syd. (1922)
- Prillieuxina luzonensis (Syd. & P. Syd.) R.W. Ryan (1939)
- Prillieuxina mabae (F. Stevens & R.W. Ryan) R.W. Ryan (1939)
- Prillieuxina manaosensis (Henn.) R.W. Ryan (1939)
- Prillieuxina melastomacearum (R.W. Ryan) R.W. Ryan (1939)
- Prillieuxina microchita (Syd.) Arx (1962)
- Prillieuxina multilobata (G. Winter) R.W. Ryan (1939)
- Prillieuxina obesa (Syd. & P. Syd.) Arx (1962)
- Prillieuxina pavettae Hosag. & Sabeena (2013)
- Prillieuxina phoradendri R.W. Ryan (1939)
- Prillieuxina polyalthiae Hosag. & T.K. Abraham (1999)
- Prillieuxina pterocelastri (Doidge) R.W. Ryan (1939)
- Prillieuxina pumila Syd. (1925)
- Prillieuxina rhaphiostylidis (S. Hughes) Arx (1962)
- Prillieuxina saginata (Syd. & P. Syd.) R.W. Ryan (1939)
- Prillieuxina sinensis Petr. (1947)
- Prillieuxina tarennae Hosag., Dhivah. & Nithyath. (2012)
- Prillieuxina tetracerae (Hansf.) Arx (1962)
- Prillieuxina tjibodensis (Höhn.) R.W. Ryan (1939)
- Prillieuxina venusta (Syd. & P. Syd.) R.W. Ryan (1939)
- Prillieuxina winteriana (Pazschke) G. Arnaud (1918)

Former species;

- P. acokantherae (Doidge) R.W. Ryan (1939) = Lembosina acokantherae, Lembosinaceae
- P. antioquensis (Toro) R.W. Ryan (1939) = Asterina antioquensis, Asterinaceae
- P. burchelliae (Doidge) R.W. Ryan (1939) = Asterolibertia burchelliae, Asterinaceae
- P. cryptocaryae (Cooke) R.W. Ryan (1939) = Asterolibertia cryptocaryae, Asterinaceae
- P. intensa (Cooke & Massee) R.W. Ryan (1939) = Asterinella intensa, Microthyriaceae
- P. malabarensis (Syd. & P. Syd.) R.W. Ryan (1939) = Lembosia malabarensis, Asterinaceae
- P. microspila Syd. (1922) = Trichasterina microspila, Asterinaceae
- P. mimusopis (Doidge) R.W. Ryan (1939) = Asterinella mimusopis, Microthyriaceae
- P. parameriae (Petr.) Arx (1962) = Asterinella parameriae, Microthyriaceae
- P. quinta (Racib.) R.W. Ryan (1939) = Asterina quarta, Asterinaceae
- P. ramuligera (Syd. & P. Syd.) R.W. Ryan (1939) = Asterina ramuligera, Asterinaceae
- P. santiriae (Syd. & P. Syd.) R.W. Ryan (1939) = Asterolibertia santiriae, Asterinaceae
- P. stuhlmannii (Henn.) Arx (1962) = Asterinella stuhlmannii, Microthyriaceae
- P. systema-solare (Massee) R.W. Ryan (1939) = Dothidasteromella systema-solare, Asterinaceae
- P. tecleae (Doidge) Arx (1962) = Asterinella tecleae, Microthyriaceae
- P. woodiana (Doidge) R.W. Ryan (1939) = Asterina woodiana, Asterinaceae
