= Chaetothyriothecium elegans =

Scientific classification
- Kingdom: Fungi
- Division: Ascomycota
- Class: Dothideomycetes
- Order: Microthyriales
- Family: Microthyriaceae
- Genus: Chaetothyriothecium
- Species: C. elegans

Binomial name
- Chaetothyriothecium elegans Hongsanan & K.D. Hyde, 2014

Species of fungus

Chaetothyriothecium elegans is a species of fungus in the family Microthyriaceae. It is found in central Thailand.
