= Seynesiella =

Scientific classification
- Kingdom: Fungi
- Division: Ascomycota
- Class: Dothideomycetes
- Order: Microthyriales
- Family: Microthyriaceae
- Genus: Seynesiella; G. Arnaud

Type species
- Seynesiella juniperi (Desm.) G. Arnaud

Genus of fungi

Seynesiella is a genus of fungi in the Microthyriaceae family.

The genus was circumscribed by Gabriel Arnaud in Ann. École Natl. Agric. Montpellier ser.2, vol.16 on pages 202-203 in 1918.

The genus name of Seynesiella is in honour of Jules de Seynes (1833–1912), who was a French physician, botanist and mycologist, and Professor of Natural history at the Medical faculty within the University of Paris. He previously also was at the University of Montpellier.

== Species ==
As accepted by Species Fungorum;

- Seynesiella exigua M.E. Barr (1969)
- Seynesiella juniperi (Desm.) G. Arnaud (1918)
- Seynesiella melaleucae Sivan. & R.G. Shivas (2002)
- Seynesiella sequoiae (Cooke & Harkn.) E. Müll. (1962)
- Seynesiella syzygii Sivan. & R.G. Shivas (2002)
