= Calothyriopsis =

Scientific classification
- Kingdom: Fungi
- Division: Ascomycota
- Class: Dothideomycetes
- Order: Microthyriales
- Family: Microthyriaceae
- Genus: Calothyriopsis; Höhn.

Type species
- Calothyriopsis conferta (Theiss.) Höhn.

Genus of fungi

Calothyriopsis is a genus of fungi in the Microthyriaceae family.

== Species ==
As accepted by Species Fungorum;

- Calothyriopsis conferta (Theiss.) Höhn. (1919)
- Calothyriopsis mali Subhedar & V.G. Rao (1980)
- Calothyriopsis pouteriae Bat. & Cavalc. (1967)
- Calothyriopsis roupalae (Syd.) Arx (1962)
