= Polycyclinopsis =

Scientific classification
- Kingdom: Fungi
- Division: Ascomycota
- Class: Dothideomycetes
- Order: Microthyriales
- Family: Microthyriaceae
- Genus: Polycyclinopsis; Bat., A.F. Vital & I.H. Lima

Type species
- Polycyclinopsis solani Bat., A.F. Vital & I.H. Lima

Genus of fungi

Polycyclinopsis is a genus of fungi in the Microthyriaceae family. This is a monotypic genus, containing the single species Polycyclinopsis solani.
