= Arnaudiella =

Scientific classification
- Kingdom: Fungi
- Division: Ascomycota
- Class: Dothideomycetes
- Order: Microthyriales
- Family: Microthyriaceae
- Genus: Arnaudiella; Petr.

Type species
- Arnaudiella caronae (Pass.) Petr.

Genus of fungi

Arnaudiella is a genus of fungi in the Microthyriaceae family.
