= Trichothyrinula =

Scientific classification
- Kingdom: Fungi
- Division: Ascomycota
- Class: Dothideomycetes
- Order: Microthyriales
- Family: Microthyriaceae
- Genus: Trichothyrinula; Petr.

Type species
- Trichothyrinula sydowii Petr.

Genus of fungi

Trichothyrinula is a genus of fungi in the Microthyriaceae family.

== Species ==
As accepted by Species Fungorum;

- Trichothyrinula petrakii (Cif.) Arx (1962)
- Trichothyrinula sydowii Petr. (1950)
