= Trichopeltospora =

Scientific classification
- Kingdom: Fungi
- Division: Ascomycota
- Class: Dothideomycetes
- Order: Microthyriales
- Family: Microthyriaceae
- Genus: Trichopeltospora; Bat. & Cif.

Type species
- Trichopeltospora pipericola Bat., Cif. & C.A.A. Costa

Genus of fungi

Trichopeltospora is a genus of fungi in the Microthyriaceae family; according to the 2007 Outline of Ascomycota, the placement in this family is uncertain.

== Species ==
As accepted by Species Fungorum;

- Trichopeltospora pipericola Bat., Cif. & C.A.A. Costa (1958)
- Trichopeltospora reticulata Bat., J.L. Bezerra & Valle (1967)

Former species;

- T. pipericola var. elongata Bat., Cif. & C.A.A. Costa (1957) = Trichopeltospora pipericola
- T. pipericola var. minospora Bat. & Peres (1967)= Trichopeltospora pipericola
