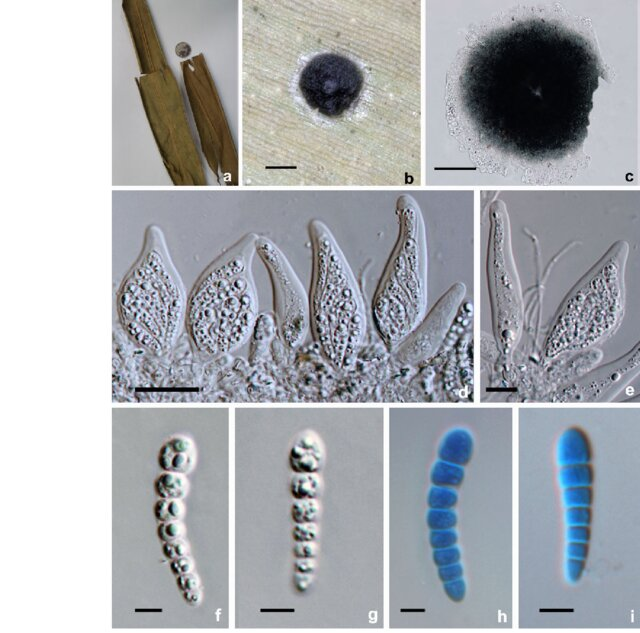
- Scolecopeltidium menglaense: a Host leaves. b Ascoma on leaf surface. c Squash mount of ascoma. d, e Ascus with paraphyses. f, g Ascospores. h, i Ascospores mounted in cotton blue reagent. Scale bars b = 200 lm, c = 100 lm, d = 20 lm, e = 10 lm, fi = 5 lm

Scientific classification
- Kingdom: Fungi
- Division: Ascomycota
- Class: Dothideomycetes
- Family: Micropeltidaceae
- Genus: Scolecopeltidium; F. Stevens & Manter

= Scolecopeltidium =

Genus of fungi

Scolecopeltidium is a genus of fungi in the Microthyriaceae family; according to the 2007 Outline of Ascomycota, the placement in this family is uncertain.

== Species ==
As accepted by Species Fungorum;

- Scolecopeltidium allophyli Bat. & I.H. Lima (1959)
- Scolecopeltidium amazonense Bat. & R. Garnier (1961)
- Scolecopeltidium anthurii Bat. & I.H. Lima (1959)
- Scolecopeltidium batistae R. Garnier & O.M. Fonseca (1963)
- Scolecopeltidium cabraliae Bat. & I.H. Lima (1959)
- Scolecopeltidium campomanesiae Bat. & I.H. Lima (1959)
- Scolecopeltidium caseariae Bat. (1959)
- Scolecopeltidium caseariicola Bat. & I.H. Lima (1959)
- Scolecopeltidium cassiae Bat. (1959)
- Scolecopeltidium cestri (Toro) Bat. (1959)
- Scolecopeltidium chamissoanae Bat. & I.H. Lima (1959)
- Scolecopeltidium chardonii (Toro) Bat. (1959)
- Scolecopeltidium coffeae Bat. & I.H. Lima (1959)
- Scolecopeltidium coloratum Bat. & I.H. Lima (1959)
- Scolecopeltidium connaraceaefolii Bat. & I.H. Lima (1959)
- Scolecopeltidium connari (Syd. & P. Syd.) F. Stevens & Manter (1925)
- Scolecopeltidium connarusii Bat. & I.H. Lima (1959)
- Scolecopeltidium cordiae Bat. & I.H. Lima (1959)
- Scolecopeltidium crotonis Bat. & I.H. Lima (1959)
- Scolecopeltidium cupaniae Bat. & I.H. Lima (1959)
- Scolecopeltidium cupaniicola Bat. & I.H. Lima (1959)
- Scolecopeltidium cupaniifolium Bat. & Peres (1961)
- Scolecopeltidium daphnopsidis Bat. & I.H. Lima (1959)
- Scolecopeltidium delitescens (Bat.) Bat. (1959)
- Scolecopeltidium djalmae Bat. & Peres (1961)
- Scolecopeltidium duckei Bat. & S.K. Shome (1961)
- Scolecopeltidium erythroxyli Bat. & I.H. Lima (1959)
- Scolecopeltidium eschweilerae Bat. (1959)
- Scolecopeltidium eugeniae (Doidge) Bat. (1959)
- Scolecopeltidium garciniae (Henn.) F. Stevens & Manter (1925)
- Scolecopeltidium guaduae (Henn.) F. Stevens & Manter (1925)
- Scolecopeltidium guettardae (Henn.) F. Stevens & Manter (1925)
- Scolecopeltidium guttulatum Bat. & I.H. Lima (1959)
- Scolecopeltidium hormosporum F. Stevens & Manter (1925)
- Scolecopeltidium imbe Bat. & I.H. Lima (1959)
- Scolecopeltidium imbeanum Bat. & I.H. Lima (1959)
- Scolecopeltidium ingae (Toro) Bat. (1959)
- Scolecopeltidium ingicola Bat. & I.H. Lima (1959)
- Scolecopeltidium ionopsidis (Toro) Bat. (1959)
- Scolecopeltidium landolphiae Bat. (1959)
- Scolecopeltidium lantanae Bat. & I.H. Lima (1959)
- Scolecopeltidium maranhense Bat. & Cavalc. (1967)
- Scolecopeltidium mayteni Bat. & I.H. Lima (1959)
- Scolecopeltidium menglaense H.X. Wu, X.Y. Zeng & K.D. Hyde (2019)
- Scolecopeltidium mirabile F. Stevens & Manter (1925)
- Scolecopeltidium myrsines (Doidge) Bat. (1959)
- Scolecopeltidium myrtacearum Bat. & O.M. Fonseca (1961)
- Scolecopeltidium nectandrae Bat. & I.H. Lima (1959)
- Scolecopeltidium neeae Bat. & I.H. Lima (1959)
- Scolecopeltidium paypayrolae Bat. (1959)
- Scolecopeltidium pedunculatum Bat. & I.H. Lima (1959)
- Scolecopeltidium perae Bat. (1954)
- Scolecopeltidium pernambucense (Bat.) Bat. (1959)
- Scolecopeltidium philodendricola Bat. & I.H. Lima (1959)
- Scolecopeltidium pithecellobiifolii Bat. & I.H. Lima (1959)
- Scolecopeltidium praeclarum Bat. & I.H. Lima (1959)
- Scolecopeltidium protiicola Bat. (1954)
- Scolecopeltidium protiifolii Bat. & S.K. Shome (1961)
- Scolecopeltidium psidii (Bat.) Bat. (1959)
- Scolecopeltidium racemosae Bat. & I.H. Lima (1959)
- Scolecopeltidium rosacearum Bat. & Cavalc. (1963)
- Scolecopeltidium saccoglottidis Bat. & I.H. Lima (1959)
- Scolecopeltidium salacense (Racib.) F. Stevens & Manter (1925)
- Scolecopeltidium salaciae Bat. & O.M. Fonseca (1961)
- Scolecopeltidium sapindi Bat. (1959)
- Scolecopeltidium serjaniae Bat. (1959)
- Scolecopeltidium smilacis Bat. (1959)
- Scolecopeltidium strauchii (Doidge) Bat. (1959)
- Scolecopeltidium swartziae (Bat. & Gayão) Bat. (1959)
- Scolecopeltidium swartzianum Bat. & I.H. Lima (1959)
- Scolecopeltidium tabernaemontanae Bat. (1959)
- Scolecopeltidium thiloae Bat. & I.H. Lima (1959)
- Scolecopeltidium thiloicola Bat. & I.H. Lima (1959)
- Scolecopeltidium vermiforme Bat. & Cavalc. (1967)
- Scolecopeltidium wangtianshuiense H.X. Wu, X.Y. Zeng & K.D. Hyde (2019)
- Scolecopeltidium xylopiae (Bat. & Gayão) Bat. (1959)

Former species;

- S. bakeri F. Stevens & Manter (1925) = Micropeltis bakeri, Micropeltidaceae
- S. costi F. Stevens & Manter (1925) = Micropeltis costi, Micropeltidaceae
- S. liciniae F. Stevens & Manter (1925) = Scolecopeltis liciniae, Micropeltidaceae
- S. multiseptatum F. Stevens & Manter (1925) = Micropeltis multiseptata, Micropeltidaceae
- S. transiens (Höhn.) Bat. (1959) = Scolecopeltis transiens, Micropeltidaceae
- S. xylopiae var. crassum Bat. & J.L. Bezerra (1962) = Scolecopeltidium xylopiae
