= Trichopeltum =

Scientific classification
- Kingdom: Fungi
- Division: Ascomycota
- Class: Dothideomycetes
- Order: Microthyriales
- Family: Microthyriaceae
- Genus: Trichopeltum; Bat., Cif. & C.A.A. Costa

Type species
- Trichopeltum hawaiiense Bat. & C.A.A. Costa

Genus of fungi

Trichopeltum is a genus of fungi in the Microthyriaceae family; according to the 2007 Outline of Ascomycota, the placement in this family is uncertain.

== Species ==
As accepted by Species Fungorum;

- Trichopeltum africanum Bat. & Marasas (1966)
- Trichopeltum carissae (Doidge) Marasas (1966)
- Trichopeltum hawaiiense Bat. & C.A.A. Costa (1958)
- Trichopeltum kentaniense (Doidge) Marasas (1966)
