= Asteronia =

Scientific classification
- Kingdom: Fungi
- Division: Ascomycota
- Class: Dothideomycetes
- Order: Microthyriales
- Family: Microthyriaceae
- Genus: Asteronia (Sacc.) P. Henn.

Type species
- Asteronia sweetiae Henn.

Genus of fungi

Asteronia is a genus of fungi in the Microthyriaceae family.

Species as accepted by Species Fungorum;

- Asteronia lauraceae Henn. (1908)
- Asteronia africana Henn. (1895)

Former species;

- Asteronia appendiculosa (Mont. & Berk.) Mont. ex Theiss. & Syd. (1926) = Vizella appendiculosa, Vizellaceae
- Asteronia erysiphoides (Kalchbr. & Cooke) Trotter (1926) = Asterostomella erysiphoides, Asterinaceae
