= Caudella =

Scientific classification
- Kingdom: Fungi
- Division: Ascomycota
- Class: Dothideomycetes
- Order: Microthyriales
- Family: Microthyriaceae
- Genus: Caudella; Syd. & P. Syd.

Type species
- Caudella oligotricha Syd. & P. Syd.

Genus of fungi

Caudella is a genus of fungi in the Microthyriaceae family.

== Species ==
As accepted by Species Fungorum;

- Caudella bipolaris O.L. Pereira (2006)
- Caudella gordoniae Hosag. & Goos (1996)
- Caudella oligotricha Syd. & P. Syd. (1916)
- Caudella psidii R.W. Ryan (1924)
