= Phaeothyriolum =

Scientific classification
- Kingdom: Fungi
- Division: Ascomycota
- Class: Dothideomycetes
- Order: Microthyriales
- Family: Microthyriaceae
- Genus: Phaeothyriolum; Syd.

Type species
- Phaeothyriolum eucalyptinum Syd.

Genus of fungi

Phaeothyriolum is a genus of fungi in the Microthyriaceae family.

== Species ==
As accepted by Species Fungorum;

- Phaeothyriolum amygdalinum (Cooke & Massee) Crous & Carnegie (2019)
- Phaeothyriolum corymbiae (Crous) Crous (2019)
- Phaeothyriolum dunnii Crous & Carnegie (2019)
- Phaeothyriolum eucalyptinum Syd. (1938)
- Phaeothyriolum eucalyptorum (Crous & W.B. Kendr.) Crous (2019)
- Phaeothyriolum microthyrioides (G. Winter) H.J. Swart (1986)
- Phaeothyriolum smilacis Matta (1960)
