= Govindua =

Scientific classification
- Kingdom: Fungi
- Division: Ascomycota
- Class: Dothideomycetes
- Order: Microthyriales
- Family: Microthyriaceae
- Genus: Govindua; Bat. & H. Maia

Type species
- Govindua shoreae Bat. & H. Maia

Genus of fungi

Govindua is a genus of fungi in the Microthyriaceae family. This is a monotypic genus, containing the single species Govindua shoreae.
