= Phragmaspidium =

Scientific classification
- Kingdom: Fungi
- Division: Ascomycota
- Class: Dothideomycetes
- Order: Microthyriales
- Family: Microthyriaceae
- Genus: Phragmaspidium; Bat.

Type species
- Phragmaspidium corruscans (Rehm) Bat.

Genus of fungi

Phragmaspidium is a genus of fungi in the Microthyriaceae family.

== Species ==
As accepted by Species Fungorum;

- Phragmaspidium corruscans (Rehm) Bat. (1960)
- Phragmaspidium manaosense (Henn.) Bat. (1960)
- Phragmaspidium viniferae Bat. (1960)
