= Resendea =

Scientific classification
- Kingdom: Fungi
- Division: Ascomycota
- Class: Dothideomycetes
- Order: Microthyriales
- Family: Microthyriaceae
- Genus: Resendea; Bat.

Type species
- Resendea paraguayensis Bat.

Genus of fungi

Resendea is a genus of fungi in the Microthyriaceae family; according to the 2007 Outline of Ascomycota, the placement in this family is uncertain.

The genus name of Resendea is in honour of Flávio (Ferreira) Pinto de Resende (1907–1967), who was a Portuguese botanist, Professor of Botany at the University of Lisbon and also director of the University’s Botanical Garden.

The genus was circumscribed by Augusto Chaves Batista in Brotéria Sér. Ci. Nat. vol.30 (Series 3-4) on page 87 in 1961.

== Species ==
As accepted by Species Fungorum;

- Resendea cratevae Bat. (1961)
- Resendea paraguayensis Bat. (1961)
