= Cirsosina =

Scientific classification
- Kingdom: Fungi
- Division: Ascomycota
- Class: Dothideomycetes
- Order: Microthyriales
- Family: Microthyriaceae
- Genus: Cirsosina; Bat. & J.L. Bezerra

Type species
- Cirsosina rhododendri Bat. & J.L. Bezerra

Genus of fungi

Cirsosina is a genus of fungi in the Microthyriaceae family; according to the 2007 Outline of Ascomycota, the placement in this family is uncertain.

== Species ==
As accepted by Species Fungorum;

- Cirsosina calami Bat. (1960)
- Cirsosina rhododendri Bat. & J.L. Bezerra (1960)
