= Pachythyrium =

Scientific classification
- Kingdom: Fungi
- Division: Ascomycota
- Class: Dothideomycetes
- Order: Microthyriales
- Family: Microthyriaceae
- Genus: Pachythyrium; G. Arnaud ex Spooner & P.M. Kirk

Type species
- Pachythyrium parasiticum (Fabre) G. Arnaud ex Spooner & P.M. Kirk

Genus of fungi

Pachythyrium is a genus of fungi in the Microthyriaceae family. This is a monotypic genus, containing the single species Pachythyrium parasiticum.
