= Helminthopeltis =

Scientific classification
- Kingdom: Fungi
- Division: Ascomycota
- Class: Dothideomycetes
- Order: Microthyriales
- Family: Microthyriaceae
- Genus: Helminthopeltis; Sousa da Câmara

Type species
- Helminthopeltis almeidaeana Sousa da Câmara

Genus of fungi

Helminthopeltis is a genus of fungi in the Microthyriaceae family; according to the 2007 Outline of Ascomycota, the placement in this family is uncertain. This is a monotypic genus, containing the single species Helminthopeltis almeidaeana.
