= Pseudoparodia =

Scientific classification
- Kingdom: Fungi
- Division: Ascomycota
- Class: Dothideomycetes
- Order: Pleosporales
- Family: Venturiaceae
- Genus: Pseudoparodia; Theiss. & Syd. (1917)

Type species
- Pseudoparodia pseudopeziza (Pat.) Theiss. & Syd. (1947)

Genus of fungi

Pseudoparodia is a genus of fungi in the family Venturiaceae. This is a monotypic genus, containing the single species Pseudoparodia pseudopeziza.

The genus was first described in 1917 by Ferdinand Theissen and Hans Sydow, with the type species, Pseudoparodia pseudopeziza being nominated by the same authors in 1947.
