= Dictyoasterina =

Scientific classification
- Kingdom: Fungi
- Division: Ascomycota
- Class: Dothideomycetes
- Order: Microthyriales
- Family: Microthyriaceae
- Genus: Dictyoasterina; Hansf.

Type species
- Dictyoasterina conopharyngiae Hansf.

Genus of fungi

Dictyoasterina is a genus of fungi in the Microthyriaceae family. This is a monotypic genus, containing the single species Dictyoasterina conopharyngiae.
