= Asterinema =

Scientific classification
- Kingdom: Fungi
- Division: Ascomycota
- Class: Dothideomycetes
- Order: Microthyriales
- Family: Microthyriaceae
- Genus: Asterinema; Bat. & Gayão

Type species
- Asterinema caseariae Bat. & Gayão

Genus of fungi

Asterinema is a genus of fungi in the Microthyriaceae family.

Species; as accepted by Species Fungorum;

- Asterinema caseariae Bat. & Gayão (1953)
- Asterinema philippinense Bat. & M.L. Farr (1958)

Former species;

- A. caseariae var. amazonense M.L. Farr (1983) = Asterinema caseariae
- A. jahnii (Syd.) Bat., Maia & M.L. Farr (1958) = Calothyrium jahnii, Microthyriaceae
