= Asteritea =

Scientific classification
- Kingdom: Fungi
- Division: Ascomycota
- Class: Dothideomycetes
- Order: Microthyriales
- Family: Microthyriaceae
- Genus: Asteritea; Bat. & R. Garnier

Type species
- Asteritea roureae Bat. & R. Garnier

Genus of fungi

Asteritea is a genus of fungi in the Microthyriaceae family; according to the 2007 Outline of Ascomycota, the placement in this family is uncertain. This is a monotypic genus, containing the single species Asteritea roureae. Asteritea is a parasitic or saprobic fungus that appears as black spots on the underside of leaves. Wu, Hyde, and Chen describe Asteritea as having "flattened ascomata with a star-like opening and superficial mycelium with hyphopodia" and suggest placement in the Asterinaceae family.
