= Xenostomella =

Scientific classification
- Kingdom: Fungi
- Division: Ascomycota
- Class: Dothideomycetes
- Order: Microthyriales
- Family: Microthyriaceae
- Genus: Xenostomella; Syd.

Type species
- Xenostomella tovarensis Syd.

Genus of fungi

Xenostomella is a genus of fungi in the Microthyriaceae family.

== Species ==
As accepted by Species Fungorum;

- Xenostomella meridensis Toro (1934)
- Xenostomella monninae (Syd.) Arx (1962)
- Xenostomella tovarensis Syd. (1930)
