= Mycotodea =

Scientific classification
- Kingdom: Fungi
- Division: Ascomycota
- Class: Dothideomycetes
- Order: Pleosporales
- Family: Leptosphaeriaceae
- Genus: Mycotodea; Kirschst. (1936)

Type species
- Mycotodea heufleri (Niessl) Kirschst. (1936)

Genus of fungi

Mycotodea is a genus of fungi in the Ascomycota division. It was later placed in the Leptosphaeriaceae family. The widespread genus contained 14 species, before most were transferred to Leptosphaerulina and Leptopeltis genera. It was left as a monotypic genus, with just Mycotodea litorea Kirschst. (1939).

The genus was circumscribed by Wilhelm Kirschstein in Ann. Mycol. vol.34 on page 201 in 1936.

The genus name of Mycotodea is in honour of Heinrich Julius Tode (1733–1797), who was a German Theologian and pedagogue and was also interested in Poetry, Architecture and botany (Mycology). He was a tutor and Pastor in different locations.

== Former species ==
As listed by Species Fungorum;

- M. aquilina (Fr.) Kirschst. (1938) = Leptopeltis aquilina, Leptopeltidaceae
- M. helvetica (Sacc. & Speg.) Kirschst. (1938) = Leptosphaeria helvetica, Leptosphaeriaceae
- M. heufleri (Niessl) Kirschst. (1936) = Leptosphaeria heufleri, Leptosphaeriaceae
- M. hyperborea (Fuckel) Kirschst. (1936) = Leptosphaerulina hyperborea, Didymellaceae
- M. juncina (Auersw.) Kirschst. (1939) = Phaeosphaeria juncina, Phaeosphaeriaceae
- M. lemaneae (Cohn ex Woronin) Kirschst. (1938) = Phaeospora lemaneae, Dothideomycetes
- M. personata (Niessl) Kirschst. (1938) = Leptosphaerulina personata, Didymellaceae
- M. petkovicensis (Bubák & Ranoj.) Kirschst. (1939) = Phaeosphaeria petkovicensis, Phaeosphaeriaceae
- M. pulchra (G. Winter) Kirschst. (1936) = Leptosphaerulina pulchra, Didymellaceae
- M. striolata (Pass.) Kirschst. (1938) = Leptosphaeria striolata, Leptosphaeriaceae
