= Cirsosiopsis =

Scientific classification
- Kingdom: Fungi
- Division: Ascomycota
- Class: Dothideomycetes
- Order: Microthyriales
- Family: Microthyriaceae
- Genus: Cirsosiopsis; Butin & Speer

Type species
- Cirsosiopsis violacescens Butin & Speer

Genus of fungi

Cirsosiopsis is a monotypic, genus of fungi in the Microthyriaceae family. It only has one known species, Cirsosiopsis violacescens Butin & Speer (1979).
