= Lembosiella =

Scientific classification
- Kingdom: Fungi
- Division: Ascomycota
- Class: Dothideomycetes
- Order: Microthyriales
- Family: Microthyriaceae
- Genus: Lembosiella; Sacc.

Type species
- Lembosiella polyspora (Pat.) Sacc.

Genus of fungi

Lembosiella is a genus of fungi in the Microthyriaceae family; according to the 2007 Outline of Ascomycota, the placement in this family is uncertain. This is a monotypic genus, containing the single species Lembosiella polyspora.
