= Byssopeltis =

Scientific classification
- Kingdom: Fungi
- Division: Ascomycota
- Class: Dothideomycetes
- Order: Microthyriales
- Family: Microthyriaceae
- Genus: Byssopeltis; Bat., J.L. Bezerra & T. Barros

Type species
- Byssopeltis maranhensis Bat., J.L. Bezerra & T.T. Barros

Genus of fungi

Byssopeltis is a genus of fungi in the Microthyriaceae family. This is a monotypic genus, containing the single species Byssopeltis maranhensis .
