= A. lagunensis =

A. lagunensis may refer to:

- Aglaia lagunensis, a Philippine tree
- Asperoseius lagunensis, a mite in the family Phytoseiidae
- Astronia lagunensis, a flowering plant
- Aureoumbra lagunensis, a marine picoplankton
