= Petrakiopeltis =

Scientific classification
- Kingdom: Fungi
- Division: Ascomycota
- Class: Dothideomycetes
- Order: Microthyriales
- Family: Microthyriaceae
- Genus: Petrakiopeltis; Bat., A.F. Vital & Cif.

Type species
- Petrakiopeltis byrsonimae Bat., A.F. Vital & Cif.

Genus of fungi

Petrakiopeltis is a genus of fungi in the Microthyriaceae family; according to the 2007 Outline of Ascomycota, the placement in this family is uncertain. This is a monotypic genus, containing the single species Petrakiopeltis byrsonimae.

The genus name of Petrakiopeltis is in honour of Franz Petrak (1886–1973), who was an Austrian-Czech mycologist.

The genus was circumscribed by Augusto Chaves Batista, A. Fernandes Vital and Raffaele Ciferri in Ist. Bot. Univ. Lab. Crittog. Pavia Atti series 5, vol.15 on pages 42-44 in 1958.
