= Salvia cavaleriei =

Scientific classification
- Kingdom: Plantae
- Clade: Embryophytes
- Clade: Tracheophytes
- Clade: Spermatophytes
- Clade: Angiosperms
- Clade: Eudicots
- Clade: Asterids
- Order: Lamiales
- Family: Lamiaceae
- Genus: Salvia
- Species: S. cavaleriei

Binomial name
- Salvia cavaleriei Lév.

Varieties
- S. cavaleriei var. cavaleriei; S. cavaleriei var. erythrophylla (Hemsley) E. Peter; S. cavaleriei var. simplicifolia E. Peter

Species of herb

Salvia cavaleriei (Qian sage) is an herb that is native to Guangdong, Guangxi, Guizhou, Hubei, Hunan, Jiangxi, Shaanxi, Sichuan, and Yunnan provinces in China, growing in forests, on hillsides, and streamsides at 500 to 2,700 m (1,600 to 8,900 ft) elevation. S. cavaleriei is a short, robust plant reaching 12 to 32 cm (4.7 to 12.6 in) tall. Inflorescences are widely spaced 2–6 flowered verticillasters in terminal racemes or panicles, with a blue-purple to purple-red or white corolla that is approximately 0.8 cm (0.31 in).

There are three named varieties. In addition to variation in leaf shape and size, they have the following flower colors:

- S. cavaleriei var. cavaleriei is blue-purple or purple.
- S. cavaleriei var. erythrophylla is dark purple or white.
- S. cavaleriei var. simplicifolia is purple or purple-red.
