= Trichothyriella =

Scientific classification
- Kingdom: Fungi
- Division: Ascomycota
- Class: Dothideomycetes
- Order: Microthyriales
- Family: Microthyriaceae
- Genus: Trichothyriella; Theiss.

Type species
- Trichothyriella quercigena (Berk.) Theiss.

Genus of fungi

Trichothyriella is a genus of fungi in the Microthyriaceae family. This is a monotypic genus, containing the single species Trichothyriella quercigena.
