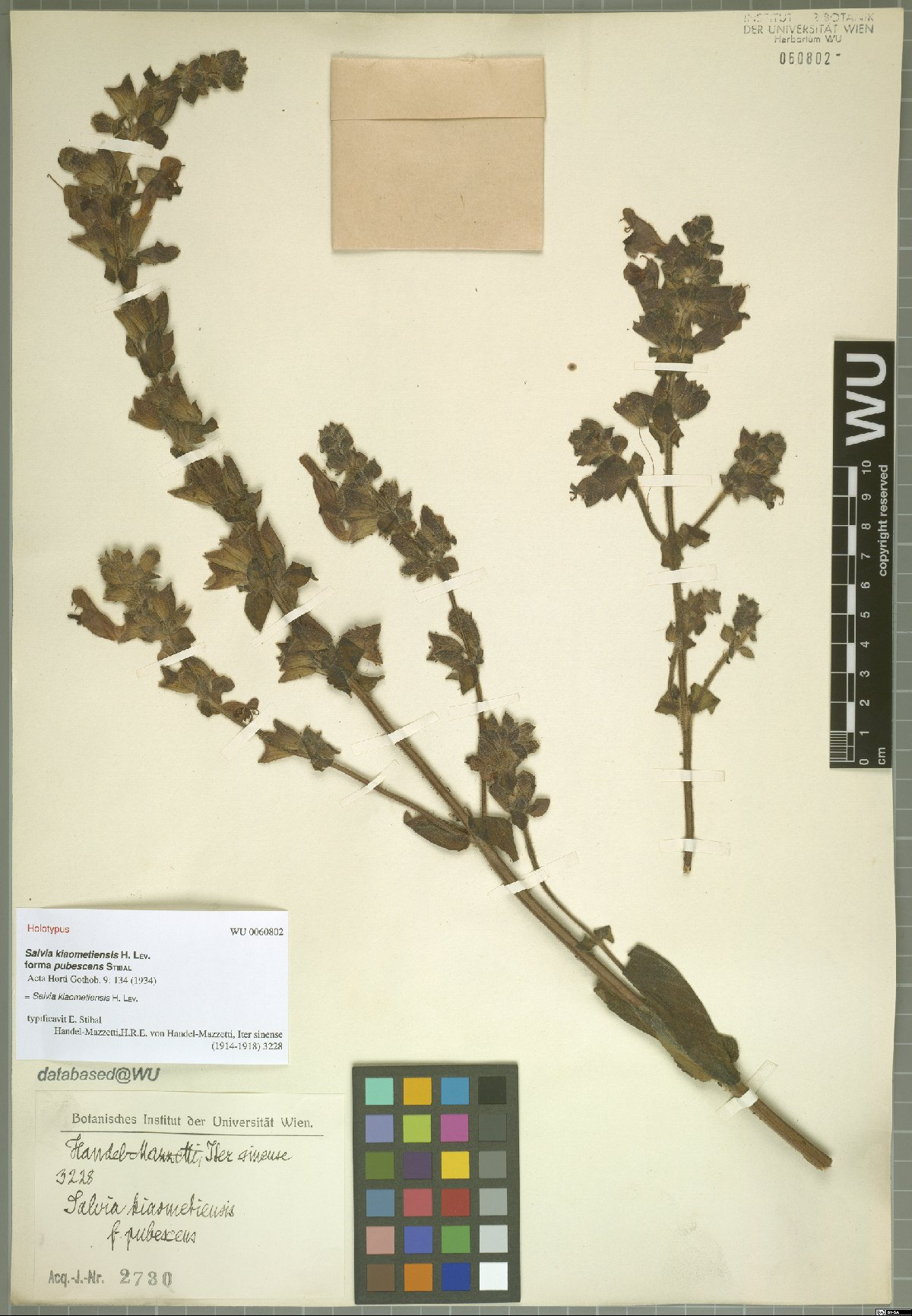

Scientific classification
- Kingdom: Plantae
- Clade: Tracheophytes
- Clade: Angiosperms
- Clade: Eudicots
- Clade: Asterids
- Order: Lamiales
- Family: Lamiaceae
- Genus: Salvia
- Species: S. kiaometiensis

Binomial name
- Salvia kiaometiensis Lév.

= Salvia kiaometiensis =

Species of flowering plant

Salvia kiaometiensis (upland danshen) is a perennial plant that is native to Sichuan and Yunnan provinces in China, found growing on hillside grasslands at 2,300 to 3,200 m (7,500 to 10,500 ft) elevation. S. kiaometiensis grows 25 to 50 cm (9.8 to 19.7 in) tall, with ovate leaves that are 4 to 15 cm (1.6 to 5.9 in) long and 2 to 10 cm (0.79 to 3.94 in).

Inflorescences are compact 2–4 flowered verticillasters in terminal racemes. The corolla is purple-brown or red and 2.8 to 3.5 cm (1.1 to 1.4 in).
