= Caribaeomyces =

Scientific classification
- Kingdom: Fungi
- Division: Ascomycota
- Class: Dothideomycetes
- Order: Microthyriales
- Family: Microthyriaceae
- Genus: Caribaeomyces; Cif.

Type species
- Caribaeomyces tetrasporus (Toro) Cif.

Genus of fungi

Caribaeomyces is a genus of fungi in the Microthyriaceae family. This is a monotypic genus, containing the single species Caribaeomyces tetrasporus.
