= Trichothyriopsis =

Scientific classification
- Kingdom: Fungi
- Division: Ascomycota
- Class: Dothideomycetes
- Order: Microthyriales
- Family: Trichothyriaceae
- Genus: Trichothyriopsis; Theiss.

Type species
- Trichothyriopsis densa (Racib.) Theiss.

Genus of fungi

Trichothyriopsis is a genus of fungi in the family Trichothyriaceae.

== Species ==
As accepted by Species Fungorum;

- Trichothyriopsis alineum Bat. (1951)
- Trichothyriopsis juruana Theiss. (1919)

Former species;

- Trichothyriopsis densa (Racib.) Theiss. (1914) = Trichothyrium densa, Trichothyriaceae
- Trichothyriopsis sexspora (Starbäck) Theiss. (1919) = Trichothyrium sexsporum, Trichothyriaceae
