= Seynesiopeltis =

Scientific classification
- Kingdom: Fungi
- Division: Ascomycota
- Class: Dothideomycetes
- Order: Microthyriales
- Family: Microthyriaceae
- Genus: Seynesiopeltis; F. Stevens & R.W. Ryan

Type species
- Seynesiopeltis tetraplasandrae F. Stevens & R.W. Ryan

Genus of fungi

Seynesiopeltis is a genus of fungi in the Microthyriaceae family. This is a monotypic genus, containing the single species Seynesiopeltis tetraplasandrae F. Stevens & R.W. Ryan (1925).

The genus was circumscribed by Frank Lincoln Stevens and Ruth Winifred Ryan in Bernice P. Bishop Mus. Bull. vol.19 on page 69 in 1925.

The genus name of Seynesiopeltis is in honour of Jules de Seynes (1833–1912), who was a French physician, botanist and mycologist, and Professor of Natural history at the Medical faculty within the University of Paris. He previously also was at the University of Montpellier.
