= Asperoseius =

Scientific classification
- Kingdom: Animalia
- Phylum: Arthropoda
- Subphylum: Chelicerata
- Class: Arachnida
- Order: Mesostigmata
- Family: Phytoseiidae
- Genus: Asperoseius; Chant, 1957

Genus of mites

Asperoseius is a genus of mites in the Phytoseiidae family.

== Species ==
- Asperoseius africanus Chant, 1957
- Asperoseius australiensis Fain & Krantz, 1990
- Asperoseius baguioensis Corpuz-Raros, 1994
- Asperoseius henryae Fain & Krantz, 1990
- Asperoseius lagunensis Corpuz-Raros, 1994
