= Stegothyrium =

Scientific classification
- Kingdom: Fungi
- Division: Ascomycota
- Class: Dothideomycetes
- Order: Microthyriales
- Family: Microthyriaceae
- Genus: Stegothyrium; Höhn.

Type species
- Stegothyrium denudans (Rehm) Höhn., Sber. Akad. Wiss. Wien, Math.-naturw. Kl., Abt. 1 127(4-5): 382 (1918)

Synonyms
- Muyocopron denudans Rehm, Hedwigia 42 (Beibl.): (292) (1903)

Genus of fungi

Stegothyrium is a genus of fungi in the Microthyriaceae family; according to the 2007 Outline of Ascomycota, the placement in this family is uncertain. This is a monotypic genus, containing the single species Stegothyrium denudans (Rehm) Höhn..
