= Trichothyriomyces =

Scientific classification
- Kingdom: Fungi
- Division: Ascomycota
- Class: Dothideomycetes
- Order: Microthyriales
- Family: Microthyriaceae
- Genus: Trichothyriomyces; Bat. & H. Maia

Type species
- Trichothyriomyces notatus Bat. & H. Maia

Genus of fungi

Trichothyriomyces is a genus of fungi in the Microthyriaceae family. This is a monotypic genus, containing the single species Trichothyriomyces notatus.
