= Actinomyxa =

Scientific classification
- Kingdom: Fungi
- Division: Ascomycota
- Class: Dothideomycetes
- Order: Microthyriales
- Family: Microthyriaceae
- Genus: Actinomyxa; Syd. & P. Syd.

Type species
- Actinomyxa australiensis Syd. & P. Syd.

Genus of fungi

Actinomyxa is a genus of fungi in the Microthyriaceae family. This is a monotypic genus, containing the single species Actinomyxa australiensis.
