= André Maublanc =

French mycologist and plant pathologist

André Pierre Jules Maublanc (24 July 1880, in Nantes – 30 April 1958, in Paris) was a French mycologist and plant pathologist.

Beginning in 1902, he worked as a préparateur at the Station de Pathologie végétale in Paris. In 1912, he traveled to Brazil, where he was responsible for organizing the plant pathology laboratory at the National Museum in Rio de Janeiro. In 1921, he was named head (chef de travaux) of botany and plant pathology at the Institut nationale agronomique.

From 1909 he served as general secretary of the Société mycologique de France, and in 1945 was named president of the Société botanique de France. The mycological genera Maublancia (G.Arnaud, 1918) and Maublancomyces (Herter, 1950) commemorate his name.

== Selected works ==
- Maladies des plantes cultivées; with Georges Delacroix (2 volumes, 1908–09) – Diseases of cultivated plants.
  - I, Maladies non parasitaires (non-parasitic diseases), by Delacroix.
  - II, Maladies parasitaires (parasitic diseases), by Delacroix and Maublanc.
- Les champignons comestibles et vénéneux, (1921, 6th edition 1971) – Edible and poisonous mushrooms.
- Icones selectae fungorum; with Paul Konrad (6 parts, 1924–37).
- Les Agaricales classification, revision des especes, iconographie, comestibilite; with Paul Konrad (1948) – Classification of Agaricales; revision of species, iconography and edibility.
