= Schizothyriaceae =

Scientific classification
- Kingdom: Fungi
- Division: Ascomycota
- Class: Dothideomycetes
- Order: Microthyriales
- Family: Schizothyriaceae; Höhn. ex Trotter (1928)

Type genus
- Schizothyrium Desm. (1849)

Family of fungi

The Schizothyriaceae are a family of fungi of uncertain ordinal placement in the class Dothideomycetes. It comprises 10 genera and around 70 species.

== Genera ==
- Amazonotheca Bat. & H.Maia (1959) – 2 spp.
- Hexagonella F.Stevens & Guba ex F.Stevens (1925) – 1 sp.
- Kerniomyces Toro (1939) – 1 sp.
- Lecideopsella Höhn. (1909) – 10 spp.
- Metathyriella Syd. (1927) – 3 spp.
- Mycerema Bat., J.L.Bezerra & Cavalc. (1963) – 1 sp.
- Myriangiella Zimm. (1902) – 5 spp.
- Plochmopeltis Theiss. (1914) – 5 spp.
- Schizothyrium Desm. (1849) – 40 spp.
- Spegazziniella Bat. & I.H.Lima (1959) – 14 spp.
- Sydowiellina Bat. & I.H.Lima 1959 - 15 spp.
- Vonarxella Bat., J.L.Bezerra & Peres (1965) – 1 sp.
