= Leveillella =

Scientific classification
- Kingdom: Fungi
- Division: Ascomycota
- Class: Dothideomycetes
- Order: Asterinales
- Family: Asterinaceae
- Genus: Leveillella; Theiss. & Syd.

Type species
- Leveillella drimydis

Genus of fungi

Leveillella is a genus of fungi in the Asterinaceae family. This is a monotypic genus, containing the single species Leveillella drimydis (Lév.) Theiss. & Syd.

The genus name of Leveillella is in honour of Joseph-Henri Léveillé (1796–1870), who was a French physician and mycologist.

The genus was circumscribed by Ferdinand Theissen and Hans Sydow in Ann. Mycol. Vol.13 on page 284 in 1915.
