= Asperoseius lagunensis =

Scientific classification
- Domain: Eukaryota
- Kingdom: Animalia
- Phylum: Arthropoda
- Subphylum: Chelicerata
- Class: Arachnida
- Order: Mesostigmata
- Family: Phytoseiidae
- Genus: Asperoseius
- Species: A. lagunensis

Binomial name
- Asperoseius lagunensis Corpuz-Raros, 1994

Species of mite

Asperoseius lagunensis is a species of mite in the family Phytoseiidae.
