= Asperoseius australiensis =

Scientific classification
- Domain: Eukaryota
- Kingdom: Animalia
- Phylum: Arthropoda
- Subphylum: Chelicerata
- Class: Arachnida
- Order: Mesostigmata
- Family: Phytoseiidae
- Genus: Asperoseius
- Species: A. australiensis

Binomial name
- Asperoseius australiensis Fain & Krantz, 1990

Species of mite

Asperoseius australiensis is a species of mite in the family Phytoseiidae.
