= Édouard Ernest Prillieux =

French botanist and agronomist

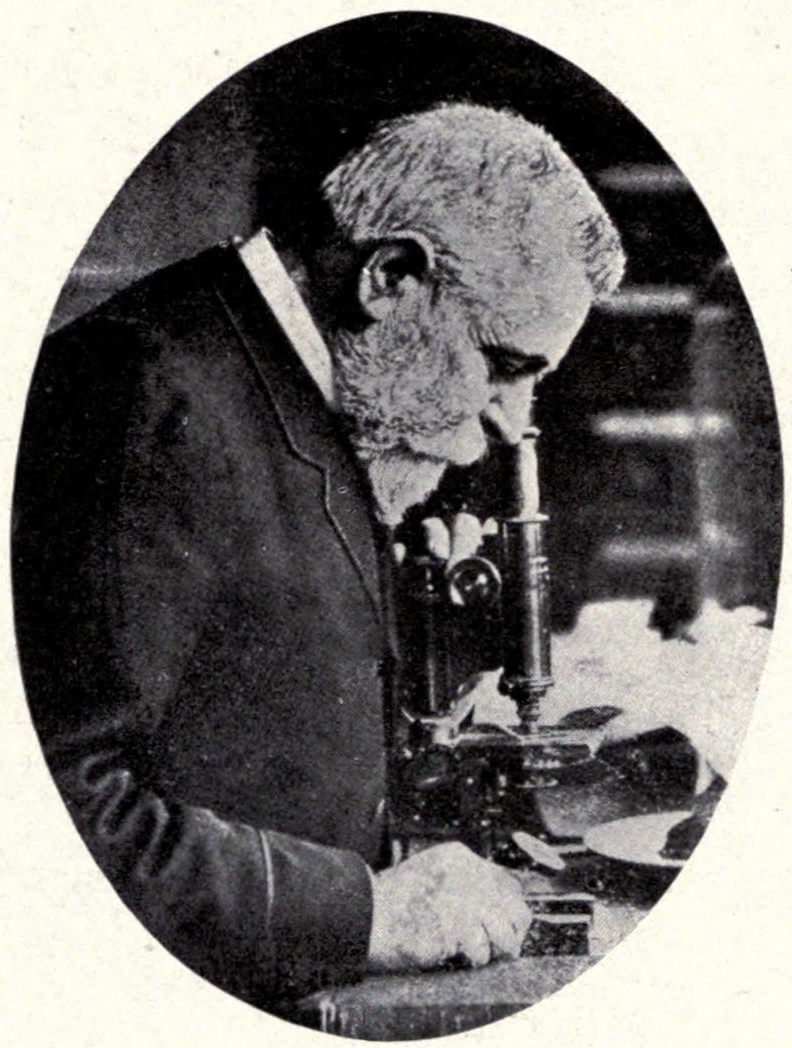

Édouard Ernest Prillieux (11 January 1829 in Paris – 7 October 1915 in Mondoubleau) was a French botanist and agronomist known for his work with plant diseases.

He took courses at the Muséum National d'Histoire Naturelle as a pupil of Adrien-Henri de Jussieu and Adolphe-Théodore Brongniart, then from 1850 studied botany at the Institut national agronomique in Versailles under Pierre Étienne Simon Duchartre. For a number of years afterwards he served in various functions at the Sorbonne and at the natural history museum. From 1874 he taught classes at the École Centrale des Arts et Manufactures, and in 1876 was named a professor of botany and plant physiology at the agronomic institute. In 1887 he became director of the Station de Pathologie végétale in Paris.

In 1876 he was chosen as president of the Société nationale d'agriculture, and in 1883 became inspector general of agricultural education. In 1897 he replaced Charles Victor Naudin at the French Academy of Sciences (botanical section). From 1897 to 1906 he served as a senator representing the department of Loir-et-Cher.

The mycological genera Prillieuxia (Sacc. & Syd., 1899) and Prillieuxina (G.Arnaud, 1918) commemorate his name.

== Selected works ==
- De la Structure et du mode de formation des graines bulbiformes de quelques amaryllidées (1858) – The structure and mode of formation of bulbous seeds in some members of Amaryllidaceae.
- Etude du mode de végétation des orchidées (1867) – Research on the mode of vegetation involving orchids.
- Le pourridié des vignes de la Haute-Marne produit par le "Rœsleria hypogæa" (1880) – Vine rot in Haute-Marne caused by Roesleria hypogaea.
- Maladies des plantes agricoles et des arbres fruitiers et forestiers causées par des parasites végétaux (2 volumes, 1895–97) – Diseases of agricultural plants, fruit and forest trees caused by plant pests.
- Les Maladies des noyers en France; with Georges Delacroix (1898) – Diseases of walnut trees in France.
- Rapport sur une maladie des pruniers dans l'arrondissement de Villeneuve-sur-Lot; with Georges Delacroix (1900) – Report on a disease of plum trees in the arrondissement of Villeneuve-sur-Lot.
