= Georges Delacroix =

Botanist (1858-1907)

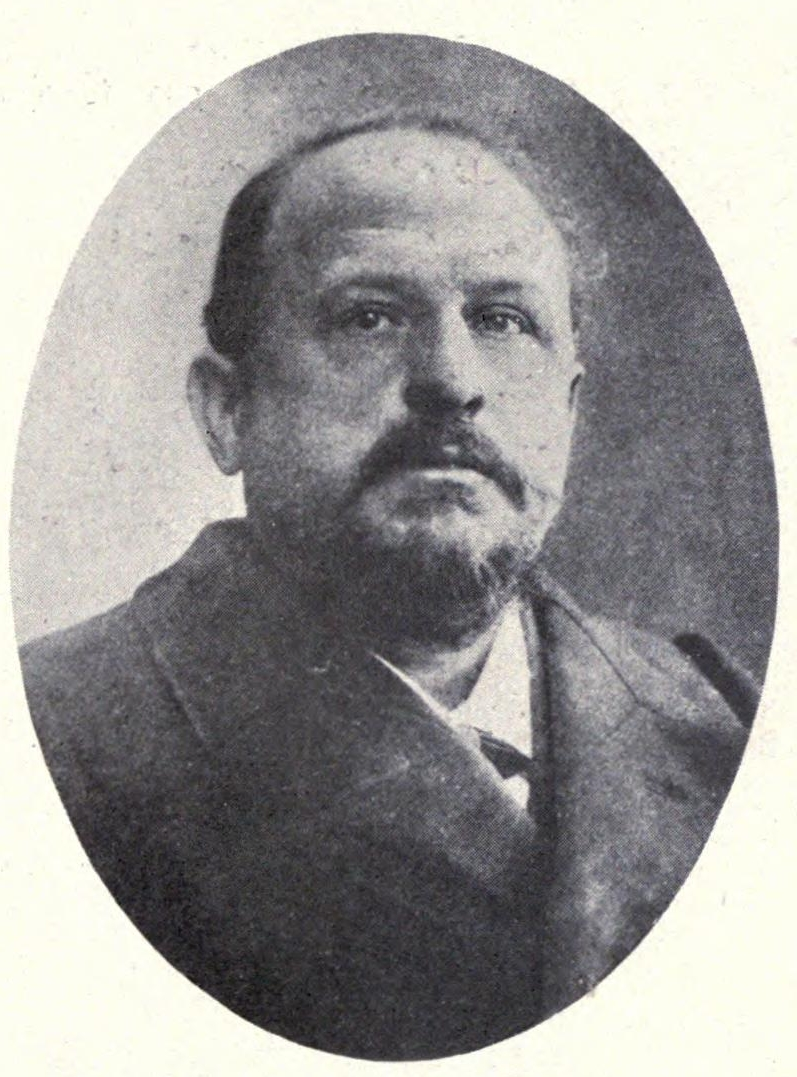

Édouard Georges Delacroix (24 January 1858 in Montrouge – 1 November 1907 in Paris) was a French mycologist and plant pathologist.

Beginning in 1886 he worked in the laboratory of plant pathology at the Institut nationale agronomique, where he later served as a lecturer of descriptive botany (from 1895) and plant pathology (from 1898). In 1899 he was named director of the Station de Pathologie végétale in Paris.

His name is associated with the mycological species Aspergillus delacroixii (synonym, Aspergillus nidulans var. echinulatus).

== Selected works ==
- Espèces nouvelles observées au Laboratoire de Pathologie végétale (1893) – New species observed at the laboratory of plant pathology.
- Les maladies des noyers en France; with Édouard Ernest Prillieux (1898) – Diseases of walnut trees in France.
- Atlas de botanique descriptive comprenant l'étude des familles les plus importantes au point de vue économique (cryptogames et phanérogames) (1898) – Atlas of descriptive botany.
- Les maladies et les ennemis des caféiers (1900) – Diseases and pests of coffee.
- Maladies des plantes cultivées; with André Maublanc (2 volumes, 1908–09) – Diseases of cultivated plants.
  - I, Maladies non parasitaires (non-parasitic diseases), by Delacroix.
  - II, Maladies parasitaires (parasitic diseases), by Delacroix and Maublanc.

== See also ==
- Mycology
- Institut national agronomique Paris Grignon
