= Leptopeltidaceae =

Scientific classification
- Kingdom: Fungi
- Division: Ascomycota
- Class: Dothideomycetes
- Order: Microthyriales
- Family: Leptopeltidaceae; Höhn. ex Trotter

Type genus
- Leptopeltis Höhn.

Family of fungi

The Leptopeltidaceae are a family of fungi in the class Dothideomycetes.

== Genera ==
As accepted by GBIF;

- Dothiopeltis E.Müll., 1957 (2)
- Leptopeltis Höhn. (9)
- Moesziella (1)
- Nannfeldtia Petr. (2)
- Opegraphellomyces (1)
- Phacidina Höhn. (1)
- Ronnigeria Petr. (1)
- Staibia Bat. & Peres (1)

Figures in brackets are approx. how many species per genus.
