= Joseph-Henri Léveillé =

French physician and mycologist (1796–1870)

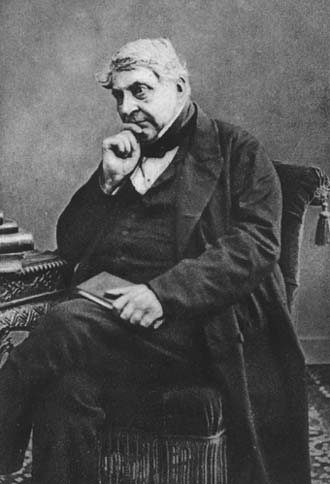

Joseph-Henri Léveillé (28 May 1796 – 3 February 1870) was a French medical doctor and mycologist who was a native of Crux-la-Ville, in the department of Nièvre.

Léveillé studied medicine and mycology at the University of Paris, and in 1824 received his medical doctorate.

In his 1837 paper Sur le hymenium des champignons, he provided an early, comprehensive description of the basidium and cystidium of basidiomycete fungi, and was able to establish the role that the basidium played in spore production. Also, he made important findings in regard to the true nature of individual members of the so-called genus "Sclerotium".

== Selected writings ==
- Sur le hymenium des champignons (1837)
- Memoire sur le genre Sclerotium (1843)
- Considérations mycologiques, suivies d'une nouvelle classification des champignons (1846)
- Iconographie des Champignons de Paulet (1855)

== Honours ==
He is honoured in the naming of Leveillella in 1915, which is a genus of fungi in the Asterinaceae family.

== See also ==
- Category:Taxa named by Joseph-Henri Léveillé
