= Gabriel Arnaud =

Mycologist

Gabriel Arnaud (1882–1957) was a mycologist.

== Works ==
- Contribution à l'étude des fumagines. G Arnaud, 1910
- Les astérinées. G Arnaud, 1918
- Etude sur les champignons parasites (Parodiellinacees, inclus Erysiphees). G Arnaud, 1921
