= Micropeltidaceae =

Scientific classification
- Kingdom: Fungi
- Division: Ascomycota
- Class: Dothideomycetes
- Subclass: Dothideomycetidae
- Family: Micropeltidaceae; Clem. & Shear, 1931

Type genus
- Micropeltis Mont., 1842

Family of fungi

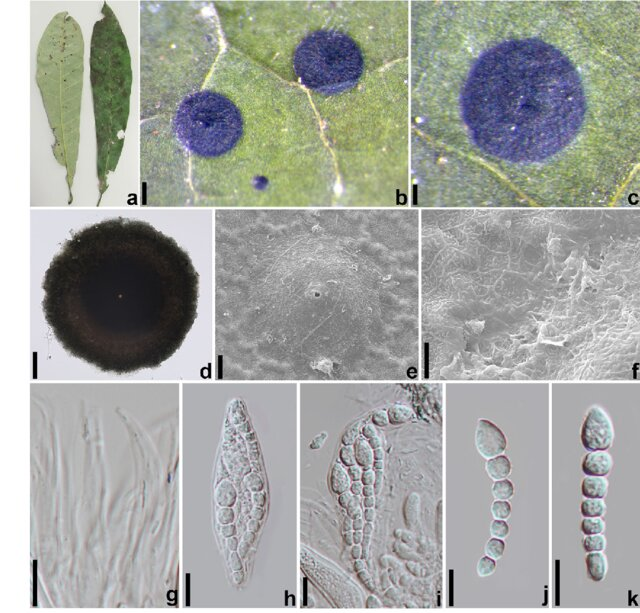
Micropeltis asiatica.

The Micropeltidaceae are a family of fungi with an uncertain taxonomic placement in the class Dothideomycetes.
