= Microthyriaceae =

Scientific classification
- Kingdom: Fungi
- Division: Ascomycota
- Class: Dothideomycetes
- Order: Microthyriales
- Family: Microthyriaceae; Sacc.

Type genus
- Microthyrium Desm.

Family of fungi

The Microthyriaceae are a family of fungi with an uncertain taxonomic placement in the class Dothideomycetes.

== List of genera ==
The following genera are included within the Microthyriaceae, according to the 2007 Outline of Ascomycota there were 49 genera. The placement of genera with a question mark preceding their name is uncertain.

Actinomyxa — Arnaudiella — Asterinella — Asterinema — Asteritea — Asteronia — Byssopeltis — Calothyriopsis — Caribaeomyces — Caudella — Cirsosina — Cirsosiopsis — Cyclotheca — Dictyoasterina — Govindua — Helminthopeltis — Hidakaea — Hugueninia — Lembosiella — Lichenopeltella — Maublancia — Microthyrium — Pachythyrium — Palawania — Petrakiopeltis — Phaeothyriolum — Phragmaspidium — Platypeltella — Polycyclinopsis — Polystomellina — Resendea — Sapucchaka — Scolecopeltidium — Seynesiella — Seynesiola - Seynesiopeltis — Stegothyrium — Tothia — Trichopeltella — Trichopeltospora — Trichopeltum — Trichothyriella — Trichothyrinula — Trichothyriomyces — Xenostomella
