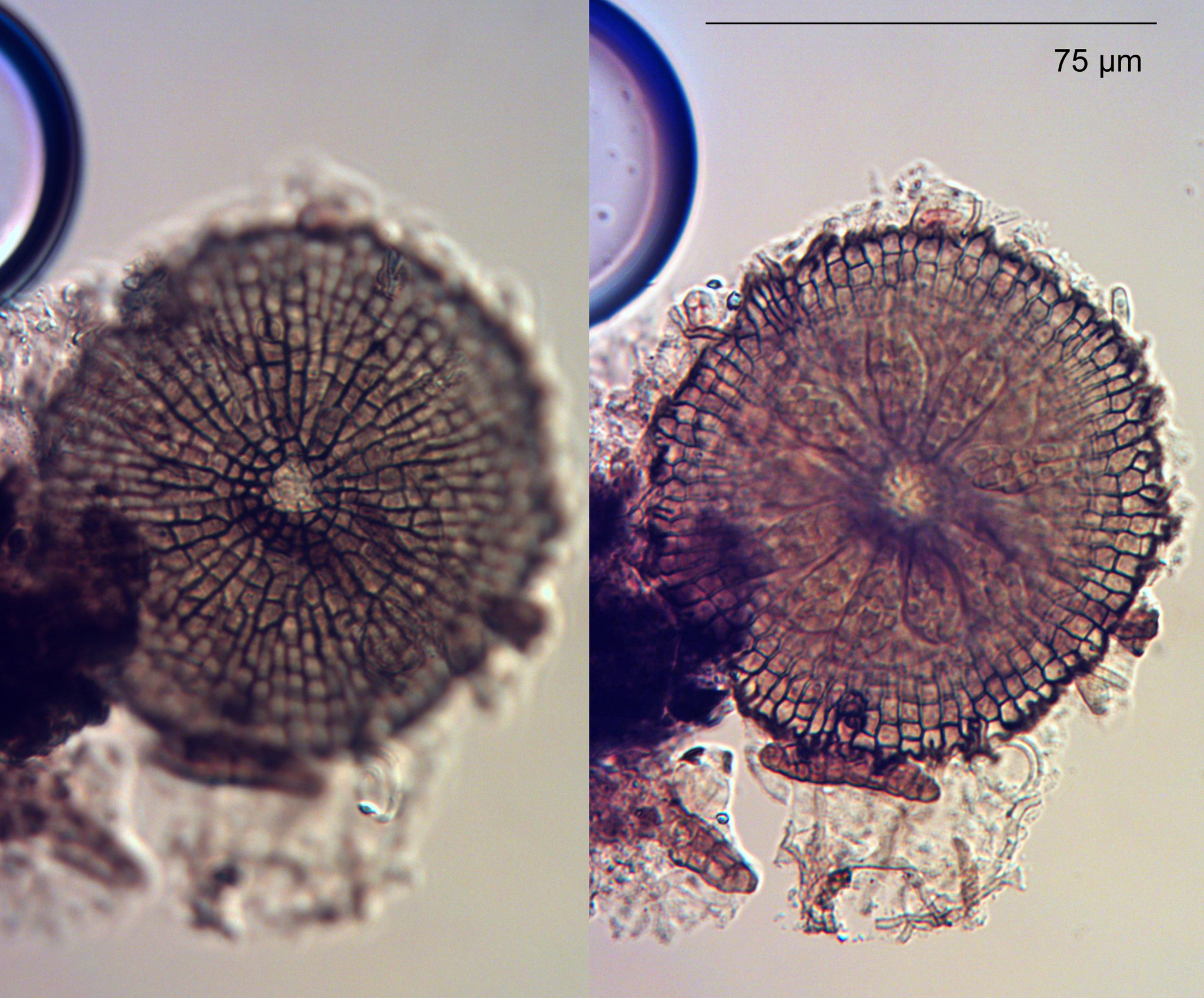
- image of Microthyrium gramineum

Scientific classification
- Kingdom: Fungi
- Division: Ascomycota
- Class: Dothideomycetes
- Order: Microthyriales; G.Arnaud (1925)

Families
- Aulographaceae; Dubujianaceae; Leptopeltidaceae; Micropeltidaceae; Microthyriaceae; Schizothyriaceae; Trichothyriaceae

= Microthyriales =

Order of fungi

The Microthyriales are an order of sac fungi. According to a 2008 estimate, the order contains 3 families, 62 genera and 323 species. Species in the Microthyriales have small, flattened fruit bodies with one of more central slits, and are saprobic or epiphytic on the leaves and stems of plants.
